= List of Moribito: Guardian of the Spirit episodes =

The cover of the first DVD compilation released by Geneon Entertainment.

Moribito: Guardian of the Spirit is a Japanese anime television series based on the Moribito series of Japanese fantasy novels written by Nahoko Uehashi. The anime, directed by Kenji Kamiyama and produced by Production I.G., adapts the first installment over twenty-six episodes. It aired from April 7, 2007, to September 29, 2007, on NHK-BS2.

Two pieces of theme music are used for the episodes; one opening theme and one closing theme. The opening theme is "Shine" by Japanese rock band L'Arc-en-Ciel, and the closing theme is Sachi Tainaka's "Itoshii Hito e" (愛しい人へ; lit. To the loved one).

Thirteen DVD compilations, each containing two episodes of the series, have been released in Japan by Geneon Entertainment, with the last released on June 28, 2008. The English adaptation of the series was produced by Geneon Entertainment.

== Episodes ==
No.	Title	Original release date	English air date
1	"Balsa, the Female Bodyguard"; Transliteration: "Barusa Onna Yōjinbō" (Japanese: バルサ女用心棒)	April 7, 2007	August 24, 2008
Balsa, a female spear wielder from Kanbal, has returned to the Shin Yogo Empire after two years to have her spear repaired. When Chagum, the second prince of Yogo, falls into a river, Balsa saves him and is then invited to the palace by the Second Empress to be rewarded. However, Balsa soon learns that the Second Empress's true intent is to hire Balsa as Chagum's bodyguard because the Emperor believes that Chagum has been possessed by an evil water spirit and must be killed. Balsa reluctantly agrees to protect the boy from imperial assassins and escapes with him, having the attendants set fire to Chagum's bedchamber as a distraction.
2	"Hunters, Hunted"; Transliteration: "Nigerumono Oumono" (Japanese: 逃げるもの 追うもの)	April 14, 2007	August 31, 2008
Balsa makes preparations to leave the capital with Chagum. She must leave the city without being noticed, a task made difficult by the prince being overcome with the grief of leaving his family. Shuga and Hibitonan, the pupil and master star diviners, discuss the events that recently happened, confirming that an evil water spirit has possessed Chagum. The Emperor dispatches four secret hunters to recover the prince and kill Balsa. Balsa takes Chagum to a hut to stay with Tōya and Saya, two orphaned children acquainted with Balsa, while they help gather supplies before Balsa and Chagum start their travels through the mountains.
3	"Fight to the Death"; Transliteration: "Shitō" (Japanese: 死闘)	April 21, 2007	September 7, 2008
Balsa discovers that she and Chagum are being followed by the secret hunters (Mon, Jin, Zen, and Yun), having no choice but to fight against these pursuers while Chagum runs away. However, in the confusion, she suffers severe injuries and the hunters capture Chagum. Meanwhile, Tōya and Saya stops by a restaurant in the evening to wait for Tanda, who stops by there twice a day to check up on any new medicine orders. Balsa manages to rescue Chagum, but due to her wounds, she gives him directions to where Tanda lives in the mountains. After successfully reaching Tanda, Chagum tells him about Balsa's current critical state.
4	"Torogai's Letter"; Transliteration: "Torogai no Fumi" (Japanese: トロガイの文)	April 28, 2007	September 14, 2008
The Emperor is told that the secret hunters failed to capture the prince and finish Balsa off. After Torogai, an elderly magic weaver, defeats Hyoku and Rai, two warriors also sent by the Emperor, she sends a letter to the star diviners, warning them of a drought that is predicted to befall the kingdom and offering her help to prevent this from happening. Hibitonan orders Shuga to go to the sacred chambers and decipher inscriptions of ancient stone scrolls of the magic weavers that may have connections to the water spirit. Tanda is able to retrieve and treat Balsa. Tōya and Saya arrive and inform Tanda about Chagum, and Balsa explains the situation she is in. She is then put to rest and later has her bandages replaced. As all five of them enjoy a meal together, Torogai drops by unannounced.
5	"Secret Plan, the Blue Hand"; Transliteration: "Hisaku, Aoi Te" (Japanese: 秘策、青い手)	May 5, 2007	September 21, 2008
Torogai reveals that Chagum is carrying the egg of the water spirit, chosen to be its guardian. Balsa knows that the Emperor will never openly search for the prince, so she comes up with a plan to throw the Emperor off her trail. However, when Chagum's staged funeral is held in the capital, a wide-area search for her is in the works. Tanda brings in a slave trader named the Blue Hand to Balsa, who wants to "purchase" and release all of his slaves using the Second Empress's treasure, in exchange for access to his hideout and one of his horses.
6	"To Die in the Misty Blue"; Transliteration: "Ao giri ni Shisu" (Japanese: 青霧に死す)	May 12, 2007	October 5, 2008
Balsa and Chagum, now with his hair cut off, set off and head toward the mountains. Unable to pinpoint the location of the bodyguard and the prince, all of the Emperor's hunters split into separate areas. The four hunters determine that Balsa and Chagum are heading north to the mountains, but Taga and Sune, respectively the seventh and eighth secret hunters, report that Balsa and Chagum may be travelling west instead. Mon and Zen manage to track Balsa and Chagun down in the mountains, and they attempt to corner the two at a cliff. All of a sudden, they witness Balsa and Chagum being dragged off the cliff by a large wolf, assuming the pair have died. However, Torogai was behind this course of action in order to fake their deaths.
7	"Chagum's Resolve"; Transliteration: "Chagumu no Ketsui" (Japanese: チャグムの決意)	May 19, 2007	October 12, 2008
In the city, Balsa proves to Chagum and Tanda that the whole town has been telling stories about her, some of which are false. While the three stop by at a shop for some medicinal herbs, Tanda comments on how Balsa treats Chagum as her child. Balsa buys a watermill at a village, so she can settle there with Chagum for the time being in order to remain hidden until next spring. To pass the time and make some money, they must use the watermill to grind grain for the local villagers. Balsa says to Chagum that money should be the least of his worries, since she will be the one providing for him.
8	"The Swordsmith"; Transliteration: "Katana Kaji" (Japanese: 刀鍛冶)	May 26, 2007	October 19, 2008
Balsa and Chagum visit a great swordsmith to get a new blade for Balsa's spear. The swordsmith agrees to forge her a new blade once he is convinced that she did not kill the prince. He locks them in a storage room before Mon and Jin enter the cabin to pick up their repaired swords, which happen to be in the same storage room. Before the swordsmith lets them retrieve their swords, he explains he would create a magnificent weapon for a warrior who uses it for justice and not malice. He tells the two of a story about a warrior who died while protecting a child from assassins, which alludes to Jiguro and Balsa. He grabs the swords from the storage room for them, and they give their thanks before leaving. After Balsa and Chagum come out in hiding, the swordsmith gives Balsa her new spear seven days later.
9	"Shuga Thirsts"; Transliteration: "Kawaki no Shuga" (Japanese: 渇きのシュガ)	June 2, 2007	October 26, 2008
After having noticed the drought sign has not diminished, Shuga soon finds out that Gakai, another master star diviner, is taking the stone scrolls from the sacred chambers to give to Sagum, the first prince of the empire. Shuga tries to prevent this, only to be demoted for his disobedience. He later meets with Sagum, who reveals that the stone scrolls are in his care now, much to Shuga's relief. Shuga travels to the village to investigate whether or not the water levels are lowering. He passes by Tanda, who is fascinated by Shuga's star reading tools and is curious to know why he has come to the village. Although the fish population and crop production seem normal, Shuga still suspects that a drought may occur.
10	"Soil and Heroes"; Transliteration: "Tsuchi to Eiyū" (Japanese: 土と英雄)	June 9, 2007	November 1, 2008
Balsa tells Tōya to teach Chagum how to act more like a city dweller. Tōya shows him how to negotiate with a concession stand seller by lowering the price of the food. Later on, after the prince sees through a rigged gambling game, he is determined to teach the entertainers a lesson and help the players get their money back. Although the players doubt Chagum at first, he proves to them how the game is rigged. Chagum agrees to play an all-or-nothing round, betting his necklace for the money that was taken away. He luckily manages to win the round, having the money returned to the players as they celebrate his victory.
11	"Flower Wine for Tanda"; Transliteration: "Hanazake o Tanda ni" (Japanese: 花酒をタンダに)	June 16, 2007	August 22, 2009
Unhappy with her arranged marriage, Saya's soul leaves her body, something Tōya anticipated would happen. Tanda performs a soul summoning on his own to guide her back, with Balsa keeping watch. Tanda manages to find Saya, who tells him that she was forced into the marriage to prevent Tōya from punishment. Saya returns to her body and wakes up to Tōya, being taken away for nourishment. However, Tanda's soul later becomes trapped in the spirit realm, not knowing how to return to his body. Figuring out how the spirit realm is directly linked to the world of humans, Tanda connects with the egg of the water spirit inside Chagum's stomach, alerting Balsa and Chagum that he needs to drink the flower wine in order to return to his body.
12	"The Summer Solstice Festival"; Transliteration: "Geshimatsuri" (Japanese: 夏至祭)	June 23, 2007	August 29, 2009
The Summer Solstice Festival is drawing near, and the Rucha Festival Tournament will be held the next evening. A boy named Yarsam challenges one of the village boys to a sparring match, which he proves to be quite skilled at. After Yarsam leaves in disappointment, Chagum challenges Yarsam to a match during the festival tournament. Chagum asks Balsa to train him for this fight, but she advises him to lie low and avoid going to the tournament. He ignores her advice and goes there anyhow. During the fight, Chagum dodges Yarsam and makes him fall out of the ring, thereby winning the match. Soon after, as Yarsam's father comes to take him away, Balsa arrives and challenges his father to a match herself. She flips Yarsam's father over onto the ground, defeating him as a result.
13	"Neither Human nor Tiger"; Transliteration: "Hito de naku, Tora de naku" (Japanese: 人でなく虎でなく)	June 30, 2007	September 12, 2009
Balsa gets challenged to a duel via letter by a former rival named Karbo, but she declines when she meets with him. Karbo hires a stone shooter named Gyopsal to target a traveling couple, named Tandor and Sena, in order to draw out her anger. Attempting to protect the couple during a downpour, she stays at an abandoned hut with them for the time being. Balsa is unable to get any sleep because Gyopsal was ordered to shoot stones at her all night until sunrise. When the couple prepares to leave, Balsa explains her situation to them. When Karbo reveals himself, Balsa engages in a fierce duel against him with overwhelming anger. She slashes him but assumes that she may have killed him, having broken her vow never to take another life.
14	"The Knot"; Transliteration: "Musubime" (Japanese: 結び目)	July 7, 2007	September 19, 2009
Torogai makes contact with the water creatures of the spirit realm and finds out that Chagum must die in order to protect the egg of the water spirit. Balsa, after realizing that she has not broken her vow, find Torogai in a pool of charcoal oil in a rice terrace and takes her to be treated by Tanda. Torogai has discovered that the official founding history of the magic weavers is false. Shuga learns through the ancient stone scrolls that the egg of the water spirit would bestow blessings of water to the kingdom. Torogai recounts how she escaped from the Knot, where the spirit realm and the world of humans intersect. She is confronted by a fire creature, who chases her within a cave. After passing through an underground river, she is engulfed by a giant worm, which brings her up the rice terrace in the first place. Hibitonan locks Shuga inside the sacred chambers during his studies on the drought sign.
15	"Unexpected Death"; Transliteration: "Yōsetsu" (Japanese: 夭折)	July 14, 2007	September 26, 2009
While Chagum goes out to look for some yamabime, split-opened purple fruit, in the mountains, Torogai tells Balsa and Tanda that Chagum is destined to die and that the egg of the water spirit will hatch during the Spring Equinox. In the sacred chambers, Shuga has found proof that Chagum is still alive as well, and he is secretly released from the sacred chambers after Hibitonan leaves. Shuga wishes to tell Sagum the good news, but the latter is gradually weakening in poor health. Shuga instead decides not to tell him. Shuga purchases a horse and travels toward the canyon. Gakai visits Sagum, who is soon about to die.
16	"With All One's Heart"; Transliteration: "Tada Hitasura ni" (Japanese: ただひたすらに)	July 21, 2007	October 3, 2009
Hibitonan sends Mon and Zen to prevent Shuga from going down into the canyon, since that is where Chagum and Balsa were said to be killed. Shuga then learns that Sagum has finally died from overwork and grief. He reveals his interpretation of the inscriptions to Hibitonan, mentioning that Chagum is still alive and that the water spirit must be born in order to prevent the drought. Armed with this knowledge, Shuga is granted permission by the Emperor to lead the secret hunters to search for Chagum and bring him back. After the hunters travel to an errand shop run by Tōya and Saya, Zen and Yun discreetly obtain records from the order book to track the prince down. Shuga goes out and looks for Chagum and Balsa, while Zen and Yun follow Tōya back to the village.
17	"The Water Mill Burns"; Transliteration: "Suisha Moyu" (Japanese: 水車燃ゆ)	July 28, 2007	October 10, 2009
Shuga, locating him in the city, wants to escort Chagum back to the palace, but Shuga is soon stopped by Balsa. He informs of Sagum's recent death, raising a grave concern for Chagum. After Balsa takes Chagum away from Shuga, they head back to meet up with Tanda. Meanwhile, Zen and Yun have found the watermill in the village, not knowing Tōya went inside. Come nightfall, Jin finds Shuga, who mentions about his encounter with Chagum earlier during the day. When Mon, Zen, and Yun prepare their ambush, they see the watermill on fire. Tōya set it on fire to warn Balsa of the ambush. Seeing the fire, Balsa takes Chagum with her, and they set off with Tanda and Torogai to Tomi Village.
18	"The Ancient Village"; Transliteration: "Inishie no Mura" (Japanese: いにしえの村)	August 4, 2007	October 17, 2009
Chagum, Balsa, Tanda, and Torogai travel to Tomi Village in the hope of learning the ancient story of the water spirit. Shuga and the hunters, after realizing that Balsa is aware of the water spirit inside Chagum, prepare their journey to Tomi Village as well. Chagum and company locate the village and meet the village headmaster named Soya. He invites them to his house, where a girl named Nimka explains the ancient story told by her grandmother. Chagum is horrified to learn that the guardian of the spirit must die in the hands of a mythical Egg Eater for the spirit to be born.
19	"Escape"; Transliteration: "Chagumu Tōbō" (Japanese: チャグム逃亡)	August 11, 2007	October 24, 2009
Chagum runs away with Nimka early in the morning in an attempt to return to the palace and to avoid being killed by the Egg Eater. Determined to keep Chagum safe, Balsa goes after him in the mountains. Seeing his distress, Balsa allows Chagum to charge at her using her spear. However, as she grabs the blade, she slaps Chagum onto the ground, vowing to keep him alive even if she must sacrifice her life. Shuga and the hunters arrive at Tomi Village, demanding Soya to return the prince back to them.
20	"To Hunter's Hole"; Transliteration: "Kariana" (Japanese: 狩穴へ)	August 18, 2007	October 31, 2009
Torogai explains to Shuga that the prince will be inevitably killed by the Egg Eater once the egg of the water spirit hatches. He agrees to return to the court and decipher the remainder of the ancient stone scrolls. Shuga later goes to see Gakai, who has been relieved of his position due to Sagum's death. Nevertheless, Shuga pleads for Gakai to assist him in his studies. Chagum, Balsa, Tanda, and Torogai move into a cave named Hunter's Hole, where they gather firewood and food to prepare for the winter season. Soon, winter arrives and the mountains become impassable.
21	"Jiguro Musa"; Transliteration: "Jiguro Musa" (Japanese: ジグロ·ムサ)	August 25, 2007	November 7, 2009
Balsa tells Chagum the story of how she met Jiguro Musa twenty-four years ago. Karna Yansa, her father, was ordered to poison the king of Kanbal by Logsam, the king's younger brother, in which failing to comply would have Balsa killed. Karna Yansa turns to his friend, Jiguro, one of the king's nine elite hunters, and requests him to take Balsa away from Kanbal. After Jiguro defeats one of the hunters sent by the king, he takes Balsa to the swordsmith to have a new spear forged in seven days time. In the middle of the night, Jiguro encounters Tagul, another one of the hunters, being forced to fight to the death. After killing him, Jiguro weeps over the corpse of his companion. After finding about when and why her father had died, Balsa was determined to get her revenge by becoming a spear wielder. At first, Jiguro wanted to avoid Balsa going through a life full of bloodshed, but he later decides to train her in the martial arts. When winter came, the six remaining hunters sent by the king find the two in the mountains. While Balsa hides in the bushes, the six hunters surround Jiguro, as they prepare to attack him.
22	"Season of Awakening"; Transliteration: "Mezame no Toki" (Japanese: 目覚めの季)	September 1, 2007	November 14, 2009
Balsa witnesses as Jiguro takes out each hunter one by one. From that day on, Balsa swore an oath to save the same number of lives that Jiguro had taken away for her protection. Five years later, Logsam is said to be dead during his reign. Jiguro became ill and eventually died after telling Balsa how fond he was of her. After hearing this story, Chagum wants Balsa to train him as they await spring. At night, it is hinted that Tanda wants to spend the rest of his life with Balsa, but he cannot admit to it. The next day, Chagum finds himself floating above a canyon in the spirit realm full of giant insects. With Balsa's arms around him and Tanda's voice guiding him, they manage to calm him down and bring his soul back.
23	"In Search of the Shigu Salua"; Transliteration: "Shigu Sarua o Otte" (Japanese: シグ·サルアを追って)	September 8, 2007	November 21, 2009
Later, spring has arrived and Chagum has grown both physically and mentally, being given new clothes and his own sword. Chagum, Balsa, Tanda, and Torogai embark on a journey to Aoike Pond, later reuniting with Shuga and the hunters. Shuga explains that the Egg Eater shows weakness against fire. The power of the water spirit begins to influence Chagum's actions, walking to the middle of the pond and eating a sig salua, resembling that of a lotus flower. Just then, the Egg Eater appears to claim the egg, but the hunters manage to repel it with fire torches. Although the Egg Eater attempts to devour Chagum, the egg of the water spirit shields him, and he then starts running uphill.
24	"The Last Hope"; Transliteration: "Saigo no Kibō" (Japanese: 最後の希望)	September 15, 2007	November 28, 2009
Balsa and Tanda, along with the hunters, are unable to catch up to Chagum, since the egg of the water spirit is controlling the way he moves. Balsa answers to the question about why she did not kill the hunters when she had the chance, saying that she has an oath of her own to keep. Shuga and Torogai learn a messenger sent by Gakai that the water spirit will be born in another location and race to get there before dawn. When Balsa and Tanda encounters two Egg Eaters, Tanda learns how to harm the creatures by eating the sig saluas, allowing the group to kill one of them.
25	"Celebration"; Transliteration: "Utage" (Japanese: 宴)	September 22, 2007	December 12, 2009
Tanda gives Balsa, along with the hunters, some sig saluas to pursue the Egg Eater and save Chagum. As Chagum finally makes it to Sanaan, Balsa and the hunters locate him. In this area, the spirit realm and the world of human are merged. Balsa and the hunters manage to hold off endless waves of Egg Eaters long enough for the sun to rise. Come sunrise, Balsa and Tanda successfully extracts the egg and Chagum's life is saved. When Balsa sees a single nahji, a type of sacred bird, leaves its flock, she throws the egg high up into the sky for the nahji to catch with its beak, as it flies back to its flock.
26	"Departure"; Transliteration: "Tabidachi" (Japanese: 旅立ち)	September 29, 2007	December 19, 2009
Chagum returns to the palace and is now the crowned prince and the child of heaven. While Chagum is reunited with his mother, Balsa contemplates the future. After Balsa, Tanda, and Torogai were awarded by the Emperor for protecting Chagum, they resume their journey back home. However, Mon and Jin leads them to see Chagum one last time in his garden. Although he initially wants run away with them, he gains the resolve and the courage to stay. Balsa says her last farewell to Chagum as they part ways. Torogai is staying at Tanda's hut in the mountains for a while. Tanda is seen at Tōya and Saya's errand shop, explaining that Balsa has one thing left to do in order to fulfill her vow. Balsa has departed for Kanbal as rain finally begins to pour over Yogo.

== See also ==
- Guardian series
- Moribito: Guardian of the Spirit
