= Moribito II: Guardian of the Darkness =

1999 novel by Nahoko Uehashi

- Front cover of English publication

闇の守り人 (Yami no Moribito)
- Genre: Fantasy
- Novel
- Written by: Nahoko Uehashi
- Illustrated by: Makiko Futaki (Hardcover, Japan); Yūkei Nakagawa (Bunkoban); Yuko Shimizu (US)
- Published by: Kaisei-Sha Publishing Co., Ltd. (Hardcover); Shinchosha (Bunkoban)
- English publisher: NA: Scholastic
- Published: January 1999 (Hardcover, Japan); June 2007 (Bunkoban); May 2009 (US)
- Audio drama
- Written by: Satoshi Maruo
- Station: NHK FM Broadcast
- Original run: April 15, 2007 – April 27, 2007
- Episodes: 10
- Manga
- Written by: Nahoko Uehashi
- Illustrated by: Yū
- Published by: Asahi Shimbun
- Magazine: Nemuki+
- Original run: August 12, 2014 – December 13, 2017
- Volumes: 3

Moribito II: Guardian of the Darkness is the second book in the Moribito series, a series of fantasy novels by Japanese author Nahoko Uehashi. It was written in 1999 and published by Kaisei-Sha Publishing Co., Ltd. in hardcover format and by Shinchosha in bunkoban format. The English translation was published in 2009 by Arthur A. Levine Books, an imprint of Scholastic. The novel follows the main character of the first book, Balsa, as she returns to her home country following the events of Moribito: Guardian of the Spirit. The title refers to the mysterious spirits known as hyohlu who play a large role in the book.

A manga adaptation of Moribito II: Guardian of the Darkness by Yū was published in Asahi Shimbun Publications' shōjo magazine Nemuki+ from August 12, 2014.

== Synopsis ==
It has been a year since Balsa protected the egg of the Water Spirit from Rarunga. Balsa is traveling through caves in the Misty Blue Mountains on her way home to Kanbal. In the caves, she smells a lantern and discovers the siblings Gina and Kassa defending themselves from a strange spirit creature, a hyohlu, that Balsa drives off. It leaves behind a rare stone that is extremely valuable, luisha.

Balsa sends the pair on their way. Despite attempting to cover up the event, Kassa and Gina are forced to tell the truth to the Musa clan chief, Kaguro, after the luisha is revealed. Also present is his brother, Yuguro, a national hero and leader of the King's Spears, the elite generals of Kanbal. Yuguro sends soldiers to capture Balsa with orders to kill her on the way back. Balsa is staying with her aunt Yuka where she learns that the late King Rogsam blamed Jiguro for the death of his brother, King Naguru, and Jiguro is a national disgrace. Yuguro became a hero because he claimed to have killed his traitorous brother, Jiguro, and redeemed his clan. Balsa knows this is a lie — they had met and devised a method to absolve the clan but never fought each other. While staying with Yuka, Balsa is captured and poisoned. She escapes and saves a strange supernatural creature from harm. In return, the creature brings help for Balsa in the form of the herder people and their chief, Toto.

As Balsa heals, the Giving Ceremony is about to begin. Kanbal is a poor land. Once every ten years, the Mountain King throws open the door to his realm. The King of Kanbal and the King's Spears descended into the mountain with offerings. Additionally they battle each other and the strongest becomes the Dancer. The Dancer faces the strongest hyohlu warrior of the Mountain King in the ceremonial spear dance to gain the luisha that Kanbal needs to survive. Further details of the ceremony have been lost but it is known that the Mountain King had accepted the ceremony as an apology from the Kanbal king for trespassing deep into his domain out of greed. The Giving Ceremony has been delayed many years and Kanbal is in danger of starvation. Goaded by Yuguro, the inexperienced King Radalle planned to use the ritual to conquer the Mountain King and take all the luisha. Toto of the Herder People tells Balsa that such an act would end in failure since the hyohlu would react upon reading the Dancer's intents in their hearts. Hence, any attempt at treachery would ensure Kanbal's destruction and she must stop it. They recruit Kassa to their side and visit Chief Laloog of the Yonsa, the only one still alive who knows the truth of the Giving Ceremony. Balsa convinces him to break his vow of silence. Laloog drafts a letter revealing the truth of the Ceremony and begging the king to abandon the plan. Before leaving, Laloog tells them to read it at the very moment the ceremony begins.

The Giving Ceremony begins in the ceremonial chamber and Yuguro defeats the others to become the Dancer. Balsa and Kassa emerge from hiding to read Laloog's letter and beg the king to abandon the plan as the hyohlu arrive. Yuguro convinces the king to dismiss them as illusions and Balsa defeats him as the truth of the Ceremony is revealed: The hyohlu are guardian spirits who are the previous ceremony's deceased human participants. The room is plunged into darkness and the strongest hyohlu appears: Jiguro Musa. Sensing Yuguro's ill intent, Jiguro is about to kill him when Balsa challenges her foster father to battle. After facing off against the grudges from the past generation of the King's Spears and letting go of her own grudges, she completes the ceremony as the Dancer upon letting Jiguro pierce her heart. With that, the ceremonial chamber's occupants are briefly transported to the spirit realm and meet the Mountain King; a gigantic spirit serpent that takes the offerings in exchange for shedding his skin, which coated with mineral light left by the hyohlu - the luisha. With that, Kanbal is saved from starvation. Back in the material realm, the herder people, who share a connection to both realms, have all participants sworn to secrecy. For all participants would become hyohlu upon death and guard Kanbal until being surpassed by their own successors. This is due to the spiritual bond formed between the spear dance's participants. Unable to let go of his grudges against Jiguro, Yuguro is left in a catatonic state as his soul was lost in the darkness. It is hoped that the next Dancers would be able to give his soul peace once the ceremony is conducted again. With her business in Kanbal concluded along with Jiguro and Balsa's guilt privately cleared by the king, Balsa decides to return to New Yogo and her friend Tanda.

== Reception ==
The novel received the Mildred L. Batchelder Award from the American Library Association in 2010.

Daniel Baird reviewed this book and its sequel for Mythprint, praising them as enjoyable both by children and adults, calling the second volume "enjoyable, if quick read".
