= List of Erin episodes =

Cover art of the first compilation DVD of The Beast Player Erin featuring the titular character

The 50-episode Erin (獣の奏者エリン, Kemono no Sōja Erin) anime aired on NHK from January 10 to December 26, 2009. The series was based on The Beast Player novel series by Nahoko Uehashi and was directed by Takayuki Hamana. The first opening theme is "Shizuku" (雫) by Sukima Switch, and the first ending theme is "After the Rain" by cossami. From episode 31, the opening theme is again "Shizuku" but sung by Hajime Chitose, and the second ending, "Kitto Tsutaete" by Takako Matsu is used from episode 30 onwards. The series was streamed on Crunchyroll with English subtitles on September 4, 2009.

== Episode list ==
No.	Title	Directed by	Written by	Original release date
1	"Erin the Green-Eyed"; Transliteration: "Midori no Me no Erin" (Japanese: 緑の目のエリン)	Takayuki Hamana; Kazunobu Fuseki	Junichi Fujisaku	January 10, 2009
The first episode, introduces the heroine of the story; a 10-year-old girl named Erin and her mother Soh-yon, a beastinarian who cares for Tohda in the Tai-Koh region in the Village of Ake. Erin is a curious little girl and this often gets her into trouble, but it also fuels her interest in the Tohda that her mother cares for. This includes an infant who will soon be sent to the "pond," an underground series of tunnels where the Tohda are cared for. When the baby Tohda that Soh-yon authorized to have put in the pond goes missing, Erin takes it upon herself to defend her mother and find the baby herself along with two of her friends from the village. After investigating the baby's enclosure she finds it hiding in a hole in the wall. After handing it up to her friends she is attacked by a grown Tohda, however Soh-yon arrives in time to save her. After explaining that the baby ran away due to the old straw creating heat and smelling like the older Tohda, Wadan, another Tohda caretaker, is chastised be the village chief and Soh-yon for ignoring her instructions. After Erin tells her mother that she wants to be a "Tohda doctor" like her, Soh-yon reminds Erin that Tohda are wild animals, something she has yet to learn.
2	"Soh-Yon the Healer"; Transliteration: "Ijutsu Shi no Soyon" (Japanese: 医術師のソヨン)	Daisuke Tsukushi; Kazunobu Fuseki	Junichi Fujisaku	January 17, 2009
While Erin is with her friends caring for the village goats she notices a poisonous plant called capracide growing in the fields that could kill the herd and asks the villagers to help her remove it. A Touda rider named Tairan from a neighboring village comes to the Village of Ake seeking medicinal help for his Touda who hasn't been eating. Soh-Yon is called to help but cannot immediately diagnose the cause of the Tohda's illness. Later on, Saju and Erin watch Tairan catch fish and he explains he often catches fish on the battlefield for him and his Tohda. When the Tohda starts shivering the three go to see it and after smelling the cooked fish Saju has it goes berserk and attacks her, but Soh-yon subdues it with her whistle. Later on while looking for any blooming capracide, Erin is found be Tairin. She explains her research on the plant shows that its effects match the Tohda's behavior, however they should have shown up sooner. When Tairan goes to catch more fish, Erin realizes that the Tohda hasn't been eating because it wants fish not goat meat. When the Tohda ignores the fish in the water, Erin takes a risk and attempts to hand-feed it and is successful. She then realizes that the Tohda got capracide poisoning from the nearby water that contained capracide flowers. Afterwards while in the pond Soh-yon decides to teach Erin everything she knows about Tohda so Erin can became a doctor.
3	"The Battling Beast"; Transliteration: "Tatakau Kemono" (Japanese: 闘う獣)	Kōdai Kakimoto; Kazunobu Fuseki	Sayaka Harada	January 24, 2009
The village prepares to welcome the Grand Duke and a relative of the queen to watch the Tohda's training. Erin learns from her mother that at a certain age all Tohda in the village must have a lid called an "ear-web" that covers their ears cut off so that they can hear the Silent Whistles and be tamed, even the baby Tohda Lulu. The Grand Duke has a meeting with Damiya, and Damiya convinces him to not only allow his eldest son Shunan to ride a Tohda, but his youngest Nunan as well. After learning that she cannot attend the training Erin instead decides to help collect ingredients. However when she and her friends hear gongs they go to a cliff edge and are able to look over at the training grounds. Erin is displeased to see that the Tohda are treated like toys and forcibly commanded using Silent Whistles. After Shunan and Nunan finish their demonstrations, one of the Tohda goes berserk and attacks the others. Shunan and Nunan work together to restrain it and are able to use the Silent Whistle to calm it down. After everything calms down the chief decides that the village must increase the amount of Tohda they have, and Wadan suggests they cut off Lulu's ear-webs early to accelerate his growth. Erin in incredibly upset when her mother tell her and wonders if the Tohda are really meant to go to war. She tell Soh-yon that she wants to hear the Tohda's words and make sure what happened at training doesn't happen to Lulu.
4	"Secret in the Mist"; Transliteration: "Kiri no Nakano Himitsu" (Japanese: 霧の中の秘密)	Takashi Andō; Kazunobu Fuseki	Midori Gotō	January 31, 2009
Erin hears that Shaju's older sister has been engaged while watching the dowry from the groom's village enter the main gates. Shaju's father works late into the night in the pond to buy Soju an expensive gift. But while eating a rice cake, Soju, Shaju's sister, suddenly falls ill. Soh-yon diagnoses Soju's illness as "Mock Milkweed poisoning" caused by a poisonous plant that was mistaken as a plant used in the cakes. The poison will spread throughout her body in three days and kill her in a week. To get the medicine from a neighboring village would take too long so Soh-yon decides to ask her clan, the Mist People, for the medicine using the hairpin Soju's father bought and some of the village's money as payment. Soh-yon and Erin leave the payment and a letter in a tree on Cone Mountain and Soh-yun tells Erin that she will have to retrieve the medicine the Mist People leave after the mountain is covered in mist. Erin watches the mountain diligently the next few days and in the middle of the night when she sees the mist, Erin rushes up the mountain to wait for the medicine to be delivered. After falling asleep in the tree she is awoken by the arrival of a man from the Mist People who tries to leave, but after Erin begs him for the medicine he gives it to her. The next morning Soju awakes and confides to Soh-yun that she believes that her father doesn't care for her because he is always working instead of spending Soju's last few days in the village with her. Soh-yun explains the situation and Soju's father gives her a hairpin he made with Tohda scales. While watching Soju leave the village, Soh-yon wonders if Erin will do the same one day, but Erin smiles and says she will always be with her mother.
5	"Erin and the Egg Thief"; Transliteration: "Erin to Tamago Dorobō" (Japanese: エリンと卵泥棒)	Kenichi Matsuzawa; Kazunobu Fuseki	Fumiyo Sakai	February 7, 2009
The village prepares for the annual egg hunt in which the village men travel to the swamps to find Tohda eggs. When Erin realizes that the eggs they find will be treated the same as Lulu, who seems to have forgotten her after having his ear-webs removed, she is upset. Soh-yon asks her if being a bestiary is what she truly wants and decides to take her on the egg hunt. On the way to the swamp the group is spotted by two thieves named Nuk and Mok who decide to steal the eggs they find. After finding several empty nests Wadan suggests that maybe there is someone stealing the eggs. Erin hears the thieves crying for help after they got stuck in the mud and spotted by a Tohda. Erin uses an overhanging branch to pull them out but falls in front of the Tohda in the process. The Tohda ignores her and walks into a nearby cave. As it passes, she notices its large belly and tells her mother who believes the Tohda is pregnant and goes to investigate. When Wadan arrives he decides to head inside with the villagers because he doesn't trust Soh-yon to handle it alone and Erin follows. After finding Soh-yon, the group watches as the Tohda lays its eggs. Soh-yon distracts the Tohda so they can get the eggs, but it comes back and attacks the group. After it is subdued Erin runs forward and tries to protect the eggs and their mother, but Soh-yun talks her down by telling her a bestiary's duty isn't to the animals but the people who live with them. Nuk and Mok defend Erin, but after being accused of stealing the eggs they run off. Soh-yun apologizes to Wadan for Erin's behavior, leaving Erin sad not only for the Tohda, but for troubling her mother as well.
6	"Soh-Yon's Warmth"; Transliteration: "Soyon No Nukumori" (Japanese: ソヨンのぬくもり)	Daisuke Takashima; Kazunobu Fuseki	Reiko Yoshida	February 14, 2009
On a rainy night, Soh-yon is summoned to the underground Tohda ponds. There, Soh-yon finds all the Kiba, the Grand Duke's most prized Tohda, dead. Knowing what would happen next, Soh-yon decides to spend the entire day with Erin. But later that night, soldiers come to the house. It was only then that Erin learned that her mother was going to be sentenced to death.
7	"Mother's Whistle"; Transliteration: "Haha no Yubibue" (Japanese: 母の指笛)	Kazunobu Fuseki	Junichi Fujisaku	February 21, 2009
Soh-yon is executed by the way of the Tohda after the Grand Duke's Kiba mysteriously die. Erin jumps into a lake full of Tohda in an attempt to save her bleeding mother, but her mother has her whisked away to safety while she is eaten alive to atone for her sins.
8	"Joh-on the Beekeeper"; Transliteration: "Hachikai no Joun" (Japanese: 蜂飼(はちか) いのジョウン)	Akihiro Saitō; Kazunobu Fuseki	Junichi Fujisaku	February 28, 2009
Joh-on, a beekeeper living in the Shin-Oh region, finds the unconscious Erin floating in the river. He rescues her and nurses her to health, as she attempts to cope with the loss of her mother.
9	"Honey and Erin"; Transliteration: "Hachimitsu to Erin" (Japanese: ハチミツとエリン)	Daisuke Tsukushi; Kazunobu Fuseki	Sayaka Harada	March 7, 2009
While staying with the beekeeper Joh-on, Erin decides to have Joh-on teach her to be an animal breeder and live with him.
10	"Birds of Dawn"; Transliteration: "Yoake no Tori" (Japanese: 夜明けの鳥)	Takahiro Natori; Kazunobu Fuseki	Daishirō Tanimura	March 14, 2009
Erin and Joh-on both go to the capital to shop for supplies. There, Erin meets a man named Ia-lu, a Seh-zan, playing a lullaby "Birds of Dawn" on the harp. Later, Erin meets Ia-lu again, who was about to kill Nuk and Mok, the two former egg thieves she met in Ake. While hearing a woman nearby singing "Birds of Dawn," she manages to convince Ia-lu from killing them. Ia-lu gives Erin his harp and the two former egg thieves say that they will follow Erin to repay her for her kindness.
11	"Inside the Door"; Transliteration: "Tobira no Naka ni" (Japanese: とびらの中に)	Kenichi Matsuzawa; Kazunobu Fuseki	Midori Gotō	March 21, 2009
Joh-on decides to have the entire family move to his summer cottage in the mountains. While cleaning his regular home, Erin finds out that Joh-on used to be a teacher. But when Erin finds Nuk and Mok sick from eating some rotten food, Joh-on comes and helps Erin read a book about poisonous plants. He decides to teach Erin, Nuk and Mok about animal breeding and plants.
12	"The Silver Feather"; Transliteration: "Hakugin no Hane" (Japanese: 白銀の羽)	Shinsuke Terasawa; Kazunobu Fuseki	Fumiyo Sakai	March 28, 2009
Erin finds a large, silver feather in a tree close to Joh-on's summer cabin high in the mountain. Joh-on tells Erin about the king of beasts, the Ohju, and Erin's interest in the Ohju begins to grow.
13	"The Valley of the Ohju"; Transliteration: "Ōjū no Tani" (Japanese: 王獣の谷)	Takashi Andō; Kazunobu Fuseki	Reiko Yoshida	April 4, 2009
While climbing down a cliff, Joh-on slips and falls onto a ledge of the steep cliff. Erin goes out and finds the hurt Joh-on, and decides to stay with him until morning came. While on the ledge, Erin and Joh-on witness a wild Tohda about to eat a baby Ohju. All of a sudden, they see the mother Ohju fly into action to save her baby and eat the Tohda.
14	"People of the Mist"; Transliteration: "Kiri no Tani" (Japanese: 霧の民)	Takayuki Hamana; Kazunobu Fuseki	Junichi Fujisaku	April 11, 2009
The first recap episode; Nah-son, a scout sent by the Mist Elders to watch over Soh-yon, tells the Elders what happened to Soh-yon and her daughter Erin. He tells the Elders that Erin is alive, and is now 14. She is living with a beekeeper named Joh-on and 2 former thieves, Nuk and Mok. He vows to always watch over Erin to repent for not saving Soh-yon.
15	"The Two's Past"; Transliteration: "Futari no Kako" (Japanese: ふたりの過去)	Akihiro Saitō; Kazunobu Fuseki	Junichi Fujisaku	April 18, 2009
Joh-on's son comes and asks his father to become a teacher again. When his son learned that his dad had a young girl living with him, he offered to have her come live with them and have Erin marry-off. But Joh-on decides that he's happier with Erin and asks his son to deliver a letter to an old friend at an Ohju breeding school.
16	"Ia-lu the Seh-zan"; Transliteration: "Sezan no Iaru" (Japanese: 堅き楯(セ·ザン) のイアル)	Daisuke Tsukushi; Kazunobu Fuseki	Fumiyo Sakai	April 25, 2009
While in town, Erin accidentally breaks the harp Ia-lu the Seh-zan gave to her when she was 10. She goes to a harp shop to have it fixed, where the carpenter Yantoku was Ia-lu's friend. Ia-lu coincidentally happened to be in the shop when Erin came and immediately recognized the green-eyed girl he met 4 years ago. But after she left, Ia-lu was ordered by his troop to kill his teacher, Hagaru, due to treason. He fixed the harp and went to kill Hagaru.
17	"Shin-Oh in Danger"; Transliteration: "Nerawareta Shin'ō" (Japanese: 狙われた真王)	Yumi Kamakura; Kazunobu Fuseki	Sayaka Harada	May 2, 2009
At a festival celebrating the Shin-Oh's birthday, Ia-lu the Seh-zan, along with a baby Ohju, are injured by an assassin's arrow during an attempt on the Shin-Oh's life.
18	"Master Esal"; Transliteration: "Kyōdōshi Esaru" (Japanese: 教導師エサル)	Daisuke Takashima; Kazunobu Fuseki	Junichi Fujisaku	May 9, 2009
Erin passes the entrance exam with flying colors and becomes a Kazalm student. There, she meets the Reverend of Teachers at Kazalm, Esal, who is also an old friend of Joh-on. And from there, Joh-on and Erin say their tearful good-byes.
19	"Friends at Kazalm"; Transliteration: "Kazarumu no Nakama" (Japanese: カザルムの仲間)	Takashi Andō; Kazunobu Fuseki	Reiko Yoshida	May 16, 2009
Erin begins to feel like she needs to be more like other students, losing sleep, and comedically falling asleep during her welcoming party. Her new friend Yuuyan told her that she can just be herself.
20	"The Ohju Named Lilan"; Transliteration: "Riran to Iu Na no Ōjū" (Japanese: リランという名の王獣)	Shinsuke Terasawa; Kazunobu Fuseki	Daishirō Tanimura	May 23, 2009
Professor Esal decides to let Erin take care of the baby Ohju Lilan after talking and observing her in action. She says that Tomura, the person who is currently talking care of Lilan, is not ready to take care of her yet.
21	"The Disappearing Light"; Transliteration: "Kiesō na Hikari" (Japanese: 消えそうな光)	Akihiro Saitō; Kazunobu Fuseki	Midori Gotō	May 30, 2009
Erin begins to take care of Lilan and finds out that Lilan won't eat anything, and has been eating her fur. When she hears Lilan's cries, she comes up with the idea to use her harp to try to communicate with Lilan. It didn't work, until she fell asleep and accidentally hit the harp under her blanket.
22	"The Harp's Sound"; Transliteration: "Tategoto no Hibiki" (Japanese: 竪琴の響き)	Takashi Andō; Kazunobu Fuseki	Junichi Fujisaku	June 6, 2009
Erin goes to the capital with Tomura and her two followers, Nuk and Mok, to go back to the Yantoku harp shop and change the harp to make a sound resembling an Ohju. They are allowed to borrow the shop for a few days while Yantoku is out. In another part of town, Ia-lu reopens his arrow wound while fighting against two unknown assailants, and stumbles upon Erin and her friends. They bring him into the shop and tend to his wound. After hearing Erin's story, Ia-lu decides to teach Erin how to fix the harp the way she wants to. With Ia-lu's help, Erin is able to make the sound she wanted and help Lilan eat again.
23	"The Oath of Kazalm"; Transliteration: "Kazarumu no Chikai" (Japanese: カザルムの誓い)	Daisuke Tsukushi; Kazunobu Fuseki	Junichi Fujisaku	June 13, 2009
Professor Esal talks to the other teachers at Kazalm about reporting to the palace of Erin's ability to communicate with Lilan with a harp, and not a Silent Whistle (It is considered against the law to not carry and use one as a beastinarian) and how she is able to become close to an Ohju. Esal tells the other teachers how she and Tomura also tried to use the harp to communicate with Lilan, but Lilan would just stare. Esal comes to the conclusion that the reason Lilan only reacts to Erin is because Lilan sees her as her mother. According to legends, only the Shin-Oh could command the Ohju. However, Erin can also do the same thing. Esal believes that if they report this to the palace, others would believe that Erin was able to command Lilan by using a magic trick of the Mist People, and not because of her own efforts. Also, she believes that the palace would use Erin's ability to communicate with the Ohju for war purposes. The teachers of Kazalm decide to keep Erin and the harp under wraps, and everyone in Kazalm makes an oath to protect Erin and Lilan.
24	"Song of Grief"; Transliteration: "Nageki no Uta" (Japanese: 嘆きの歌)	Daisuke Takashima; Kazunobu Fuseki	Sayaka Harada	June 20, 2009
The Grand Duke's two sons' paths finally diverge, with Shunan and Nugan taking their own paths after a duel.
25	"An Errand for Two"; Transliteration: "Futari no otsukai" (Japanese: ふたりのおつかい)	Takashi Andō; Kazunobu Fuseki	Fumiyo Sakai	June 27, 2009
Nuk and Mok are helping out at Kazalm and are making more work for Karisa, the dorm mother, than helping her. After considering firing them because they couldn't carry out even half the work of a single man, she decides to give them another chance and asks them to go shopping for her. They leave for town, determined not to disappoint her but end up losing the bag filled with five pieces of gold. Just as they were about to give up hope, Mok remembered how they had met Erin and had promised that they'd never be thieves again. And so they go in search of ways to earn the money back so they can return to Erin's side.
26	"Lilan's Feelings"; Transliteration: "Riran no Kokoro" (Japanese: リランの心)	Shinsuke Terasawa; Kazunobu Fuseki	Reiko Yoshida	July 4, 2009
Erin takes a quiz and fails it, so Erin and the others study hard so they can advance into high school at Kazalm. After the exam, everyone leaves for summer vacation. Lilan walks up to Erin one day and starts to snuggle her; it was then that Erin realized that Lilan saw her as her mother, and that makes Erin very happy. She also finds out that Lilan can understand simple words like "wait" and "stop." Erin finally finds out from Esal that Lilan was a gift to the Shin-Oh and as such, can never go back into the wild.
27	"Fallen into Hikara"; Transliteration: "Hikara Niochite" (Japanese: ヒカラにおちて)	Akihiro Saitō; Kazunobu Fuseki	Kazunobu Fuseki	July 11, 2009
Erin starts to have dreams about a place filled with thick mist, and that her mother Soh-yon was being taken into "Hikara" the bad side of the afterworld. While Erin falls asleep next to Lilan, Soh-yon tells Erin that the mist in her dreams are an image of her hesitation and how she is lost in her feelings of sadness. With Joh-on and Soh-yon's encouragement (in her dreams) she vows to work harder after she wakes up.
28	"Joh-on's Death"; Transliteration: "Joun no Shi" (Japanese: ジョウンの死)	Takashi Andō; Kazunobu Fuseki	Reiko Yoshida	July 18, 2009
One morning Erin receives a letter from Joh-on's son stating simply that Joh-on died from heart disease. Erin becomes sullen and sad, but acts strong in front of Lilan. Professor Esal and the returned Tomura see that Erin is suffering. Esal decides to take her on a trip to Joh-on's hideout when they were still students. Erin then comes to terms with Joh-on's death and promises to live a life that will not sadden Joh-on. At the end of the day, Erin says to Joh-on's ghost, "Thank You... Dad."
29	"The Beast's Fangs"; Transliteration: "Kemono no Kiba" (Japanese: 獣の牙)	Daisuke Takashima; Kazunobu Fuseki	Daishirō Tanimura	July 25, 2009
Erin noticed Lilan was scratching herself against a tree trunk and thought of using a brush to groom her. She got the brothers, Mok and Nuk, to make her a bigger brush as the small brush was not efficient at grooming. However, while using the bigger brush, she accidentally hurt Lilan. Lilan was infuriated and injured Erin. Thereafter, Erin was told by Esal that the only reason Lilan is obedient to Erin is because Lilan is afraid of Erin. Erin becomes afraid to get near to Lilan due to the incident. However when the memories of the times she spent with Lilan came into her mind, she took up the courage and once again got close to Lilan.
30	"The Fourth Winter"; Transliteration: "Yonenme no Fuyu" (Japanese: 四年目の冬)	Shinsuke Terasawa; Kazunobu Fuseki	Junichi Fujisaku	August 1, 2009
A recap episode on Erin's stay at Kazalm; a four year time-skip where Erin is now 18 and a college student.
31	"Luminous Sky"; Transliteration: "Hikari no Sora" (Japanese: 光の空)	Daisuke Tsukushi; Kazunobu Fuseki	Midori Gotō	August 8, 2009
A new teacher, Kirik, comes to Kazalm Academy from the capital. The new teacher is a royal agent whose entire family was killed by Wajaku poison. While on a stroll, Erin and Lilan fall off a cliff, but are saved due to Lilan regaining her ability to fly. Kirik watches Erin flying on Lilan and is shocked that an Ohju is flying with a human on its back. While watching them in the sky, he mistakes Erin for his sister Taya.
32	"The Great Crime"; Transliteration: "Taizai" (Japanese: 大罪)	Akihiro Saitō; Kazunobu Fuseki	Sayaka Harada	August 22, 2009
After landing, Erin is confronted by Nah-Son, the agent sent by the Mist Elders to watch over her. He tells Erin he had known Soh-yon and asks her to make a difficult decision. He tells her the story of the once-prosperous Tohda-breeding country Ophalon. The King of Ophalon was ousted from his throne when he used Touda to attack neighboring countries to complete his dream of making Ophalon even more prosperous. He is saved by a woman with golden hair and eyes, who flew on an Ohju named Luke. He manages to convince the woman of breeding Ohju to attack Ophalon and show them that Tohda are no match for the Ohju. However, the Ohju become drunk on blood and they attack the town and its people until it becomes a wasteland. Afterwards, the woman leaves the Ephon Noha region and descends from the sky into Ryoza. The people there see her as a God and make her their queen; the woman's name was "Je" the First Shin-Oh of Ryoza. Nah-Son tells Erin to restrain Lilan's ability to fly, but Erin says that she will never stop Lilan from flying and will never tie her down with codes.
33	"Flying"; Transliteration: "Hishou" (Japanese: 飛翔)	Kenichi Matsuzawa; Kazunobu Fuseki	Fumiyo Sakai	August 29, 2009
Erin informs Professor Esal that Lilan can fly. Both of them are worried that Lilan will fly away from Kazalm. So, Esal wants Erin to teach Lilan to fly only when she wants to or they would have to chain Lilan down. After many days of Lilan not flying at Erin's command they plan to make the chains for Lilan's cage. One evening Kirik approaches Erin and they have a short conversation. Erin realizes that she has only been giving commands to Lilan and approaches Lilan once more. The next day Erin flies on top of Lilan.
34	"Ia-lu and Erin"; Transliteration: "Iaru to Erin" (Japanese: イアルとエリン)	Shinsuke Terasawa; Kazunobu Fuseki	Junichi Fujisaku	September 5, 2009
An injured Ohju is delivered from the Lazal rescue center. That night, Kirik poisons the injured Ohju with Mock Milkweed, a poisonous plant that is said to grow in the Tai-Koh region. The next day, the Kazalm staff find the Ohju sick, but Erin finds out what the cause is from her past encounter with it. A poison tester in the capital is also sick from Mock Milkweed, and Ia-lu volunteers to find the cure. Erin goes to the capital to find the antidote and meets Ia-lu again, who is also looking for the antidote. Ia-lu helps Erin deliver the antidote back to Kazalm because they were both targeted by the Psi-Gamul.
35	"A New Life"; Transliteration: "Atarashii Inochi" (Japanese: あたらしい命)	Takashi Andō; Kazunobu Fuseki	Kiyoko Yoshimura	September 12, 2009
Another injured Ohju is delivered to Kazalm, this time it is a wild male who they decided to call "Eku." The teachers try to calm the angry Eku themselves, but fail. Professor Esal decides to leave Eku to Erin. After a day's worth of staying with the angry Eku, Erin manages to gain his trust and communicate with him with her harp. Eku heals and goes out to the fields and meets Lilan. Lilan and Eku mate and "create a new life" with the whole of Kazalm watching in amazement.
36	"The Graduation Test"; Transliteration: "Sotsu Sha no Tameshi" (Japanese: 卒舎ノ試し)	Daisuke Takashima; Kazunobu Fuseki	Midori Gotō	September 19, 2009
Erin and the others take the Graduation Test with all of them passing. Erin takes the top seat in the scores, meaning that Erin can stay at Kazalm as a Master. The Shin-Oh gives her blessing to Lilan's baby and provides more funds for Kazalm. Each one of them leaves Kazalm and reminisces about their memories.
37	"Birth"; Transliteration: "Tanjou" (Japanese: 誕生)	Akihiro Saitō; Kazunobu Fuseki	Junichi Fujisaku	September 26, 2009
Erin officially becomes a Master in the fall and new students come to Kazalm. But Shiron, a female student, sees Erin as an enemy and desired to "beat her." When Shiron decides to approach Lilan one night, she is astonished to find out that Erin can embrace Lilan so closely, despite the fact that Ohju never befriend humans. When Shiron decides to approach Lilan again, she ends up angering Lilan, only to be saved by Erin. Shiron then witnesses Erin helping Lilan give birth, and has a new perspective of Erin, making Shiron decide to be Erin's follower. The Shin-Oh names the baby "Aru" and decides to visit the baby.
38	"Shin-Oh Harumiyah"; Transliteration: "Shin Ou Harumiya" (Japanese: 真王ハルミヤ)	Daisuke Tsukushi; Kazunobu Fuseki	Fumiyo Sakai	October 3, 2009
The Shin-Oh decides to visit Kazalm to see Aru. Esal and the faculty decide to keep the Shin-Oh from finding out that Erin uses the harp to communicate with Eku and Lilan. But when Lilan was about to hurt the Shin-Oh, Erin jumps in and surprises everyone by calming Lilan down with her harp. Dahmiyah confronts Erin and offers her and the Ohju family to move to Lazal, but is interrupted by the Shin-Oh. Impressed by her calm attitude and alternate way of breeding the Ohju, she also wants Erin to come with her. But Erin rejects, saying that Aru is not ready.
39	"Tohda Attack"; Transliteration: "Touda no Shuugeki" (Japanese: 闘蛇の襲撃)	Shinsuke Terasawa; Kazunobu Fuseki	Daishirō Tanimura	October 10, 2009
While going back to the palace by boat, the Shin-Oh is suddenly attacked by an army of Tohda in the river. Erin, along with the rest of the students and teachers of Kazalm, watch in horror. Erin decides to ride Lilan to save the Shin-Oh, but Kirik warns her that riding Lilan will make Erin regret it. When Erin gets to the attacking Tohda, Ia-lu and Dahmiyah are surprised to see Erin flying on Lilan's back. Lilan suddenly snaps and attacks the Tohda in a blind rage, deaf to Erin's cries to stop. For the first time, everyone witnesses the horrid side of the Ohju. And for Erin, this is a moment that she will never forget.
40	"A Nation in Shadow"; Transliteration: "Kageriyuku Kuni" (Japanese: かけりゆく国)	Takashi Andō; Kazunobu Fuseki	Sayaka Harada	October 17, 2009
The Shin-Oh is knocked unconscious after the sudden Tohda attack on the boat-ride to the palace, and stays at Lord Kazalm's home until she recovers. Ia-lu feels ashamed of not protecting Her Majesty, and awaits his punishment. Erin sees the aftermath of the attack, and decides to calm the worried men by playing "Birds of Dawn" on her harp. Ia-lu recognizes the song and finds Erin playing it. Erin tends to Ia-lu's wound from the Tohda, and she and Ia-lu talk. Erin tells Ia-lu that the Tohda attacking the ship weren't the Grand Duke's because they didn't have a mark on their tails. Erin then reveals to Ia-lu that she is a Wajyaku, and is from a Tohda breeding village. Throughout the night she tells him about her life; her home village, her mother, and how she ended up in the Shin-Oh region. The next morning, Erin leaves for the school and Ia-lu promises her that he will keep her story a secret until the time is ready.
41	"The Truth of the Shin-Oh"; Transliteration: "Shin Ou no Shinjitsu" (Japanese: 真王の真実)	Daisuke Takashima; Kazunobu Fuseki	Kiyoko Yoshimura	October 24, 2009
Erin is called to the Kazalm palace, and is asked to accompany the Shin-Oh back to the royal palace with Lilan as bodyguards. Erin knows that if she accepted it, Lilan and Erin would be deprived of the freedom they had in Kazalm. Erin asks for an audience with only the Shin-Oh and Seh-zan Ia-lu, and decides to tell them about the First Shin-Oh Je and the incident with her Ohju Luke. But what Erin didn't expect from the Shin-Oh was that she didn't know anything about the ancient incident. Then Erin tells the Shin-Oh about her past and why she strongly believes that Lilan and her family deserve their freedom. The Shin-Oh understands and lets Erin decide what's best for Lilan's family. But what happened next was totally unexpected: Professor Esal comes to Erin in Lilan's shed the next day saying, "The Shin-Oh is dead."
42	"Seimiyah's Tears"; Transliteration: "Seimiya no Namida" (Japanese: セイミヤの涙)	Akihiro Saitō; Kazunobu Fuseki	Reiko Yoshida	October 31, 2009
Word of the Shin-Oh's sudden death on the way back to the palace has spread, and everyone mourns for the death of their beloved Shin-Oh. And as tradition states, Princess Seimiyah must take the throne. But Seimiyah is not sure if she is ready, and battles with her inner demons. Shunan comes to the Royal Capital and talks with Seimiyah, but Seimiyah stubbornly refuses. Not knowing of Erin or Ia-lu's knowledge of the truth, Seimiyah believes that it was the Grand Duke's Tohda that killed her grandmother. Standing in the rain one night, Seimiyah and Shunan go their separate ways.
43	"Beast Healer"; Transliteration: "Kemono no Ijutsusha" (Japanese: 獣の医術師)	Kenichi Matsuzawa; Kazunobu Fuseki	Midori Gotō	November 7, 2009
Beastinarians from Lazal come, learning about Erin's ability to tame Ohju without the use of a Silent Whistle, despite the fact that she is supposed to carry one under Law. They order Erin into using the whistle on Lilan, but Erin refuses. As one of the beastinarians blows a whistle, Lilan goes into a blind rage and injures the beastinarians. This forces Erin to use the Silent Whistle on Lilan. The whistle gives Lilan a horrifying aftershock and she bites off several of Erin's fingers. This causes Erin to understand what her mother meant by "Tohda are beasts." From there, Erin decides to go onto the path of the "Beast Healer" a beastinarian who shares the joys and pains of the Ohju and uses the Silent Whistle, just like her mother did with the Touda. Erin is ordered to go to the Royal Palace with Lilan and her family.
44	"Akun-Meh-Chai"; Transliteration: "Akun・Me・Chai" (Japanese: アクン・メ・チャイ)	Daisuke Tsukushi; Kazunobu Fuseki	Fumiyo Sakai	November 14, 2009
As the war between the Shin-Oh and the Tai-Koh regions begins, Erin is called to the palace by Dahmiyah. While in there, he orders Erin to create a battalion of Ohju to use for the war. Erin refuses to breed the Ohju for war, due to the fear of repeating the mistake of the First Shin-Oh Je. Erin tells Dahmiyah that she is an "Akun-Meh-Chai" a "Child of Impossibilities" because Erin herself is a child of a Tohda breeding man and a woman of the Mist People, two people that were said to never be able to be together. She tells Dahmiyah that only she can control the Ohju, and successfully demonstrates it. Dahmiyah tells Erin to continue to breed the Ohju battalion or else the people of Kazalm will be sentenced to death, as well as Erin's best friend, Yuuyan.
45	"Caged Bird"; Transliteration: "Kago no Tori" (Japanese: かごの鳥)	Shinsuke Terasawa; Kazunobu Fuseki	Kiyoko Yoshimura	November 21, 2009
Back at the Royal Palace, Kahil tells Ia-lu that Dahmiyah was to wed Shin-Oh Seimiyah. He also hears that the old Seh-Zan were to be dismissed and new Seh-zan were to be introduced to the palace. Ia-lu is strongly against it, and decides to confront Dahmiyah. While there, Ia-lu learns that Dahmiyah was working with the Psi-Gamul and planned the attack on the boat. He also learns that Dahmiyah was blackmailing Erin to create an Ohju Army for the war. Meanwhile, Kahil was being ambushed by the Psi-Gamul, one of whom was Kirik. Ia-lu manages to get there in time and save Kahil. As Ia-lu confronts the unmasked Kirik, he helps him realize the mistake in his current actions.
46	"The Bond Between the Two"; Transliteration: "Futari no Kizuna" (Japanese: ふたりの絆（きずな）)	Takashi Andō; Kazunobu Fuseki	Reiko Yoshida	November 28, 2009
After being poisoned by Dahmiyah and injured by the Psi-Gamul, Ia-lu seeks refuge at Lazal with Erin. While there, Erin tends to his wounds while he tells her about Dahmiyah working with the Psi-Gamul to kill the late Shin-Oh. Kirik is sent by Dahmiyah to make sure Ia-lu was dead, but Kirik decides not to after seeing him with Erin. Dahmiyah learns of this, and decides to locate Ia-lu and kill him himself. When he arrives at Eku and Lilan's shed, he doesn't find Ia-lu and leaves. It is later revealed that Erin had Ia-lu hide under Lilan. For the rest of the night, Erin and Ia-lu talk. From there, they decide that they will reveal everything to the Shin-Oh Seimiyah together.
47	"A Pure Night"; Transliteration: "Kiyoraka na Yoru" (Japanese: 清らかな夜)	Akihiro Saitō; Kazunobu Fuseki	Daishirō Tanimura	December 5, 2009
While at the Forest of Purification, Seimiyah is confronted by a large Ohju in the mist. Seimiyah meets Erin and learns of the First Shin-Oh Je and the incident of Ophalon. Erin also explains that Damiyah was forcing Erin to create an Ohju battalion for the war and attempted to kill the "traitor" Ia-lu with poison to prevent the truth from getting to Seimiyah. After listening to what seemed to be lies, Seimiyah comes to terms with the truth and decides what to do next: Seimiyah will grant Erin her freedom, only if Erin would accompany her when they go to meet the Tai-Koh at Tahai-Azeh.
48	"Dawn of Tahai-Azeh"; Transliteration: "Ryoza no Yoake" (Japanese: リョザの夜明け)	Kazunobu Fuseki	Sayaka Harada	December 12, 2009
The day of the meeting of the Shin-Oh and the Tai-Koh comes, deciding whether there will be a war or not. Kirik is heavily injured by pursuers sent by Dahmiyah, and takes refuge with Erin. When Kirik decides to leave, he tells Erin of his sister Taya and to live happily. While the ceremony for the meeting of Tahai-Azeh is being performed to Dahmiyah and Seimiyah, Kirik and Ia-lu meet in the mountains to fight. Their fight is interrupted by Psi-Gamul sent by Dahmiyah, and the two decide to team up to fight. They win, however, Kirik is too injured to go on, and asks Ia-lu to go and help Erin by disguising himself as a Psi-Gamul soldier.
49	"Final Battle"; Transliteration: "Kessen" (Japanese: 決戦)	Kenichi Matsuzawa; Kazunobu Fuseki	Junichi Fujisaku	December 19, 2009
The Tai-Koh's Touda troop advances toward the Shin-Oh, but Seimiyah refuses to go to war with Shunan. As she orders her maids to put up the blue flag to surrender, Dahmiyah shows his true colors and reveals to Seimiyah that he killed Shin-Oh Harumiyah and that all the Seh-Zan were working for Dahmiyah. Erin tries to save Seimiyah, but is stopped by a Psi-Gamul soldier. Ia-lu reveals himself out of his Psi-Gamul disguise and saves Erin. Seimiyah orders Erin to raise the blue flag, and the Tai-Koh's troops see it and cheer for their win. As Ia-lu detains Dahmiyah, Dahmiyah reveals that there was a secret Touda army working under him and the Tai-Koh's son Nugan was leading it. The Dahmiyah Touda army attacks the Tai-Koh's troops, and everyone watches in horror of the bloody slaughter. Semiyah notices Shunan who was in the fight, and fears for his life. Erin tells Seimiyah that she will fly Lilan into the battlefield to save Shunan and destroy Dahmiyah's Touda once and for all.
50	"Beast Player"; Transliteration: "Kemono No Souja" (Japanese: 獣の奏者)	Takayuki Hamana; Kazunobu Fuseki	Junichi Fujisaku	December 26, 2009
Erin flies Lilan into the battlefield and successfully destroys the Touda army Dahmiyah made. She manages to have Lilan stop attacking the Touda and has Shunan ride Lilan to escape. However, all does not end well, as Erin is suddenly attacked by a barrage of arrows. As Lilan flies under Erin's orders, Erin lays in the sea of arrows. Shunan gets to where Seimiyah is, but is worried for his life's savior, as the Touda who were forced unconscious reawaken and go after Erin. As Seimiyah cries for someone to save Erin, Lilan hears this and decides to go back. Lilan saves Erin from the Touda by safely grabbing her in her mouth. This surprises Erin, who once feared Lilan's fangs. Lilan flies through the sky, shining silver, and everyone watches in awe. As Seimiyah and Shunan agree to join their countries through marriage, Dahmiyah breaks free from Ia-lu's grip and grabs Erin's knife. He lunges it at Seimiyah and Shunan, only to be killed by Ia-lu. Years later, the crowning of King Shunan and Shin-Oh Seimiyah has been done, and the once segregated countries are now ruled under a single leadership. Kirik, who was thought to be dead, is revealed to be alive and is now a traveling doctor who treats patients of both countries. Everyone at the Kazalm Ohju Breeding School has grown. Nuk and Mok stay as the school's head handymen who help Karisa. Erin's friends, Kashugan and Yuuyan, are married and have 3 kids. Erin is now a Master at Kazalm and is married to former Seh-Zan and current harp carpenter Ia-lu. Together, they have a son named Jeshi, who attends Kazalm and is caring for Eku and Lilan's child Aru. He now wears his grandmother's bracelet and plays his parents' harp. Reminiscing in her memories, Erin doesn't regret a single event that happened to her on the path of the Beast Healer. Now, as a mother herself, Erin promises to teach her child of the true ways of the Beast Player.

== DVD volumes ==
Japanese distributor Aniplex was scheduled to release twelve compilation DVDs between 2009 and 2010. In addition, a box set of the first 30 episodes was scheduled to be released on March 14, 2010.

Aniplex DVD releases
Volume	Released	Discs	Episodes	Volume	Released	Discs	Episodes
1	August 8, 2009	1	4	7	February 3, 2010	1	5
2	September 2, 2009	1	4	8	March 3, 2010	1	4
3	October 7, 2009	1	5	9	April 4, 2010	1	4
4	November 4, 2009	1	4	10	May 12, 2010	1	4
5	December 2, 2009	1	4	11	June 2, 2010	1	4
6	January 6, 2010	1	4	12	July 7, 2010	1	4
