= Makiko Futaki =

Japanese animator

- 二木真希子
- Born: June 19, 1958; Aichi, Japan
- Died: May 13, 2016 (aged 57); Koganei, Tokyo, Japan
- Occupations: Author; animator; Illustrator
- Years active: 1979–2014
- Employer: Studio Ghibli (1981–2016)

Makiko Futaki (二木真希子 Futaki Makiko; June 19, 1958 – May 13, 2016) was a Japanese animator best known for her contributions to Studio Ghibli on films such as My Neighbor Totoro (1988), Princess Mononoke (1997), and Spirited Away (2001). She is also known for her role as a key animator on the cult classic film, Akira (1988), and her early work with studio Gainax on Royal Space Force: The Wings of Honnêamise (1987). Hayao Miyazaki, the founder of Studio Ghibli, praised her talents as an artist calling her both a valuable asset and someone he can trust to execute his vision. She died on May 13, 2016, due to an unpublished illness at a Tokyo hospital.

== Career ==
In college, Futaki began to gain recognition as an animator for the cine-calligraphy style films she presented at the amateur PAF Animation Festival. Cine-calligraphy is a technique initially developed by Norman McLaren, which involved scratching images directly onto the film stock. In the case of Futaki, this was done by drawing on 8-millimeter film. Despite her young age, this demonstrated great artistic vision and talent as an animator.

She began with a minor role doing in-between animation on Hayao Miyazaki's directorial debut film, Lupin the III: The Castle of Cagliostro, in 1979. However, it was not until she met Isao Takahata, co-founder of Studio Ghibli, and impressed him with her work on Jarinko Chie that she would be recruited by the studio in 1981. She continued by doing partial work on most of the first few Studio Ghibli movies while still working on other feature projects with different studios. Her work as a key animator on Akira, which received critical acclaim both nationally and internationally, is what prompted Miyazaki to adopt her as a full-time staff member. She had worked on every single Ghibli film since 1998 with her final contribution being on 2014's When Marnie Was There.

== Artistic style and influences ==
Futaki expressed a particular interest in nature as well as an empathy for animals, and this has been reflected in her animation style. As a key animator, she was tasked with creating detailed frames of climactic moments for in-between animators to use later as a basis to structure the scene. This also included drawing facial expressions and choreographing complex action scenes. She was responsible for animating scenes, such as the meeting between Mei and Totoro in My Neighbor Totoro, the rooftop meeting between Pazu and Sheeta in Castle in the Sky, and the opening scene in Kiki's Delivery Service. While she specialized in, and excelled at drawing scenes of natural harmony with Ghibli, she also showed adaptability in her style notably with her role in creating the Cyberpunk world of Akira.

Despite her talents, there have also been various barriers that kept Futaki from working extensively within the animation industry. Some of this can be attributed to the traditional expectations of women in Japan and how this limits the opportunities offered to them in this medium. Additionally, Futaki's particularly time-consuming and detailed approach to drawing frames, as well as her niche drawing specialty, has excluded her from the faster-paced animation industry. According to Miyazaki, "Unfortunately there are not many avenues for Futaki-san to express her talent in Japan's present animation world. Depiction of plants are easy to avoid. Also, the piecework payment structure that is set at so much per second makes it difficult for her to be fairly compensated for her efforts."

== Work outside of film ==
Miyazaki stated that he is normally opposed to having his animators take on side projects while working on a film. However, he also noted that he makes an exception with Futaki. He actively encouraged her to pursue different mediums. He further stated that "this is because I don't think her sweeping and deep interest in the world and in living beings can be expressed truly through animation." Despite this encouragement, Futaki has kept her work outside of the animation medium to a minimum.

The Tree in the Middle of the World (1989)

A children's book written and illustrated exclusively by Futaki and inspired by her trip to Yakushima when she was doing research for My Neighbor Totoro. It follows the story of a young girl named Cici and her quest to climb the great tree. This book took over a year to complete because of her commitments to other films and has yet to be released outside of Japan, except for an Italian edition released at the end of 2020.

Moribito series (1996–2012)

Futaki was one of three artists, along with Miho Satake and Yuko Shimizu, that provided illustrations for Moribito, a fantasy novel series by Japanese author Nahoko Uehashi. The series follows Balsa, a bodyguard for hire, who saves a young boy from the river and has her destiny intertwine with his. The series has received praise for its mix of both Western modes of storytelling and Japanese history.

== Filmography ==
Films
Year	Title	Contribution	Studio
1979	Lupin the III: The Castle of Cagliostro	In-Between Animation	Tokyo Movie Shinsha
1981	Jarinko Chie	In-Between Animation	Tokyo Movie Shinsha & Toho
1982	Space Adventure Cobra: The Movie	Key animation	Toho
1984	Sherlock Hound: The Adventure of the Blue Carbuncle	Key animation	Tokyo Movie Shinsha
1984	Nausicaä of the Valley of the Wind	Key Animation (uncredited)	Top Craft
1985	Angel's Egg	Key Animation	Tokuma Shoten & Studio Deen
1985	Night on the Galactic Railroad	Key animation	Group TAC & Nippon Herald
1986	Castle in the Sky	Key animation	Studio Ghibli
1987	Royal Space Force: The Wings of Honnêamise	Key animation	Gainax
1988	Akira	Key animation	Tokyo Movie Shinsha (TMS Entertainment) & Akira Committee Company Ltd.
1988	My Neighbor Totoro	Key animation	Studio Ghibli
1989	Kiki's Delivery Service	Key animation	Studio Ghibli
1991	Only Yesterday	Key animation	Studio Ghibli
1992	Porco Rosso	Key animation	Studio Ghibli
1994	Pom Poko	Key animation	Studio Ghibli
1995	Whisper of the Heart	Key animation	Studio Ghibli
1997	Princess Mononoke	Key animation	Studio Ghibli
1999	My Neighbors the Yamadas	Key animation	Studio Ghibli
2001	Spirited Away	Key animation	Studio Ghibli
2004	Howl's Moving Castle	Key animation	Studio Ghibli
2006	Tales from Earthsea	Assistant Animation Director	Studio Ghibli
2008	Ponyo	Key animation	Studio Ghibli
2011	From Up on Poppy Hill	Key animation	Studio Ghibli
2012	The Secret World of Arrietty	Key Animation	Studio Ghibli
2013	The Wind Rises	Key animation	Studio Ghibli
2014	When Marnie Was There	Key Animation	Studio Ghibli

TV series, OVAs, and ONAs
Year	Title	Contribution	Notes	Studio
1979	Lupin the Third Part II	In-Between Animations	Episode 153	Tokyo Movie Shinsha
1984	Sherlock Hound	Key animation	episodes 5, 10–11	Tokyo Movie Shinsha
1987	Devilman: The Birth (OAV)	Key animation	Episode 1	King Records
1987	Twilight Q (OAV)	Key animation	Episode 2	Studio Deen
1989	Gosenzo-sama Banbanzai! (OAV)	Key animation	episode 6	Studio Pierrot
1991	The Trapp Family Story	Key animation	Episode 24	Nippon Animation
2003	Mei and the Kittenbus	Animation Director	Short film shown exclusively at the Studio Ghibli Museum	Studio Ghibli
2006	Mon Mon the Water Spider	Key animation	Short film shown exclusively at the Studio Ghibli Museum	Studio Ghibli
