= The Cat Man of Aleppo =

2020 picture book

- Author: Karim Shamsi-Basha; Irene Latham
- Illustrator: Yuko Shimizu
- Publisher: G. P. Putnam's Sons
- Awards: Caldecott Honor
- ISBN: 9781984813787
- OCLC: 1341874144

The Cat Man of Aleppo is a 2020 picture book written by Karim Shamsi-Basha and Irene Latham and illustrated by Yuko Shimizu. The book won a 2021 Caldecott Honor. The book is based on the true story of Mohammad Alaa Aljaleel, an ambulance driver in the city of Aleppo during the Syrian Civil War, and his efforts to care for the city's cat population. There are notes in the book written by the real Mohammad Alaa Aljaleel.

The book also won a 2020 Middle East Book Award.
