= The Unwritten =

Comic

- Cover to The Unwritten #1 by Yuko Shimizu

Publication information
- Publisher: Vertigo
- Schedule: Monthly
- Genre: Contemporary fantasy
- Publication date: October 2009 – January 2015
- No. of issues: 71 (#1–54, #31.5–35.5, Apocalypse #1–12)
- Main character: Tom Taylor

Creative team
- Written by: Mike Carey
- Artist(s): Peter Gross; Yuko Shimizu (covers)
- Letterer: Todd Klein
- Colorist(s): Chris Chuckry; Jeanne McGee
- Editor: Pornsak Pichetshote

Collected editions
- Volume 1: ISBN 1-4012-2565-9
- Volume 2: ISBN 1-4012-2873-9
- Volume 3: ISBN 1-4012-3046-6
- Volume 4: ISBN 1-4012-3292-2
- Volume 5: ISBN 1-7811-6050-3
- Volume 6: ISBN 1-4012-3560-3
- Volume 7: ISBN 1-4012-3806-8
- Volume 8: ISBN 1-4012-4301-0
- Volume 9: ISBN 1-4012-4694-X
- Volume 10: ISBN 1-4012-5055-6
- Volume 11: ISBN 1-4012-5348-2

The Unwritten is an American comic book written by Mike Carey with art by Peter Gross. Published by the Vertigo imprint of DC Comics, the book follows Tom Taylor, who was the inspiration for a series of hugely successful children's fantasy novels. The series deals with themes related to fame, celebrity, and the relationship between fiction and human consciousness.

== Inspiration ==
Mike Carey, in an interview with Nicholas Yanes from scifipulse.net, claimed that "the most important reference point is the autobiography of Christopher Milne – who is famous as the Christopher Robin of the Winnie the Pooh books. Milne grew up feeling that his father had stolen his childhood from him, turned a profit from it and then given it back to him in a form he couldn't use. Our Tom is very much in that situation when we first meet him, although we take his identity crisis a fair bit further than that".

== Collected editions ==
The series is collected into trade paperbacks:

The Unwritten trade paperbacks
Title	ISBN	Release date	Collected material
Volume 1: Tommy Taylor and the Bogus Identity	ISBN 1-4012-2565-9	January 12, 2010	The Unwritten #1–5 – 144 pages
Volume 2: Inside Man	ISBN 1-4012-2873-9	August 11, 2010	The Unwritten #6–12 – 168 pages
Volume 3: Dead Man's Knock	ISBN 1-4012-3046-6	March 29, 2011	The Unwritten #13–18 – 160 pages
Volume 4: Leviathan	ISBN 1-4012-3292-2	October 25, 2011	The Unwritten #19–24 – 144 pages
Volume 5: On to Genesis	ISBN 1-78116-050-3	January 27, 2012	The Unwritten #25–30 – 160 pages
Volume 6: Tommy Taylor and the War of Words	ISBN 1-4012-3560-3	October 17, 2012	The Unwritten #31–35.5 – 240 pages
Volume 7: The Wound	ISBN 1-4012-3806-8	March 26, 2013	The Unwritten #36–41 – 144 pages
Volume 8: Orpheus in the Underworlds	ISBN 1-4012-4301-0	February 4, 2014	The Unwritten #42–49 – 176 pages
Volume 9: The Unwritten Fables	ISBN 1-4012-4694-X	July 29, 2014	The Unwritten #50–54, crossover with Fables – 144 pages
Volume 10: War Stories	ISBN 1-4012-5055-6	October 14, 2014	The Unwritten: Apocalypse #1–5 – 128 pages
Volume 11: Apocalypse	ISBN 1-4012-5348-2	May 25, 2015	The Unwritten: Apocalypse #6–12 – 176 pages

Additionally, Vertigo released in September 2013 an original graphic novel called The Unwritten: Tommy Taylor and the Ship that Sank Twice (hardcover, ISBN 1-4012-2976-X), a standalone story about the origin of Tommy Taylor and his powers.

The story of Tommy Taylor continues in the 12 issue series (also titled Volume 2) of The Unwritten: Apocalypse, started in January 2014 (compiled in collected Volumes 10 and 11).

The Unwritten was partially released in deluxe hardcover editions. Compendium One was released in 2023 collecting half the series. Compendium Two was released in September 2026.

The Unwritten Deluxe & Compendium Editions
#	Title	ISBN	Release date	Collected material
1	The Unwritten: The Deluxe Edition Book One	ISBN 1-4012-6543-X	December 14, 2016	#1–12
2	The Unwritten: The Deluxe Edition Book Two	ISBN 1-4012-7506-0	December 27, 2017	#13–24
1	The Unwritten: Compendium One	ISBN 978-1779521750	June 20, 2023	#1-30 & The Unwritten: Tommy Taylor and the Ship that Sank Twice
2	The Unwritten: Compendium Two	ISBN 978-1799509158	September 15, 2026	#31, #31.5, #32, #32.5, #33, #33.5, #34, #34.5, #35, #35.5, #36-54, and The Unwritten: Apocalypse #1-12

== Reception ==
IGN gave the first three issues 8.5, 9.0 and 9.0 out of 10, respectively.
