= Moribito series =

Series of Japanese fantasy novels

Moribito
- Cover of the Japanese edition of Moribito: Guardian of the Spirit, the first in the series
- Author: Nahoko Uehashi
- Translator: Cathy Hirano
- Illustrator: Makiko Futaki; Miho Satake; Yuko Shimizu
- Country: Japan
- Language: Japanese
- Genre: Fantasy series
- Publisher: (Japan) Kaiseisha (hardcover, 1996–2012), Shinchosha (bunkobon, 2003–2007) (United States) Scholastic Corporation (hardcover and paperback, 2008–2009)
- Media type: Print (hardcover, paperback and bunkobon)

The Moribito series (Japanese: 守り人シリーズ, Hepburn: Moribito shirīzu; lit. 'Guardian series') is a Japanese fantasy novel series written by Nahoko Uehashi. The first novel in the series, Moribito: Guardian of the Spirit, has been adapted into numerous media, including a radio drama, manga series, an anime adaption, and a live-action series.

As of 2018, the series is composed of 10 parts, published in 13 volumes. The series has been translated into several languages. In English, Scholastic released the first two novels in 2008 and 2009 respectively.

== Setting ==
Moribito is set in a fantasy analog of historical Asia. The setting includes several nations, such as Kanbal, a rugged, Himalayan-like kingdom, and New Yogo, a fertile kingdom that combines elements of feudal Japan and Southwest China. The supernatural plays very prominently into the world of the series, with the physical world being referred to as Sagu and a parallel spirit world being referred to as Nayug.

== Characters ==
=== Protagonists ===
Balsa (バルサ, Barusa)
Voiced by: Jun Karasawa (radio), Mabuki Andou (anime) (Japanese); Cindy Robinson (English)
Played by: Haruka Ayase
A skilled warrior from the faraway land of Kanbal. She is 30 years old. Balsa claims to be a simple bodyguard-for-hire; in reality, she wields her spear in order to save lives in atonement for the eight lives that were taken to protect her when she was a child. Balsa is pragmatic and intelligent and she does not hold much regard for class distinction customs. Despite her deadly skill with a spear, Balsa tries not to kill in combat. As a result, her body is covered with scars. At one point it is revealed that she is the daughter of the former Kanbal King's physician who had discovered that the new King had poisoned his predecessor. Worried that his crime would be revealed, the new King ordered the physician and his daughter, Balsa, executed for treason. To protect his daughter, the physician asked the one warrior he could trust, Jiguro, who was the first of the King's 9 Spears, to take her and run while he stayed behind. Unfortunately, the King sent the other 8 Spears (while holding their families hostage) after them. Her guardian was able to protect her but had to kill all 8 of his former comrades to do so. Later he taught Balsa how to use a spear responsibly after seeing her perfectly re-enact the moves she'd seen him use. During their journey, Balsa becomes attached to Chagum and even teaches him some important lessons in life. At the end of the series, she is seen returning to Kanbal for reasons unspecified but is hinted to be putting Jiguro's soul to rest.

Chagum (チャグム, Chagumu)
Voiced by: Shōtarō Ōkubo (radio), Naoto Adachi (anime) (Japanese); Mona Marshall (English)
Played by: Kai Kobayashi (season 1), Mizuki Itagaki (season 2–3)
The second prince of the New Yogo Imperial Family. He bears the egg of the water spirit, making him the "guardian of the spirit". At first, it is believed to be the reincarnation of the legendary water demon defeated by his ancestor, the first Mikado. Convinced that it would bring misfortune and destruction to the country, Chagum's father secretly orders his death. However, before they can assassinate him, his mother, the Second Queen, hires Balsa to hide and protect him. Later, it was revealed that the egg is a water-bestowing spirit that revives the land once every hundred years upon successfully hatching. The real demon that his ancestors defeated was a creature that seeks to consume the egg before it can hatch resulting in the land suffering an extreme drought for a long time. By accepting the job to protect him, Chagum becomes the eighth and final soul Balsa vows to save to complete her atonement. During their journey together, he becomes emotionally attached to Balsa. At the end of the series, he is appointed the crown prince and hailed as a hero for helping the spirit be born. He bids a tearful farewell to Balsa, Tanda, and Madam Torogai as they leave the palace, thanking them for everything they did for him.

Tanda (タンダ, Tanda)
Voiced by: Kenzo (radio), Kōji Tsujitani (anime) (Japanese); Peter Doyle (English)
Played by: Masahiro Higashide
An herbalist who lives in the mountains. His skill as a shaman are lacking, but he is an accomplished doctor as he would always tend to Balsa's injuries suffered in battle as they grew up together. He also works as a traveling medicine man, trading his wares with the local towns and cities. Tanda has also had a long-standing crush on Balsa that seems to have dated several years before the start of the main story. Balsa acknowledges his feelings for her and in fact feels the same way about him as he does for her, but the two never act on their feelings during the series. At the end of the series, Tanda is seen having dinner with Saya and Tōya, telling them that he will gladly wait for Balsa to return from Kanbal.

Torogai (トロガイ, Torogai)
Voiced by: Misako Watanabe (radio), Ako Mayama (anime) (Japanese); Barbara Goodson (English)
Played by: Reiko Takashima
An old shaman and Tanda's teacher, who proves to be incredibly competent at taking care of herself. A master of the old ways, she is in-tune with the spirit world, Nayug. It is this relationship that allowed her to discover the spirit's true identity. She is capable of communicating with denizens of the spirit realm. She carries a little rabbit-type familiar that travels in her shamaness hat. She is eccentric and unfailingly blunt but never fails to tell the truth.

=== Kingdom of New Yogo ===
==== Royal family ====
The Mikado (帝, Mikado)
Voiced by: Atsushi Ono (Japanese); Chris Kent (English)
Played by: Tatsuya Fujiwara
Due to the belief that Chagum was possessed and that the possession was the reason for the Drought Sign being seen, he ordered Chagum to be killed. The Mikado is the only one able to kill Chagum due to the legend that was how his ancestor ascended the throne by killing an evil water spirit and the belief that only the Mikado could successfully kill it.

The First Queen (一ノ妃, Ichi no Kisaki)
Voiced by: Sayuri (Japanese); Barbara Goodson (English)
Played by: Kae Okumura
The mother of Sagum.

The Second Queen (二ノ妃, Ni no Kisaki)
Voiced by: Emi Shinohara (Japanese); Tara Platt (English)
Played by: Fumino Kimura
Mother to Chagum, she was the one who requested Balsa to become Chagum's bodyguard. While he is on the run she is held under 'house arrest' for helping him escape.

Sagum (サグム, Sagumu)
Voiced by: Ryouya Kobayashi (Japanese); Johnny Yong Bosch (English)
Played by: Kaisei Nakano
Chagum's older brother and the heir to the throne, who cares deeply for Chagum. When Chagum's belongings were ordered burned after Chagum was presumed dead, Sagum took over the task to protect Chagum's things. He dies from overwork in his responsibilities as Crown Prince before being able to see Chagum alive again. In the book, there was no mention of him being close to Chagum, and he dies of illness.

==== Star readers ====
Shuga (シュガ, Shuga)
Voiced by: Hirofumi Nojima (Japanese); Steve Staley (English)
Played by: Kento Hayashi
The youngest master star reader in history and Chagum's tutor. He is among the only three people aware of the hunters that serve in the Mikado's shadow. He investigates the real cause of the drought sign and Chagum's supposed death in secret. When he was growing up he had lived in a fishing village, as a result, he is skilled in riding a horse.

Gakai (ガカイ, Gakai)
Voiced by: Hiroshi Naka (Japanese); Doug Stone (English)
Played by: Mitsuru Fukikoshi
A star reader and Prince Sagum's tutor. He is stubbornly dismissive of the events that have been occurring since rumors emerged that Prince Chagum was possessed by a water demon. However, Shuga respects Gakai as a scholar and sincerely requests his help to decipher the tablets in the Star Chamber in order to save Prince Chagum after Sagum's untimely death. At the end of the series, he thanks Prince Sagum for guiding him in helping to save Chagum's life.

Hibi Tonan (ヒビ・トナン, Hibi Tonan)
Voiced by: Takkō Ishimori (Japanese); Steve Kramer (English)
The chief master star reader, later entrusted by Shuga with the responsibility of organizing the translations of the Secret Tome. He is dismissive of the knowledge of shamans and looks down at the possible advantage of consulting them for advice. While he does not believe that Prince Chagum should be killed, he does believe that the water spirit in the child is dangerous and must be dealt with.

==== The Hunters ====
Mon (モン, Mon)
Voiced by: Naomi Kusumi (Japanese); Jamieson Price (English)
One of the initial pursuers sent to retrieve Chagum after Balsa leaves with him. He is the head of the hunters, and he respects Balsa as an opponent, particularly when he realizes that she has elected not to kill any of her enemies in spite of the advantage it will offer her in order to protect Chagum. During the penultimate episode, Mon and the other Hunters acknowledge Balsa as a hero and proudly stand beside her in battle.

Jin (ジン, Jin)
Voiced by: Masaya Matsukaze (Japanese); Jason C. Miller (English)
Played by: Satoshi Matsuda
One of the initial pursuers sent to retrieve Chagum after Balsa leaves with him. After securing the prince, Jin attempts to kill him so that Chagum need not die by his own father's hands; knowing though that this act of insubordination would mean Jin's own death. He deems it a favor in return for the kindness that the prince showed him earlier in his life. He uses blowdarts as his weapon.

Zen (ゼン, Zen)
Voiced by: Kenichi Mochizuki (Japanese); Michael McConnohie (English)
One of the initial pursuers sent to retrieve Chagum after Balsa leaves with him. He survives the encounter due to Balsa's vow never to take a human life and takes on the identity of the "Chief", a client who quickly wins the trust of Tōya so that Shuga and the hunters can track down Chagum and Balsa.

Yun (ユン, Yun)
Voiced by: Shinji Kawada (Japanese); Christopher Smith (English)
One of the initial pursuers sent to retrieve Chagum after Balsa leaves with him, which apparently left him with a scar on his nose. He also appears to have a superb photographic memory, as he was able to skim through one of Tōya's order record books and completely memorized the contents.

Hyoku (ヒョク, Hyoku)*
Voiced by: Takayuki Sasada
One of the warriors who wields dual broadswords, but he was defeated by Madam Torogai.

Rai (ライ, Rai)*
Voiced by: Atsushi Ono
One of the warriors who uses a chain and sickle weapon, but he was also defeated by Madam Torogai.

Taga (タガ, Taga)*
Voiced by: Kouhei Fukuhara (Japanese); Steve Kramer (English)
A hunter who is very skilled in archery.

Sune (スン, Sune)
Voiced by: Yuki Masuda (Japanese); Kyle Hebert (English)
Another hunter who is very skilled in archery.

==== Kōsenkyō Downtown ====
Tōya (トーヤ, Tōya)
Voiced by: Mayumi Asano (Japanese); Yuri Lowenthal (English)
Played by: Seishiro Kato
An orphan boy and friend of Balsa, whom he regards as his elder sister. It is later discovered that he and Saya were saved by Balsa, and that is how they became acquainted. This may be the reason why Tōya claims that he would go "through fire and water for Balsa". He is very clever for his age, often haggling with merchants to lower their prices and is always successful in doing so. He teaches Chagum how to barter with merchants as well the basics of gambling.

Saya (サヤ, Saya)
Voiced by: Ryō Hirohashi (Japanese); Erika Lenhart (English)
Played by: Riana Saijima
An orphan girl who is a friend of Balsa. Due to Balsa staying at their hut, she and Tōya have to leave the city and end up following Balsa because they would be troubled if the pursuers were to find them again. It is later found out that she has a crush on Tōya.

The Blue Hand (青い手, Aoi Te)
Voiced by: Taiten Kusunoki (Japanese); Tony Oliver (English)
A slave trader acquainted with Balsa due to her guarding VIPs who did various things that hurt the slavery business. Balsa uses the money she got from the Second Queen to buy and free a bunch of slaves from him. This allows her to not only free the slaves but by journeying home the former slaves create a lot of false leads for the Mikado's men to waste time and attention running them down and away from Balsa and the prince.

The Swordsmith (鍛冶屋, Kajiya)*
Voiced by: Katsunosuke Hori (Japanese); Michael Forest (English)
A highly skilled smith who forges swords for guards of the imperial court. He was the smith that created Jiguro's spear that Balsa inherited. While reluctant to repair her spear allowing her to fight and kill, he does so after finding out from Mon and Jin that when she had overwhelmed them in an earlier battle, she did so without killing anyone deliberately even though it would have been faster and easier for her to do so.

=== Kingdom of Kanbal ===
==== Royal family ====
Radalle (ラダール, Radāru)
Son of the deceased Rogsam; the King of Kanbal.

==== Ten Clans ====
===== Musa Clan =====
Jiguro Musa (ジグロ・ムサ, Jiguro Musa)
Voiced by: Yoshi Sakō (radio), Rintarō Nishi (anime) (Japanese); Kyle Hebert (English)
Played by: Kōji Kikkawa
Balsa's mentor, caretaker, and bodyguard. Originally the leader and strongest member of the king of Kanbal's 'Nine Spears'; he 'betrayed' his country to save Balsa's life. After fleeing Kanbal, they were pursued by the other eight 'Spears'. In a series of pitched battles, Jiguro was forced to kill the men he considered his best friends. He also trained Balsa to wield a spear honorably and with wisdom, and she later inherited his spear after he died. When Balsa's father asked Jiguro to protect her, he at first refused, but later appeared to save Balsa from two of the King’s assassins. Balsa believes that Jiguro helped her because he could not live with the guilt of not helping his friend, as he believed that not helping someone when you are in a position to do so is the equivalent of harming them yourself.

Kassa (カッサ, Kassa)
Son of Tonno and Leena, brother of Gina. Part of the Musa Clan.

Gina (ジナ, Jina)
Sister of Kassa; saved by Balsa at the beginning of Moribito II: Guardian of the Darkness.

Yuguro Musa (ユグロ・ムサ, Yuguro Musa)
Younger brother of Jiguro Musa; a hero and the most respected of the King's Spears.

Kaguro Musa (カグロ・ムサ, Kaguro Musa)
Elder brother of Jiguro and Yuguro, uncle of Kassa and Gina. Chief of the Musa Clan.

==== Herder people ====
Toto (トト, Toto)
Known as Toto the Elder; oldest of all the herder people.

== Publication history ==
The novel series was published in hardback by Kaiseisha as children's literature, though the series has garnered many adult fans. Shinchosha began its publication in of the series in bunko size in March 2007. The Moribito and Tabibito strands of the series split after the first book, Guardian of the Spirit, and merge again in the chronologically final book, Ten to Chi no Moribito.

Book	Kanji title	Romaji title	Original title, literal translation	Notes
Book	Publication date	ISBN	English publication title	Notes
Book	Summary			Notes
1	精霊の守り人	Seirei no Moribito	Guardian of the Spirit	1 volume
1	July 1996; March 2007 (bunko)	ISBN 978-4-03-540150-6; ISBN 978-4-10-130272-0 (bunko)	Moribito: Guardian of the Spirit	1 volume
1	When Balsa saves Prince Chagum of the kingdom of New Yogo, a boy with a mysterious spirit living inside him, she is hired to protect him from the assassins his father has sent after him and the dangers the spirit inside him brings.			1 volume
2	闇の守り人	Yami no Moribito	Guardian of the Darkness	1 volume
2	January 1999; June 2007 (bunko)	ISBN 978-4-03-540210-7; ISBN 978-4-10-130273-7 (bunko)	Moribito II: Guardian of the Darkness	1 volume
2	Balsa returns to the country where she was born to face her tragic past, but the consequences of that past and the secret that lies buried under the mountains make her task a difficult one.			1 volume
3	夢の守り人	Yume no Moribito	Guardian of Dreams	1 volume
3	May 2000; December 2007 (bunko)	ISBN 978-4-03-540230-5		1 volume
3	People start becoming trapped in their dreams. Tanda's niece, Chagum, and the First Queen all dream of a flower with ties to Torogai's past. Only a man with a supernatural singing voice can save them.			1 volume
4	虚空の旅人	Kokū no Tabibito	Traveler of the Void	1 volume
4	July 2001	ISBN 978-4-03-540270-1		1 volume
4	Chagum, now the crown prince of New Yogo, and Shuga are sent bearing greetings to a southern country, Sangal, for the new king's coronation ceremony. However, a black shadow is reaching towards Sangal and the would-be-king of Sangal is fatally wounded.			1 volume
5	神の守り人	Kami no Moribito	Guardian of the God	2 volumes
5	January 2003 (both volumes)	ISBN 978-4-03-540280-0 (The Book of Coming (来訪編, Raihō-hen)); ISBN 978-4-03-540290-9 (The Book of Returning (帰還編, Kikan-hen))		2 volumes
5	When Balsa encounters a brother and sister being sold by a slave trader, she impulsively takes the girl, Asla, away when she notices the girl has a strange aura. However, Balsa comes to wonder if the girl is a divinely appointed guardian or a child of disaster as a dark secret of the child begins to emerge. As Asla grows fearful of her power, she draws closer to an awful god while her powers are felt in the Kingdom of Lota, now divided in a civil war between the north and south. Balsa must protect Asla from the forces that threaten the girl while eluding Shihana, an undercover agent from Lota who pursues them.			2 volumes
6	蒼路の旅人	Sōro no Tabibito	Traveler of the Indigo Road	1 volume
6	April 2005	ISBN 978-4-03-540310-4		1 volume
6	Following the events of Kokū no Tabibito, Sangal is being engulfed by forces from Talsh, which now draws nearer to New Yogo. In order to protect his country, Chagum must make a perilous journey alone.			1 volume
7	天と地の守り人	Ten to Chi no Moribito	Guardian of Heaven and Earth	3 volumes
7	January 2007 (volume 1); January 2007 (volume 2); February 2007 (volume 3)	ISBN 978-4-03-540320-3 (The Kingdom of Lota (ロタ王国編, Lota Ōkoku-hen)); ISBN 978-4-03-540330-2 (The Kingdom of Kanbal (カンバル王国編, Kanbaru Ōkoku-hen)); ISBN 978-4-03-540340-1 (The Kingdom of Yogo (新ヨゴ皇国編, Shin Yogo Ōkoku-hen))		3 volumes
7	Balsa sets off for the kingdom of Lota to rescue Chagum, the Crown Prince of New Yogo, hitherto believed dead. To protect his homeland from ruin, they undertake a dangerous quest to reach the king of Kanbal to forge an alliance between Lota and Kanbal to end the influence of the neighboring nation of Talsh, which threatens New Yogo. With Balsa's help, Chagum returns to his homeland after a Talsh attack takes many civilian lives. While Chagum leads New Yogo against the Mikado, Balsa finds her old friend Tanda injured by the war.			3 volumes
8	流れ行く者	Nagare Yuku Mono	Wanderers	1 volume
8	April 2008	ISBN 978-4-03-540360-9		1 volume
8	A collection of prequel stories to the series: "Uki Momi" (浮き籾), "Rafura" (ラフラ), "Nagare Yuku Mono" (流れ行く者), and "Kan no Furumai" (寒のふるまい). Tanda, a sensitive eleven-year-old boy, adores Balsa, who is drifting about with her "father", fleeing from a plot against them. They try to find out about a curse in the village and discover the painful secret of a dead wastrel.			1 volume
9	炎路を行く者	Enro o Yuku Mono	Treading the Path of Fire	1 volume
9	January 2012	ISBN 978-4-03-540380-7		1 volume
9	A collection of two spin-off stories. The first is "The Flame Road Traveller", which tells the story of Talsh empire secret agent Hugo Alayutan as a young man. The second is "My Fifteen Year Old Self", which traces the story of Balsa the spear woman.			1 volume
10	風と行く者	Kaze to Iku Mono	Traveler of the Wind	1 volume
10	November 2018	ISBN 978-4-03-540550-4		1 volume

The series also includes Balsa's Table (バルサの食卓, Barusa no Shokutaku) (ISBN 978-4-10-130278-2), a non-fiction volume that includes cooking recipes with photos of the cuisines described in the series; and Complete Guide to Guardian of the Spirit (「守り人」のすべて, Moribito no Subete) (ISBN 978-4-03-750140-2), an extensive guidebook with background information on the setting and characters and a new short story, "Haru no Hikari" (春の光) by Nahoko Uehashi, about Balsa and Tanda's relationship.

As of 2010, the series sold over 1.5 million copies in Japan and won "a series of literary awards in Japan".

=== China ===
Sharp Point Press and China Children's Publishing House respectively distribute the novels in Taiwan and mainland China.

=== U.S. release ===
The English translation of the first book, published by Arthur A. Levine Books, appeared in the summer of 2008; the second book's translation appeared in April 2009.

Both books won the Mildred L. Batchelder Award from the American Library Association, the first volume in 2009, and the second, in 2010.

Due to unsatisfactory sales, publishing of the series in the U.S. has since been indefinitely suspended by Scholastic.

Title	Publication date	ISBN	Notes
Moribito: Guardian of the Spirit	June 2008 (hardcover); April 2009 (paperback)	ISBN 978-0-545-00542-5 (hardcover); ISBN 978-0-545-00543-2 (paperback)	
Moribito II: Guardian of the Darkness	May 2009 (hardcover)	ISBN 978-0-545-10295-7 (hardcover)	

=== Other ===
Some volumes of the series have also been translated to Italian, Korean, Vietnamese, Macedonian, Portuguese and Spanish.

== Media ==
Moribito has since been adapted into numerous media, including radio, manga and anime adaptations.

=== Radio drama ===
Satoshi Maruo adapted Moribito: Guardian of the Spirit and Moribito II: Guardian of the Darkness into radio drama series, which aired in NHK-FM Broadcast's program Youth Adventure. The first series and second series aired from August 7, 2006, to August 18 of the same year and from April 16, 2007, to April 27 of the same year respectively.

=== Anime ===
The series has been adapted into a 26 episode anime television series, produced by Production I.G and directed by Kenji Kamiyama, which premiered in Japan on NHK from April 7, 2007. The anime was based entirely on the first novel, Moribito: Guardian of the Spirit, and greatly expands the midsection of the novel.

At the Tokyo International Anime Fair 2007 in March, Geneon announced that they have acquired the license to the anime and Scholastic announced they have US distribution rights to the novels. After Geneon discontinued its distribution division, the rights transferred to Media Blasters. The series premiered in the United States at 1:30 a.m. on August 24, 2008, on Cartoon Network's Adult Swim block, but was dropped from the schedule without warning or explanation on January 15, 2009, after two runs of the first ten episodes.

On June 13, 2009, the series was back on Cartoon Network's Adult Swim block in the United States at 1:30 a.m. Sundays, but was moved to 2:30 a.m. Eastern time, swapping it with Fullmetal Alchemist in November.

=== Manga ===
A manga adaptation of Moribito: Guardian of the Spirit by Kamui Fujiwara was published in Square Enix's magazine Monthly Shōnen Gangan from the April 2007 issue to the August 2008 issue. Its spin-off titled ジン ～アニメ精霊の守り人外伝～ (Jin ~Anime Seirei no Moribito Gaiden~) was published in the same company's another magazine Young Gangan from the 9th 2008 issue to the 17th 2008 issue.

A manga adaptation of Moribito II: Guardian of the Darkness by Yū was published in Asahi Shimbun Publications' shōjo magazine Nemuki+ from August 12, 2014.

=== TV drama ===
Moribito: Guardian of the Spirit is a 2016 Japanese television drama series produced by Japan's NHK network, consisting of 22 episodes covering three of the novels in the Moribito series.

Four episodes adapting the material in the first novel, Moribito: Guardian of the Spirit, were broadcast in 2016, and another nine adapted from the multi-volume novel Kami no Moribito aired in 2017. The remaining nine began in November 2017 and continue into 2018. It appears this third and final season will adapt Moribito II: Guardian of the Darkness, which takes place in Balsa's home country of Kambal.

The series is licensed for Northern America by Digital Media Rights and available to watch in the region on AsianCrush and Hoopla.

== Analysis ==
The series has been called "one of the high points of the genre of fantasy writing for YA and children in Japan". Its themes are relevant to contemporary global society, which also resulted in the series success abroad. Those themes include traditional YA themes such as family and friendship, but also more realistic ones such as romantic love, work, sex, gender, and war. Other themes discussed by scholars include "loyalty to promises made, protection of a child in danger, the commitment to restore balance in the world", as well as "society and borders, respect for living creatures, destiny, politics and power, and the influence of religion".

As Balsa, a female, is the spear wielder, and her romantic partner, Tanda, is a shaman, Yasuko Doi has noted this represents a reversal of "the typical sword hero and mage hero roles common in mid-twentieth-century western fantasy". Traditional gender roles are also challenged by themes such as Tanda's fondness of cooking and prince Chagum's story of "giving birth" to an otherworldly "egg". Similar observation has been made by Helen Kilpatrick who noted that Balsa's character and her relationships with others "casts light on the state of some of Japan's changing attitudes on gender, workforce and family roles".

Helen Kilpatrick and Orie Muta also analyzed the series as a study and critique of "ideologies of a homogenous Japan" and "challenging Nihonjinron", showing "the importance of diversity and collaboration" between different ethnic groups and nation states. Many characters, including Balsa herself, are effectively outsiders (foreigners) or ethnic minorities, and this relates to another serious and controversial theme of the novel - that of colonialism; in particular, Japanese relations with the Ainu people. The theme of deconstructing myths and legends and rediscovering real history, or witnessing how behind-the-scene power plays create false, propaganda-related narratives results in the series questioning "hegemonic power constructions". In the Japanese context, this can be seen as an "unconventional critique of many Japanese ideologies and national institutions", challenging the audience to consider their "dominant understandings of, for instance, Japan's emperor system". They attribute this partially to the author's background as an anthropologist.

The series has been described as popular, receiving an anime, a live action adaptation and numerous translations. The popularity of the Moribito series has resulted in a significant number of fan fiction works inspired by it. While initially marketed for younger audiences, the series has been described as popular among adults as well.
