= Yuko Shimizu (illustrator) =

Japanese illustrator

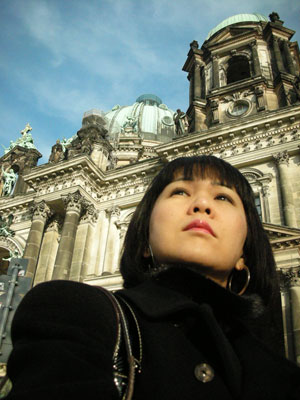
- Shimizu in 2012
- Born: Tokyo, Japan
- Education: Waseda University; School of Visual Arts (MFA)
- Known for: Illustration, comic books
- Awards: Hamilton King Award, 2018; Gold Medal, Society of Illustrators; 2 Silver Medals, Society of Illustrators
- Website: yukoart.com

Yuko Shimizu (清水裕子) is a Japanese illustrator based in New York City whose work combines Japanese heritage with contemporary reference points. Works by Shimizu address a range of serious issues including sex, race, and cultural identity, but also can be light and whimsical.

== Early life and education ==
Shimizu was born 1965 in Tokyo, Japan, and grew up primarily in Kanagawa Prefecture. At the age of eleven, her father's company moved the family to the United States where they settled in Westchester County, New York, and lived there for four years before returning to Japan. According to Shimizu, attending middle school in the US encouraged a sense of individuality in her that she would take back to Japan and that was not customary for women in the Japanese culture of the time.

Having a great appreciation for Japanese comics, Shumizu imagined becoming a manga artist as a young girl. However, when it came time for university, her parents dissuaded her from following an art education and she attended Waseda University in Tokyo with a major in Faculty of Commerce. She graduated in 1988 as valedictorian. Her first job was in the PR department of a large Japanese corporation, headquartered in Tokyo.

== Second education ==
After many years of working in PR, Shimizu realized that women in the firm who had been there for multiple decades were not advancing and decided to pursue an MFA in illustration in the United States. As a non-U.S. resident, she needed to prove she had enough money for four years of tuition and living expenses and saved for two years to have enough money to apply. After eleven years with the PR firm and enough money in the bank to obtain a visa, Shimizu traveled to New York and interviewed at the Pratt Institute, Parsons School of Design, and the School of Visual Arts.

She moved to New York City with two suitcases. In 1999 she enrolled in the School of Visual Arts. After finishing her sophomore year, she was accepted into the MFA Illustration as Visual Essay program. Under Marshall Arisman she created a personal alphabet book project called Letters of Desire as part of her graduate studies. Shimizu's roommate when she began graduate studies was James Jean, who would illustrate 81 covers for Fables. She graduated in May 2003 with a Masters in Illustration.

Upon completion of her MFA, Shimizu moved into a Manhattan studio with two other friends, John Hendrix and Katie Yamasaki, both of whom she had met in grad school. The three artists wanted a studio that would be easily accessible to magazine and newspaper publishers.

== Illustration career ==
Shimizu began illustrating professionally in 2003 soon after she completed her master's degree. Her first client was The Village Voice, with art director Minh Uong. She would soon add The New York Times, The New Yorker, and the Financial Times to her list of patrons.

Between 2007 and 2010, Shimizu illustrated 33 CD insert covers for Now Hear This, which was a recommended music listening list published by the UK magazine The World. Covers in this series always depicted a woman and a music theme.

In 2009, Shimizu was named among the 100 Japanese people the world respect by Newsweek Japan.

Between 2009 and 2015 Shimizu created over 70 covers for the DC Comic Series The Unwritten. In her first cover for the series, Shimizu displayed many of the stylistic trademarks that would later brand her as an innovator in the field of illustration by setting the mood of the big picture of the story. Her 43rd cover would win her a silver medal from the Society of Illustrators.

Shimizu has illustrated for clients, such as Library of Congress, Apple, Adobe, Microsoft, MTV, Target, National Public Radio, Time, The New York Times, The New Yorker, Rolling Stone, GQ, and many more.

In 2018, Shimizu would win the Hamilton King Award, considered by many to be the most prestigious award in illustration.

== Noted works ==
=== Advertising ===
- Tokyo Night Show, 2015 Spectrum Award
- Tame Your Hair, 2012, art director Jimmy Lee, Gold Medal, Society of Illustrators
- Tiger Beer billboard, 2010 Association of Illustrators, Silver Award, commissioned by CHI & Partners

=== Poster work ===
- 2016 National Book Festival, Library of Congress
- 2016 School of Visual Arts

=== Comics ===
- The Unwritten, covers 1-54, DC Comics, Silver Medal, Society of Illustrators, 2012
- Unwritten: Apocalypse, covers 1–9, DC Comics
- Spy VS Spy Reimagined, Silver Medal, Society of Illustrators, 2017

=== Editorial ===
- Bells & Whistles, 2006 Magazine Cover of the Year, Society of Publication Designers

== Charitable works ==
The Gap Product Red In 2009, Shimizu collaborated with The Gap's AIDS charity line Product RED to create five limited-edition T-shirts (two for men, three for women) for the North American market.

Robin Hood Foundation L!brary Initiative Under the auspices of the Robin Hood Foundation and Pentagram's charitable L!brary Initiative, Shimizu collaborated with graphic designer Stefan Sagmeister on an 11-panel mural for P.S. 96 in the Bronx. The project was showcased in the New York Times and in the commemorative book L!brary (Princeton Architectural Press, 2010).

== Selected Bibliography ==
=== Illustrator ===
- The Cat Man of Aleppo, 2020, published by Penguin Random House, written by Karim Shamsi-Basha and Irene Latham
- Japanese Tales, 2018, published by The Folio Society, written by Royall Tyler, Translated and Edited by Royall Tyler
- A Crack in the Sea, 2017, written by H.M. Bouwman, published by Putnam
- A Wild Swan, 2015, written by Michael Cunningham, published by Farrar Straus and Giroux
- Barbed Wire Baseball, 2013, published by Abrams, written by Marissa Moss
- Moribito II: Guardian of the Darkness, 2009, published by 2009 by Arthur A. Levine Books, written by Nahoko Uehashi

=== Author and illustrator ===
- Living with Yuko Shimizu, 2016, Roads Publishing
- Yuko Shimizi, 2011, Gestalten

=== Including work by Shimizu ===
- Fifty Years of Illustration, 2014, published by Laurence King, by Lawrence Zeegen and Caroline Roberts
- 100 Illustrators, 2014, published by Taschen, edited by Steven Heller and Julius Wiedemann
- Things I Have Learned in My Life So Far(updated), 2013, published by Abrams Books, written by Stefan Sagmeister
- How to be an Illustrator, 2008, by Darrel Rees, Laurence King Publishing
- Illustration A Visual History, 2008, published by Abrams Books, by Steven Heller and Seymour Chwast
- Illustration Now, 2005, published by Taschen, written by Julius Wiedemann

== Teaching ==
After graduation from SVA, BFA Cartooning and BFA Illustration Chair, Thomas Woodruff asked Shimizu to teach the summer classes in the BFA Illustration and Cartooning Department Pre-College program and she did so between 2003 and 2004 . Shimizu has continued as an educator, teaching in the BFA Illustration program at SVA since 2014. Shimizu also travels to teach at workshops as well as teaching inking techniques and drawing online through Skillshare.

== Working process ==
Shimizu begins with a loose sketch, which is then enlarged to the size she wishes to draw the finished work at and then this is loosely transferred to watercolor paper using a light box and an HB pencil. She believes the HB is not too hard a graphite to leave marks on the paper and is soft enough to easily erase. She often cuts the watercolor paper, then spends hours, and sometimes days drawing with a Japanese brush that is specifically designed to write sutra as part of Buddhist practice. Using the loose sketch as a starting point, Shimizu tries to imagine and execute the details of the work as they are inked to make the final drawing process fluid. The finished drawing is then scanned and digitally colored in Photoshop. Color proofs are created to ensure consistency and to check details. When in art school, her professor Thomas Woodruff told the class it can look inappropriate when an illustrator includes a signature on commissioned work, and her work remains unsigned because of this influence. If someone purchases an original work from Shimizu, it is signed on the back. Shimizu does all preliminary work on archival thick photo-copy paper, and stores these in a clear pocket for each project, which are organized in order. These are stored on a bookshelf which holds all sketches from every project Shimizu has created.

== Exhibitions ==
- Hanami: Beyond the Bloom an interactive exhibit at Artechouse, 2020
- Go West! exhibition of American Illustration, 2018, Designforum Wien, Museumsplatz, Austria, curated by Peter Diamond
- Facing Humanity, Northwestern University, 2018, curated by Scott Bakal
- Point of Vision: Celebrating Women Artists in Fantasy and Science Fiction, 2016, Museum of American Illustration, curated by Irene Gallo and Lauren Panepinto
- Little Nemo: Dream another Dream, Ohio State University, 2016
- Prometheus Eternal, Philadelphia Museum of Art, 2015
- New York View: MTA Arts and Design Illustrates the city, 2015, Museum of American Illustration
- Blow Up, 2010, Museum of American Illustration

== Awards ==
- Caldecott Honor, 2021, The Cat Man of Aleppo
- Silver Medal, (Book Series) The Cat Man of Aleppo, Society of Illustrators, 2021
- Gold Medal (surface/product design), Interactive Exhibit: Hanami with Artechouse, Society of Illustrators, 2021
- Winner, (Picture Book Category), The Cat Man of Aleppo, Middle East Outreach Council, 2020
- Nominee, (Best Professional Artist) The Hugo Awards, 2020
- Silver Medal, (Book Series), Japanese Tales, Folio Society, art director, Raquel Leis Allion, Society of Illustrators, 2019
- Hamilton King Award, 2018
- Hugo Award Best Professional Artist Award, 2018
- California Young Reader Medal, 2018, Museum of Tolerance Young Reader Award, 2014 and California Reading Association's and Eureka! Nonfiction Eureka Honor Award, 2013 for Barbed Wire Baseball, published by Abrams Books for Young Readers
- Silver Medal (Editorial), Society of Illustrators 2017, for Spy Vs. Spy Reimagined, art directed by Ryan Flanders, published by Mad Magazine
- Silver Medal (Advertising), Spectrum 2015, for Tokyo Night Show, art directed by Takeshi Ishikawa, client Leegent
- Gold Medal (Advertising), Society of Illustrators, 2013, for Tame Your Hair, client JW T Hong
- Silver Medal, Society of Illustrators, 2012, for The Unwritten #43 cover
- Silver Medal (advertising), Association of Illustrators, 2010 for Tiger Beer Billboard
- Silver Medal, (Book), Ryunosuke Akutagawa, Albert Tang, art directed by Rodrigo Corral, Society of Illustrators, 2010
- Silver Medal (Advertising), Spectrum 2009, for Little Red Polka Dots and Other Stories, client Microsoft UltimatePC
- D&AD: Yellow Pencil (2006)
- Magazine Cover of the Year, Society of Publication Designers, 2006 for PLANSPONSOR art directed by SooJin Buzelli
- Art Directors Club of New York: Merit (2006)

== Personal life ==
Shimizu maintains the studio she rented and shared with other students after graduation from SVA, but now works out of that Manhattan location alone. Shimizu's parents live in Tokyo and she has an older sister in New York who is in banking/accounting. She enjoys cooking, brings meals to work with her each day, and maintains a strict separation between her work and home life.
