= The Beast Player =

Japanese novel series

- Cover art of the first volume of the original novel

獣の奏者 (Kemono no Sōsha)
- Genre: Fantasy
- Novel series
- Written by: Nahoko Uehashi
- Illustrated by: Itoe Takemoto
- Published by: Kodansha
- English publisher: NA: Henry Holt and Co.; UK: Pushkin Children's Books
- Original run: November 21, 2006 – August 11, 2009
- Volumes: 4
- Manga
- Written by: Nahoko Uehashi
- Illustrated by: Itoe Takemoto
- Published by: Kodansha
- English publisher: NA: Kodansha USA
- Magazine: Monthly Shōnen Sirius
- Original run: October 25, 2008 – April 8, 2016
- Volumes: 11
- Anime television series

Erin
- Directed by: Takayuki Hamana
- Produced by: George Wada
- Written by: Junichi Fujisaku
- Music by: Masayuki Sakamoto
- Studio: Production I.G; Trans Arts
- Original network: NHK
- Original run: January 10, 2009 – December 26, 2009
- Episodes: 50

The Beast Player (獣の奏者, Kemono no Sōja) (Note: In the original Japanese title, the word translated "player" in the English edition (Japanese: 奏者; note that the title uses the reading sōja instead of the usual sōsha) is a term used historically for a mōshitsugi (申次) the liaison between the Japanese court and the bakufu, but the word is also used today for a musician, someone playing a musical instrument, not a player of games.) is a Japanese novel series written by Nahoko Uehashi and published by Kodansha between 2006 and 2009. It focuses on a girl who can control the greatest of beasts as she gets involved in a war between two territories of one kingdom.

The original novel has been adapted as a manga serialized in Kodansha's Monthly Shōnen Sirius since October 25, 2008, and as an anime television series, called Erin (獣の奏者エリン, Kemono no Sōja Elin) produced by Production I.G and Trans Arts that aired in Japan on NHK from January 10 to December 26, 2009.

== Plot ==
=== The original novel ===
10-year-old Elin lives with her mother Sohyon in the kingdom of Lyoza. They live in territory governed by the Aluhan, the Grand Duke. Their village raises Toda, dragon-like creatures ridden by the Aluhan's army. Sohyon, who is from a secretive nomadic tribe called the Ahlyo, is the head Toda Steward. One night, the Toda under her care mysteriously die. Sohyon is blamed for their death and sentenced to be eaten alive by wild Toda. On the day of the execution, Elin attempts to save her mother, but Toda surround them before they can escape. Sohyon warns Elin that what she is about to do is a mortal sin: She whistles to the Toda, and for a moment they become calm. She places Elin on the back of a Toda, and it carries Elin away while the remaining Toda devour Sohyon.

Elin washes ashore in land governed directly by the Yojeh, the divine ruler of Lyoza. An elderly beekeeper named Joeun adopts her. He teaches her how to play the harp. One summer, Joeun and Elin take their bees deep into the mountains. They see wild Royal Beasts, dangerous and majestic creatures that are symbols of the Yojeh. When Toda attack a Royal Beast cub, the cub's mother whistles, causing the Toda to tamely submit while the mother slaughters them.

Elin turns 14. She enrolls at Kazalumu Beast Sanctuary to become a beast doctor. She meets Leelan, an injured young Royal Beast. Leelan has refused to eat since her injury and is near death. Elin begs the headmistress Esalu to be allowed to care for Leelan. Esalu agrees. When Elin uses her harp to imitate the sounds of wild Beasts, Leelan eats. Elin begins raising Leelan like a wild Beast. She refuses to use the Silent Whistle, which protects beast doctors by paralyzing the Beasts, or to give Leelan tokujisui, a potion required by the Royal Beast Canon. Leelan becomes unusually attached to Elin, allowing Elin to approach and even touch her.

When Elin is 18, Leelan learns to fly, a skill unheard of in captive Beasts. An Ahlyo approaches Elin. He tells her that communicating with Beasts is a mortal sin, and he warns her that allowing Leelan to fly will cause unspeakable disaster. That winter, an injured wild Royal Beast named Eku is brought to Kazalumu for treatment. Eku mates with Leelan, who becomes the first captive beast ever pregnant.

Elin graduates at the top of her class. So that she may continue to care for Leelan, she becomes a teacher at Kazalumu. Leelan bears a cub, Alu. The elderly Yojeh Halumiya visits Kazalumu to see Alu. When the Yojeh and her adult nephew Damiya approach, Eku moves to protect his cub. Everyone sees Elin calm Eku with her harp. Damiya tries to convince Elin to move herself and Leelan to Lazalu Beast Sanctuary, near the capital, but Elin refuses.

As the Yojeh returns home, Toda riders ambush her. Elin rides Leelan into battle. Leelan slaughters the attackers, but the Yojeh suffers a concussion. When the Yojeh recovers, she asks Elin to protect her with Leelan. Elin refuses. Alone with the Yojeh and the Yojeh's bodyguard Ialu, Elin explains that the Yojeh's ancestor designed the Royal Beast Canon so that beasts would never fly, bear young, or become friendly with humans. She retells the story the Ahlyo told her. The Yojeh decides that she does not need Leelan's protection, but she dies suddenly upon reaching home. Her granddaughter Seimiya becomes the new Yojeh.

The Aluhan is the only person who commands Toda troops, so he is widely suspected of having ordered Yojeh Halumiya's assassination. When Yojeh Seimiya rejects his peace offerings, he sends his eldest son Shunan. Shunan, who has been in love with Seimiya for years, delivers an ultimatum: In four months, Seimiya must marry him or meet him in battle on the plain of Tahai Azeh.

Damiya demands that Elin train an army of Beasts and threatens to kill Esalu if she does not. Elin says she is the only one who can talk to the beasts. As proof, she attempts to teach Ohooli, the head of Lazalu Beast Sanctuary, to calm beasts with her harp. He fails.

Damiya attempts to assassinate Ialu, who hides with Elin in Leelan's stable. When Damiya comes searching for Ialu, Elin hides him under Leelan's wings. That night, Ialu explains that he has been investigating Damiya and that Damiya was behind Yojeh Harumiya's assassination.

Elin secretly visits Seimiya. She recounts the story the Ahylo told her: The king of Ofahlon, threatened by his neighbors, asked the Toga mi Lyo tribe to raise an army of Toda. The victorious king built an empire, but the remorseful Toga mi Lyo rebelled. The king fled. He formed an alliance with a young priestess from a Beast-riding tribe. When her army invaded Ofahlon, the Toda and Beasts did not stop fighting until Ofahlon had been annihilated. The Toga mi Lyo swore to never again reveal how to control Toda and Beasts, and they became known as the Ahlyo. The repentant priestess became the first Yojeh and wrote the Royal Beast Canon. Elin concludes by accusing Damiya of assassinating Seimiya's grandmother. Seimiya promises that Elin will not need to fly into battle.

The Aluhan's forces assemble on Tahai Azeh. The Yojeh asks her servant for a flag of surrender, but Damiya wrenches it away. Ialu shoots Damiya's hand with an arrow, and Seimiya raises the flag. The Aluhan and Shunan halt their troops, but the Aluhan's younger son Nugan slays his father. Seimiya pleads with Elin to save Shunan. Elin rides Leelan to Shunan. Since Leelan can carry only one, Elin gets off Leelan's back so that Shunan can mount. She is struck by an arrow and crumples to the ground. Leelan, having delivered Shunan, returns. She delicately lifts Elin in her mouth and, purring, flies away from Tahai Azeh.

== Characters ==
=== Main characters ===
Elin (エリン, Elin)
Voiced by: Nanase Hoshii
The female protagonist of the series.with green eyes She is described as kind, collected, earnest, and very observant. She is 10 at the beginning, then she becomes 14 in the first time-skip and 18 in the second. Due to the influences of her mother Sohyon and foster father, Joeun, Elin carries a unique perspective on caring for beasts. Many people think that she is too curious, which simply gets her in trouble. Elin is truly caring towards people and animals, even to the point of worrying more about others than herself. She is strongly against using the Toda and Royal Beasts for war and even refuses to give Leelan special water (tokujisui), which strengthens her, and use the Silent Whistle on her, which paralyzes a Royal Beast. She dreams that one day humans and beasts may understand each other and that beasts (mainly Toda and Royal Beast) would not be bound by human codes. Because Elin's mother was of the Ahlyo, she inherited her green hair and eyes. Some people first believed that she was able to be close to Leelan and Eku because she learned magic tricks of the Ahlyo from her mother, but they later see her as someone who just wants to truly understand animals. Her classmates know her as the Royal Beast fanatic. Elin's name translates to "wild apple". Both Joeun and Kirik comment that they are free-thinking and unique; similar to Elin's personality. As the series progresses, she becomes a Master at Kazalumu to stay by Leelan. At the end of the anime series, it is hinted that Elin ends up with Ialu, and has a son named Jesh.
Leelan (リラン, Riran)
A female Royal Beast that Elin takes care of in Kazalumu. She is "raised" by Elin, and later sees her as her mother and the only human Leelan is accustomed to. Later in the story, she regains the ability to fly and mates with a wild Royal Beast named Eku. They have a baby named Aru. Her name literally translates to "light."
Eku (エク, Eku)
A male Royal Beast in Elin's care in Kazalumu. Eku was originally a wild Royal Beast but was injured from a Silent Whistle. Eku, being from the wild, had no trust towards humans, however, after spending a night at his shed, Elin becomes the only human he trusts. He lives in Kazalumu to stay by Leelan's side. Esalu reveals that his name derives from an ancient language.

=== Yojeh territory ===
Halumiya (ハルミヤ, Harumiya)
Voiced by: Ikuko Tani
The Yojeh of Lyoza. She is a gentle woman who cares for her country and her people very much. Her childlike demeanor suggests that she is not familiar with society outside the walls of her home. She detests war and her nephew Damiya since she knows that Damiya has an agenda of his own. Her fear came true as Damiya commanded a Toda squadron (Sai Gamulu (firstly mistaken as the Aluhan's army because of the similarity)) to assassinate her, which caused her death.
Seimiya (セィミヤ, Seimiya)
Voiced by: Takahashi Mikako
The granddaughter of Halumiya, a beautiful young woman who is next in line to become the Yojeh. She is a kind and gentle person who, like her grandmother, detests war but likes her first cousin once removed, Damiya. Seimiya has deep feelings for Shunan, the Aluhan's eldest son. However, such feelings were weakened due to the manipulation of Damiya, who attempted to weaken their bonds so that he could take the throne easily. Fortunately, the plan failed after she and Shunan understood each other and strengthened their feelings to each other. In the end, she married Shunan to unite the two territories together.
Damiya (ダミヤ, Damiya)
Voiced by: Akira Ishida
The nephew of Halumiya. He is very secretive and cunning. Damiya tends to make passes on women who he is interested in but manages to be swayed by Elin. However, he is not just a mere playboy, but also a very cunning manipulator who has his own army (the Sai Gamulu) at his disposal. He weakens the bond between the Aluhan and the Yojeh by framing the Aluhan for trying to rebel against the Yojeh so that he can take the rule of the country easily. However, the plan is noticed by Halumiya, which caused Damiya to eliminate her with his own Sai Gamulu while pushing the blame to Shunan, which further weakens the bond between Shunan and Seimiya. However, his plan was thwarted when Elin appeared and saved Shunan and Seimiya while Damiya attempted to kill them all for the final phase of his plan. With the two reunited, he attempted to kill them with a knife but is killed by Ialu instead.
Ialu (イアル, Iaru)
Voiced by: Kenichi Suzumura
One of the Yojeh's personal bodyguards, the Se Zan. He is known throughout the nation as "Godspeed Ialu" for his ability to run at an inhuman pace. He is one of the few Se Zan the Royal Family trusts personally. Ialu acts cold and unsociable around others, even to his comrades and his mentor. He takes his job, protecting the Yojeh and the Princess, very seriously. However, he has a soft spot for Elin, who is the only person he smiles much at and the only person who knows of his past. For her safety, he tries to keep his distance from her. He later becomes one of the few people who know Elin's dark past and promises that he'll keep quiet about it until the time is ready. There are hints showing that he may be in love with Elin. At the end of the series, it is hinted that he is married to Elin and has a son named Jeshi.

=== Aluhan territory ===
Shunan (シュナン, Shunan)
Voiced by: Eiji Hanawa
The Aluhan's older son and one of the head captains of the Aluhan's Toda Army. He reports to the royal palace about his father's condition. Shunan wants to change the country into a reformed society wherein which the future Aluhan and Yojeh are united and make decisions together for the two territories without force before the country ends. He expresses this to Seimiya, the next in line to be Yojeh. There are moments showing that he is in love with Seimiya. However, their bond is weakened by the manipulation of Damiya. Eventually, his perseverance to his own feelings pays off when he wins back the heart of Seimiya. At the end of the series, he married Seimiya and joined the two territories together.
Nugan (ヌガン, Nugan)
Voiced by: Kawamoto Naru
Shunan's brother. He wants to prove his worthiness to his father. Nugan respects Shunan, but later, feels betrayed by him. He believes that the country is as it should be: the Yojeh ruling it and the Aluhan protecting it. Nugan is extremely loyal to the Yojeh and decides to go against Shunan without holding back. However, such rashness and loyalty have been used by Damiya to overthrow the Aluhan and Yojeh royalty. In the end, he was defeated.
Sohyon (ソヨン, Sohyon)
Voiced by: Eriko Hirata
The mother of Elin, a Toda Steward of Akeh Village. She was originally a woman of the Ahlyo but left her people when she married Asson, the son of the chief of Ake Village. However, Asson died and left his wife and unborn child to live in the village. Despite her Ahlyo heritage, Sohyon was a gifted beast doctor and was given special permission to care for the village's Toda. She decides to train her daughter Elin to be a Toda vet without teaching her the Ahlyo's forbidden techniques. Sohyon is executed when the Kiba Toda dies in the ponds. She appears many times in Elin's memories, especially in memories of her teaching Elin about animal breeding.

=== Supporting characters ===
Joeun Tohsana (トーサナ・ジョウン, Tōsana Joun)
Voiced by: Naoya Uchida
Elin's foster father and a beekeeper living in Yojeh territory. Joeun used to be a teacher at a very prestigious school but was kicked out due to defending one of his students. When he meets Elin, he decides to teach her about beekeeping. When Elin becomes infatuated with Royal Beasts, Joeun helps her gain admittance to Kazalumu. He later dies during the course of the series.
Nuk and Mok (ヌック, モック, Nukku, Mokku)
Voiced by: Fujiwara Keiji, Tetsuya Yanagihara
Original to the anime adaptation. Two former thieves from Aluhan territory. They were asked by an unknown man to steal Toda eggs for a large amount of money but failed in doing so, meeting Elin in the process. Because of her kindness towards them, they vowed to stay by her side to "repay her." They become Joeun's helpers on his ranch and the head handymen of Kazalumu later. They are often seen as the comic relief of the series and call Elin "Little Miss" and "Elin-Chan."
Esalu (エサル, Esaru)
The headteacher at Kazalumu. She is an old friend of Joeun, Elin's foster father, and helped Elin with her times at Kazalumu. She decided to let Elin take care of Leelan because Elin had the experience of witnessing a wild Royal Beast family breed, and was the one who concluded that Leelan saw Elin as her mother. Esal looks out for Elin as a foster mother.
Tomura (トムラ, Tomura)
Elin's upperclassman. He is respected by his peers and underclassmen. Tomura was originally the person in charge of Leelan. But Elin, a middle schooler, was put in charge of taking care of Leelan and Tomura, a high schooler was dismissed. After seeing Elin's determination, he becomes intrigued by her and develops a crush on her. This shows when he said he would protect her from those who see Elin's bond with Leelan as a potential weapon for war.
Kirik (キリク, Kiriku)
Original to the anime adaptation. A new Master who transfers from Tamuyuan, a prestigious beastinarian school. He is secretly a member of the Sai Gamulu whose sister was killed by poison from a Wajyaku. Kirik is under orders from Damiya and is assigned undercover as a teacher in Kazalumu. He is very knowledgeable about poison and always has an eerie smile. He first sees Elin as a potential weapon, but later wants to protect her because she resembles his sister.
Nahson (ナソン, Nason)
The explorer from the Ahlyo. He was Sohyon's fiancee before she left the tribe to marry Elin's father. He is there when she faces the judgment of the Toda, as he was put to the task of watching over her, and he vows to look after Elin in her place since he could not keep her from dying. He is the one who tells Elin about the "Great Sin".

=== Groups ===
Wajak (大公領民, Wajaku)
The citizens from Aluhan's territory and servants in the Aluhan's quarters. They fight under the banner of the Aluhan, and it is their role to protect the Yojeh and go to war. Because of this, the Wajak were seen as bloodthirsty people who loved going to war. Some important people who work under the Aluhan are his two sons and the Toda Stewards.
Sai Gamulu (〈血と穢れ〉, Sai Gamuru)
An underground organization whose goal is to put the Aluhan on the throne. In the past, they attacked the royal palace and murdered Halumiya's mother and grandmother. Damiya used the Sai Gamulu as a cover for his plans to take the throne. They have a very similar appearance to the Aluhan's Toda battalion so that they can put the blame on the Aluhan.
Se Zan (〈堅き楯〉, Se Zan)
The Yojeh's royal bodyguards. The Se Zan are recruited when they are at a young age to be trained to have only one thing in mind: protect the Yojeh and her family at all costs. They are trained to cut all ties with their family and friends so that they only have the thought of protecting the Yojeh in their minds. They are even trained to ban their emotions.
Holon (真王領民, Horon)
The citizens from Yojehterritory and the servants in the Yojeh's quarters. Unlike Wajak, Holon are people who hate violence and are against the idea of war. They live in Yojeh territory seeking a peaceful life from the battlefield. Some important people who work under the Yojeh are the Se Zan and the Royal Beast doctors.
Ahlyo (霧の民, Āryo)
An ancient ethnic group known for their green eyes. Legends say that this clan held the secrets to controlling animals, especially Toda and Royal Beasts. But because of an incident many centuries ago involving Jeh and these secrets getting out, they promised to never let these secrets out to outsiders again. They became nomadic and they would hide in the mist. Their true name is Ao-Loh (戒律ノ民, Aō-rō), meaning People of the Law, but because of their association with the mist, other societies started to call them "Ahlyo" (People of the Mist).

== Media ==
=== Novels ===
The original novel was published in two volumes by Kodansha on November 21, 2006. They have since been reprinted in bunkoban format. The sequel, titled The Beast Warrior in English publications, was published on August 10, 2009.

==== Tankōbon (novels) ====
Title	Release date	Length	ISBN
"The Beast Player I: The Toda" "Kemono no Sōja Ichi Tōda hen" (獣の奏者 I 闘蛇編)	November 21, 2006	319 pp	4-06-213700-3
"The Beast Player II: The Royal Beasts" "Kemono no Sōja Ni Ōjū hen" (獣の奏者 II 王獣編)	November 21, 2006	414 pp	4-06-213701-1
"The Beast Player III: The Quest" "Kemono no Sōja Tankyū hen" (獣の奏者 III 探求編)	August 10, 2009	484 pp	978-4-06-215632-5
"The Beast Player IV: The Final Chapter" "Kemono no Sōja Kanketsu hen" (獣の奏者 IV 完結編)	August 10, 2009	426 pp	978-4-06-215633-2
"The Beast Player Side Story: A Passing Moment" 獣の奏者 外伝 刹那 ("Kemono no Sōja Gaiden Setsuna")	September 7, 2010	331 pp	978-4-06-216439-9

=== Manga ===
Written and drawn by Itoe Takemoto, a manga adaptation of the novel series was serialized in Kodansha's manga magazine Monthly Shōnen Sirius. On September 12, 2014, Kodansha started republishing the series in bunkoban format.

Kodansha started publishing the series in English on their newly launched K Manga website and app in 2023. In April 2024, Kodansha USA announced that they licensed the manga for digital English publication, with the first volume being released on May 14.

==== Tankōbon (manga) ====
No.	Original release date	Original ISBN	English release date	English ISBN
1	May 22, 2009	978-4-06-373176-7	May 14, 2024	978-1-68-491430-2
2	December 22, 2009	978-4-06-373199-6	June 18, 2024	978-1-68-491486-9
3	September 9, 2010	978-4-06-376236-5	July 16, 2024	979-8-88-933457-6
4	April 8, 2011	978-4-06-376261-7	September 24, 2024	979-8-88-933475-0
5	November 9, 2011	978-4-06-376307-2	March 11, 2025	979-8-88-933476-7
6	June 8, 2012	978-4-06-376340-9	—	—
7	May 9, 2013	978-4-06-376399-7	—	—
8	December 9, 2013	978-4-06-376435-2	—	—
9	September 9, 2014	978-4-06-376490-1	—	—
10	October 9, 2015	978-4-06-376574-8	—	—
11	April 8, 2016	978-4-06-390617-2	—	—

==== Bunkoban (manga) ====
No.	Japanese release date	Japanese ISBN
1	September 12, 2014	978-4-06-277910-4
2	October 15, 2014	978-4-06-277911-1
3	November 13, 2014	978-4-06-277975-3
4	December 11, 2014	978-4-06277993-7

=== Anime ===
Directed by Takayuki Hamana, the series aired on NHK from January 10 to December 26, 2009. The opening theme is "Shizuku" (雫) by Sukima Switch, and the ending theme is "After the Rain" by cossami. Under the title of Erin, the series became available on Crunchyroll with English subtitles on September 4, 2009.

== Reception and awards ==
The US edition of The Beast Player was the 2020 Michael L. Printz Award honor book for best young adult novel.

== See also ==
- Interview with Cathy Hirano, who translated The Beast Player into English
