= Moribito: Guardian of the Spirit =

Japanese novel and its franchise

- Hardback cover of the novel

精霊の守り人 (Seirei no Moribito)
- Genre: Sword and sorcery
- Novel
- Written by: Nahoko Uehashi
- Published by: Kaiseisha (hardcover); Shinchosha (paperback)
- English publisher: NA: Scholastic
- Published: July 1996
- Audio drama
- Written by: Satoshi Maruo
- Station: NHK FM Broadcast
- Original run: August 7, 2006 – August 18, 2006
- Episodes: 10
- Manga
- Written by: Nahoko Uehashi
- Illustrated by: Kamui Fujiwara
- Published by: Square Enix
- Magazine: Monthly Shōnen Gangan
- Original run: March 12, 2007 – August 22, 2008
- Volumes: 3
- Anime television series
- Directed by: Kenji Kamiyama
- Written by: Kenji Kamiyama
- Music by: Kenji Kawai
- Studio: Production I.G
- Licensed by: NA: Sentai Filmworks; UK: MVM Entertainment
- Original network: NHK-BS2
- English network: NA: Neon Alley; US: Adult Swim
- Original run: April 7, 2007 – September 29, 2007
- Episodes: 26
- Television drama
- Directed by: Hiroshi Kataoka
- Written by: Sumio Omori
- Original network: NHK
- Original run: March 19, 2016 – January 27, 2018
- Episodes: 22

Moribito: Guardian of the Spirit (Japanese: 精霊の守り人, Hepburn: Seirei no Moribito) is a Japanese novel that was first published in July 1996. It is the first in the 12-volume Moribito (守り人) series of Japanese fantasy novels by Nahoko Uehashi. It was the recipient of the Batchelder Award An ALA Notable Children's Book in 2009. It has since been adapted into numerous media, including radio, manga, anime, and taiga drama adaptations. Scholastic released the first novel in English in June 2008. Media Blasters has confirmed that they acquired the rights to the anime. The anime series adaptation premiered on Adult Swim in the U.S. at 1:30 a.m. ET on August 24, 2008, but was dropped from the schedule without warning or explanation on January 15, 2009, after two runs of the first ten episodes. The program returned to Adult Swim during the summer 2009 line-up with an airing of the entire series.

== Synopsis ==
Balsa, spear wielder and bodyguard, is a wandering warrior who has vowed to atone for eight deaths in her past by saving an equivalent number of lives. On her journey, she saves Prince Chagum and is tasked with becoming his bodyguard. His own father, the Mikado, has ordered his assassination. The two begin a perilous journey to ensure the survival of the prince. Balsa's complicated past begins to come to light and they uncover Chagum's mysterious connection to a legendary water spirit with the power to destroy the kingdom.

== Media ==
=== Novel ===
The novel was first published in hardback by Kaiseisha as children's literature, but it had many adult fans. Shinchosha republished it in bunkobon format in March 2007.

Seirei no Moribito (Guardian of the Spirit) (ISBN 978-4035401506, 1996–07) (Bunko ISBN 978-4-10-130272-0, 2007–03)
Adapted into the anime series. Balsa is hired to protect a prince with a mysterious spirit living inside him.
Published in English by Arthur A. Levine Books/Scholastic in the summer of 2008; translated by Cathy Hirano.

The novel received the Mildred L. Batchelder Award from the American Library Association in 2009.

=== Radio drama ===
The series has been adapted into a radio drama series, written by Satoshi Maruo. It aired in Youth Adventure on NHK FM Broadcast from August 7, 2006, to August 18, 2006.

=== Anime ===
The series has been adapted into an anime television series, produced by Production I.G and directed by Kenji Kamiyama, which premiered in Japan on NHK from April 7, 2007. The anime runs 26 episodes and is based entirely on the first novel in the Guardian series, and greatly expands the midsection of the novel.

At the Tokyo International Anime Fair 2007 in March, Geneon announced that they had acquired the license to the anime and Scholastic announced they had US distribution rights to the novels. After Geneon discontinued its US distribution division, the rights transferred to Media Blasters. The series premiered in the United States at 1:30 a.m. ET on August 24, 2008, on Cartoon Network's Adult Swim block, but was dropped from the schedule without warning or explanation on January 15, 2009, after two runs of the first ten episodes. On June 13, 2009, the series was back on Cartoon Network's Adult Swim block in the United States at 1:30 a.m. ET on Sundays, but was later moved to 2:30 a.m. ET, swapping it with Fullmetal Alchemist in November. Viz Media re-released the entire series on DVD and Blu-ray on August 26, 2014. It also aired on their digital broadcasting channel, Neon Alley January 17, 2014, until the channel's closure on May 6, 2016. In August 2020, Sentai Filmworks announced that they acquired the series for home video and digital release.

The series feature two theme songs. The opening title is "Shine" by L'Arc-en-Ciel, while Sachi Tainaka performs "Itoshii Hito e" for the ending title.

=== Taiga fantasy drama (television) ===
The series has been adapted into a live-action taiga fantasy drama television series by NHK, shot in 4K resolution. It stars Haruka Ayase as Balsa. Season one was shown in four episodes in March and April 2016. Season two was shown over nine episodes from January to March 2017. The third and final season was shown from November 2017 to January 2018, also over nine episodes.

=== Musical ===
A stage musical was produced at Nissay Theater in Tokyo in 2023, starring Rio Asumi as Balsa. It has been released on DVD.

== Reception ==
Daniel Baird reviewed this book and its sequel for Mythprint, praised the first volume as enjoyable both by children and adults due to "plenty of richness in its characterization and fantasy world".
