= Howard Curtis =

British translator

Howard Curtis (born 1949) is a British translator of French, Italian and Spanish fiction. He studied French at the University of Reading and the University of Dijon, France, and theatre directing at the Drama Centre London.

He has written for radio and for the theatre. His plays In Mourning and A Place to Hide were broadcast on BBC Radio in 1979. His adaptation (in collaboration with Martin Crimp) of the Polish play Love Games by Jerzy Przezdziecki was produced at the Orange Tree Theatre, Richmond, in 1982.

He has worked as a translator since 1986. His numerous translations include works by Georges Simenon and other leading European writers such as Gustave Flaubert, Honoré de Balzac, Luigi Pirandello, Beppe Fenoglio, Leonardo Sciascia and Beppe Fenoglio, as well as contemporary writers Edoardo Albinati, Stefano Benni and Gianrico Carofiglio, and has received many translation awards, including the John Florio Prize, Premio Campiello Europa, and Marsh Award for Children's Literature in Translation.

He has led translation workshops and summer school courses at City University London, Warwick University, Bristol and elsewhere, and was a mentor on the British Centre for Literary Translation’s (later the National Centre for Writing’s) translator mentoring scheme.

== Selected translations ==
- The Outlaw (L'Outlaw) by Georges Simenon: Hamish Hamilton (UK) and Harcourt Brace Jovanovich (USA) 1986
- Uncle Charles or Uncle Charles has locked himself in (Oncle Charles s'est enfermé) by Georges Simenon: Hamish Hamilton (UK) and Harcourt Brace Jovanovich (USA) 1988
- The Rules of the Game (La boule noire) by Georges Simenon: Hamish Hamilton (UK) and Harcourt Brace Jovanovich (USA) 1989
- Letter to a Jewish Friend (Lettre à un ami juif) by Ibrahim Souss: Quartet Books (UK) 1989
- Elissa by Fawzi Mellah: Quartet Books (UK) 1990
- Judaean Journal (Journal de Judée) by Jacques Pinto: Quartet Books (UK) 1990
- Secret Dossier: The Hidden Agenda behind the Gulf War (Guerre du Golfe: Le dossier secret) by Pierre Salinger and Eric Laurent: Penguin Books (UK) 1991
- Memoirs from Elsinore (Mémoires d'Elseneur) by Franz Hellens: Peter Lang (USA) 2000
- The Officers' Ward (La chambre des officiers) by Marc Dugain: Phoenix House (UK) 2000 and Soho Press (USA) 2001; shortlisted for the Independent Foreign Fiction Prize, 2001
- Night in the Afternoon (La nuit l'après-midi) by Caroline Lamarche: Grove Press (USA) 2000
- Cosette, or The Time of Illusions (Cosette ou le temps des illusions) by François Cérésa: Pan Macmillan (UK) 2003
- Coming Back: Diary of a Mission to Afghanistan (Il ritorno. Diario di una missione in Afghanistan) by Edoardo Albinati: Hesperus Press (UK) 2004; winner of the John Florio Prize, 2004
- Sarah by Marek Halter: Bantam Press (UK) & Crown Publishing (USA) 2004
- Submission (Entre ses mains) by Marthe Blau: Black Swan (UK) & Atria Books (USA) 2005
- Zipporah or Zipporah, Wife of Moses, by Marek Halter: Bantam Press (UK) & Crown Publishing (USA) 2005
- The Way of the Kings (La Voie Royale) by André Malraux: Hesperus Press (UK) 2005
- Total Chaos (Total Khéops) by Jean-Claude Izzo: Europa Editions (USA) 2005
- A Walk in the Dark (Ad occhi chiusi) by Gianrico Carofiglio: Bitter Lemon Press (UK) 2006
- Lilah by Marek Halter: Bantam Press (UK) & Crown Publishing (USA) 2006
- Chourmo by Jean-Claude Izzo: Europa Editions (USA) 2006
- A Private Affair (Una questione privata) by Beppe Fenoglio: Hesperus Press (UK) 2006
- Who is Lou Sciortino? (Chi è Lou Sciortino?) by Ottavio Cappellani: Farrar, Straus & Giroux (USA) and Picador (UK) 2007
- Solea by Jean-Claude Izzo: Europa Editions (USA) 2007; shortlisted for the annual translation prize of the French-American Foundation, 2008
- Reasonable Doubts (Ragionevoli dubbi) by Gianrico Carofiglio: Bitter Lemon Press (UK) 2007; shortlisted for the Premio Campiello Europa, 2010
- A Florentine Death (Assassini a Firenze) by Michele Giuttari: Abacus (UK) 2007
- The Lost Sailors (Les marins perdus) by Jean-Claude Izzo: Europa Editions (USA) 2007
- The Past is a Foreign Country (Il passato è una terra straniera) by Gianrico Carofiglio: Old Street Publishing (UK) 2007
- The Turn by Luigi Pirandello: Hesperus Press (UK) 2007
- Mary of Nazareth (Marie) by Marek Halter: Crown Publishing (USA) 2008
- Blackout by Gianluca Morozzi: Bitter Lemon Press (UK) 2008
- The Vendetta by Honoré de Balzac: Hesperus Press (UK) 2008
- A Sun for the Dying (Soleil des mourants) by Jean-Claude Izzo: Europa Editions (USA) 2008
- The Phantom of Rue Royale (Le Fantôme de la rue Royale) by Jean-François Parot: Gallic Books (UK) 2008
- Tierra del Fuego by Francisco Coloane: Europa Editions (USA) 2008
- Cacao: The Roots of Chocolate by Dominique Persoone: Éditions Françoise Blouard (Belgium) 2009
- How to Become a Buddha in Five Weeks by Giulio Cesare Giacobbe: Arcturus Publishing (UK) 2009
- Fists (Pugni) by Pietro Grossi: Pushkin Press (UK) 2009: shortlisted for the Independent Foreign Fiction Prize, 2010; winner of the Premio Campiello Europa 2010
- The Nicolas Le Floch Affair (L'Affaire Le Floch) by Jean-François Parot: Gallic Books (UK) 2009
- Three Tales by Gustave Flaubert: Hesperus Press (UK) 2009; shortlisted for the Oxford-Weidenfeld Translation Prize, 2010
- An Education in Happiness by Flavia Arzeni: Pushkin Press (UK) 2009
- Under the Mexican Sky (Sotto il cielo del Messico) by Pino Cacucci: Photology (Italy) 2009
- A Simple Story and Candido by Leonardo Sciascia: Hesperus Press (UK) 2010
- The Saint-Florentin Murders (Le Crime de l'hôtel Saint-Florentin) by Jean-François Parot: Gallic Books (UK) 2010; shortlisted for the Crime Writers’ Association International Dagger, 2011
- The Light In Between by Marella Caracciolo Chia: Pushkin Press (UK) 2010
- Blood Sisters (Una piccola storia ignobile) by Alessandro Perissinotto: Hersilia Press (UK) 2011
- The Shadow of What We Were (Sombra de lo que fuimos) by Luis Sepúlveda: Europa Editions (USA) 2011
- How I Lost the War (Come ho perso la guerra) by Filippo Bologna: Pushkin Press (UK) 2011
- In the Sea There are Crocodiles (Nel mare ci sono i coccodrilli) by Fabio Geda: Harvill Secker/David Fickling Books (UK) and Doubleday (USA) 2011; winner of the 2013 Marsh Award for Children's Literature in Translation.
- The Break (L'Acchito) by Pietro Grossi: Pushkin Press (UK) 2011
- The Baker’s Blood (Le Sang des farines) by Jean-François Parot: Gallic Books (UK) 2012
- Lovers (Des amants) by Daniel Arsand: Europa Editions (USA) 2012
- Necropolis by Santiago Gamboa: Europa Editions (USA) 2012
- About Time (Bastardi senza amore) by Simona Sparaco: Pushkin Press (UK) 2012
- Everybody’s Right (Hanno tutti ragione) by Paolo Sorrentino: Harvill Secker (UK) 2012
- A Private Venus by Giorgio Scerbanenco: Hersilia Press (UK) 2012 & Melville House (USA) 2014
- The Threads of the Heart (Le Cœur cousu) by Carole Martinez: Europa Editions (USA) 2013
- Ten (Dieci) by Andrej Longo: Harvill Secker (UK) 2013
- Traitors to All, or Betrayal, by Giorgio Scerbanenco: Hersilia Press (UK) 2013 and Melville House (USA) 2014
- Garlic, Mint, and Sweet Basil: Marseilles, Noir Fiction, and the Mediterranean (Marseille) by Jean-Claude Izzo: Europa Editions (USA) 2013
- The Parrots (I papagalli) by Filippo Bologna: Pushkin Press (UK) 2013
- Enchantment (Incanto) by Pietro Grossi: Pushkin Press (UK) 2013
- The Silence of the Wave (Il silenzio dell'onda) by Gianrico Carofiglio: Bitter Lemon Press (UK) and Rizzoli (USA) 2013
- Saving Mozart (Sauver Mozart. Le Journal d'Otto J. Steiner) by Raphaël Jerusalmy: Europa Editions (USA) 2013
- The Castle of Whispers (Du domaine des Murmures) by Carole Martinez: Europa Editions (USA) 2014
- The Stein Report (El informe Stein) by José Carlos Llop: Hispabooks (Spain) 2014
- Game for Five (La briscola in cinque) by Marco Malvaldi: Europa Editions (USA) 2014
- Avenue of the Giants (Avenue des géants) by Marc Dugain: Europa Editions (USA) 2014
- The Art of Killing Well by Marco Malvaldi: MacLehose Press (UK) 2014
- The Story of Cyrano de Bergerac by Stefano Benni: Pushkin Press (UK) and McSweeney’s (USA) 2014
- Invisible Love (Les Deux Messieurs de Bruxelles) by Eric-Emmanuel Schmitt: Europa Editions (USA) 2014
- Three Card Monte (Il gioco delle tre carte) by Marco Malvaldi: Europa Editions (USA) 2014
- The Brotherhood of Book Hunters (La Confrérie des chasseurs de livres) by Raphaël Jerusalmy: Europa Editions (USA) 2014
- The Oracle of the Moon (L'Oracle della Luna) by Frédéric Lenoir: Versilio (USA) 2014
- Guys Like Me (Les Types comme moi) by Dominique Fabre: New Vessel Press (USA) 2015
- The African Equation (L'Équation africaine) by Yasmina Khadra: Gallic Books (UK) 2015
- "The Speed of the Angel" by Gianrico Carofiglio in Cocaine by Massimo Carlotto, Gianrico Carofiglio and Giancarlo de Cataldo: MacLehose Press (UK) 2015
- The Cellars of the Majestic (Les caves du Majestic) by Georges Simenon: Penguin Books (UK) 2015
- The Judge’s House (La Maison du juge) by Georges Simenon: Penguin Books (UK) 2015
- Night Prayers (Plegarias nocturnas) by Santiago Gamboa: Europa Editions (USA) 2016
- A Fine Line (La regola dell'equilibrio) by Gianrico Carofiglio: Bitter Lemon Press (UK) 2016
- The Angels Die (Les anges meurent de nos blessures) by Yasmina Khadra: Gallic Books (UK) 2016
- The Penalty Area by Alain Gillot: Europa Editions (USA) 2016
- Madame Maigret’s Friend (L'amie de Mme Maigret) by Georges Simenon: Penguin Books (UK) 2016
- Maigret’s Memoirs (Les mémoires de Maigret) by Georges Simenon: Penguin Books (UK) 2016
- The Carousel of Desire by Eric-Emmanuel Schmitt (co-translated with Katherine Gregor): Europa Editions (USA) 2016
- The Snow was Dirty (La neige était sale) by Georges Simenon: Penguin Books (UK) 2016
- 33 Revolutions by Canek Sánchez Guevara: Europa Editions (USA) 2016
- The Principle (Le Principe) by Jérôme Ferrari: Europa Editions (USA) 2017
- Maigret’s Mistake (Un erreur de Maigret) by Georges Simenon: Penguin Books (UK) 2017
- Maigret and the Dead Girl (Maigret et la jeune morte) by Georges Simenon: Penguin Books (UK) 2017
- Maigret and the Headless Corpse (Maigret et le corps sans tête) by Georges Simenon: Penguin Books (UK) 2017
- Return to the Dark Valley (Volver al oscuro valle) by Santiago Gamboa: Europa Editions (USA) 2017
- Beneath the Mountain or The Mountain (La sostanza del male) by Luca D’Andrea: MacLehose Press (UK) 2017 and Harper Collins (USA) 2018
- Maigret Travels (Maigret voyage) Georges Simenon: Penguin Books (UK) 2018
- The Krull House (Chez Krull) by Georges Simenon: Penguin Books (UK) 2018
- The Cold Summer (L'estate fredda) by Gianrico Carofiglio: Bitter Lemon Press (UK) 2018
- Maigret and the Lazy Burglar (Maigret et le voleur paresseux) by Georges Simenon: Penguin Books (UK) 2018
- Maigret and the Tramp (Maigret et le clochard) by Georges Simenon: Penguin Books (UK) 2018
- Soul of the Border (L'anima della frontiera) by Matteo Righetto: Pushkin Press (UK) 2018
- Maigret Defends Himself (Maigret se defend) by Georges Simenon: Penguin Books (UK) 2019
- Maigret Hesitates (Maigret hésite) by Georges Simenon: Penguin Books (UK) 2019
- Sanctuary by Luca D’Andrea (co-translated with Katherine Gregor): MacLehose Press (UK) 2019
- Diary of a Country Priest (Journal d'un curé de campagne) by Georges Bernanos: Penguin Books (UK) 2019
- The Measure of a Man (La misura dell'uomo) by Marco Malvaldi (co-translated with Katherine Gregor): Europa Editions (USA) 2019
- Maigret and the Loner (Maigret et l'homme tout seul) by Georges Simenon: Penguin Books (UK) 2019
- The Last Homeland (L'ultima patria) by Matteo Righetto: Pushkin Press (UK) 2020
- The Disappearance of Stephanie Mailer (La Disparition de Stephanie Mailer) by Joël Dicker: MacLehose Press (UK) 2020
- The Man from London (L'homme de Londres) by Georges Simenon: Penguin Books (UK) 2020
- The Measure of Time (La misura del tempo) by Gianrico Carofiglio: Bitter Lemon Press (UK) 2021
- Three O'Clock in the Morning (Tre del mattino) by Gianrico Carofiglio: HarperVia (USA) and Text Publishing (Australia) 2021
- The Strangers in the House (Les Inconnus dans la maison) by Georges Simenon: Penguin Books (UK) 2021
- Last Summer in the City (L'ultima estate in città) by Gianfranco Calligarich: Farrar Straus & Giroux (USA) and Picador (UK) 2021
- The Hatter’s Ghosts (Les fantômes du chapelier) by Georges Simenon: Penguin Books (UK) 2022
- The New Investigations of Inspector Maigret by Georges Simenon: Penguin Books (UK) 2022 (part only; some stories translated by Ros Schwartz)
- Nothing is Lost (Rien ne se perd) by Cloë Mehdi: Europa Editions (USA) 2023
- A Private Matter (Una questione privata) by Beppe Fenoglio (revised edition): New York Review Books (USA) 2023
- Foul Deeds and Fine Dying (Morire di cùcuma) by Marco Malvaldi: MacLehose Press (UK) 2023
- The Triumph of the Lions by Stefania Auci (co-translated with Katherine Gregor): HarperVia (USA) 2024
- Fall of the Florios by Stefania Auci (co-translated with Katherine Gregor): HarperVia (USA) 2024
- Human Peoples by Lluís Quintana-Murci: Penguin Books (UK) 2024
- Dogs and Wolves (Prendre les loups pour des chiens) by Hervé Le Corre: Europa Editions (USA) 2024
- A Man of Few Words (Un uomo di poche parole) by Carlo Greppi: Westbourne Press (UK) 2025
- Venice Tales by various authors (including translations by Katherine Gregor): Oxford University Press (UK) 2025
- The Story of Marceau Miller by Marceau Miller: Blackstone Publishing (USA) 2026
- Letter to my Judge by Georges Simenon: Penguin Books (UK) 2026
- The Green Shutters by Georges Simenon: Penguin Books (UK) 2026
