= Helmut Krauss =

German actor (1941–2019)

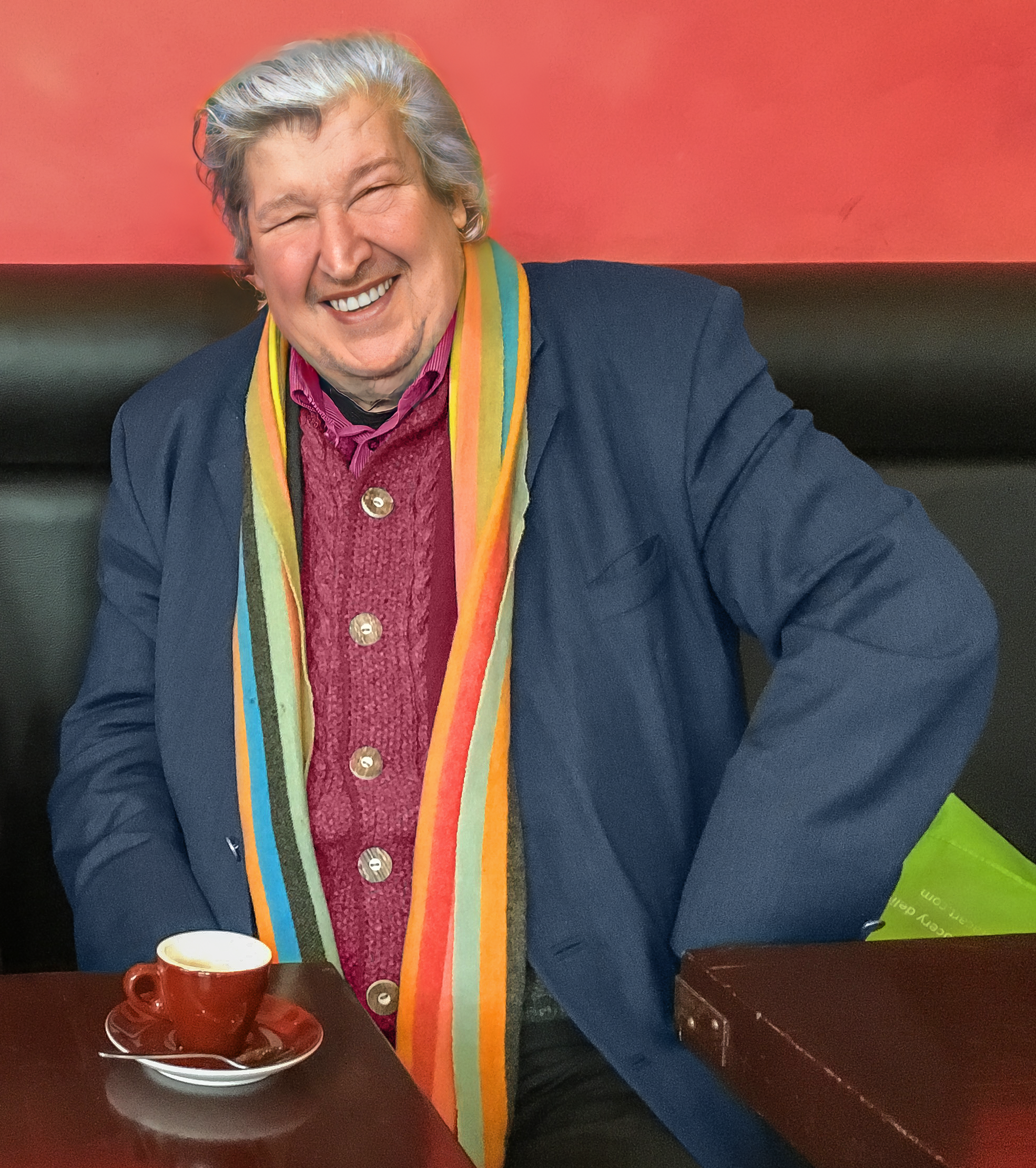
- Krauss in 2016
- Born: 11 June 1941; Augsburg, Bavaria, Germany
- Died: 26 August 2019 (aged 78); Goslar, Lower Saxony, Germany
- Occupations: Actor; voice actor; kabarett artist
- Years active: 1970s–2019
- Website: helmutkrauss.de

Helmut Krauss (11 June 1941 – 26 August 2019) was a German actor. One of his best known roles was that of neighbor Herrmann Paschulke in the ZDF series Löwenzahn between 1981 and 2019.

== Life ==
=== Theater ===
Helmut Krauss trained as an actor and studied pedagogy. He has performed at the Forum Theater, the Grips Theater and the Hansa Theater in Berlin and at the State Theater in Hanover, among others. In the 1970s he also appeared as a reciter at events of the left-wing and socialist movement in West Berlin. As a cabaret artist he has performed as a partner of Hannelore Kaub in the cabaret Das Bügelbrett and several times in Dieter Hildebrandt's Scheibenwischer.

At the Karl May Games in Bad Segeberg in 2005, Helmut Krauss took on the role of Don Geronimo, a friendly innkeeper who runs a cantina in the small Mexican town of Guaymas. At the same time, as in previous years, he played the narrator. The Störtebeker Festival on Rügen hired him for the 2006 season as Ambrosio. In Bregenz he played the role of Paul Bunyan in the play of the same name under the direction of Nicholas Broadhurst. In April 2008 he toured Germany, Austria, Switzerland and Italy with the Theater des Ostens production of The Name of the Rose.

=== Film and TV ===
The list of his appearances in film and television is long. He appeared first in the 1951 Austrian movie series Asphalt. (also known as Die Minderjährige klagen an) as Hellmut Kraus.

In one of his best known roles, he was seen from 1981 to 2019 as neighbor Hermann Paschulke, known as Mr. Paschulke, in Löwenzahn; until 2005 initially alongside Peter Lustig and since 2006 together with Guido Hammesfahr. In this role, Krauss formed the bourgeois contrast to Peter Lustig; the two mostly engaged in friendly rivalries and arguments within the episodes. He had guest appearances in productions such as Berliner Weiße mit Schuß, Tatort, Lukas und Sohn, Der Hausgeist, Praxis Bülowbogen or Pastewka; in the latter he played himself.

He also became known to a nationwide television audience through his portrayal of the plainclothes detective "Django" Fiebig in the police series Direktion City, which was produced by the then SFB in three seasons based on the English model Task Force Police, together with Andreas Mannkopff, Ulli Kinalzik, Klaus Sonnenschein, Gerd Duwner and many other well-known Berlin actors.

In August 2009, Eric Hordes' film The Founder, a satire about the former television station Kanal Telemedial, was shot. Krauss played the title character Gerhard Hornbacher, who parodies the controversial media entrepreneur Thomas Hornauer. Krauss also took on the role of dubbing director in the film, which he co-produced. In 2015, Krauss worked again with director Hordes and appeared in front of the camera for Under ConTroll alongside Eva Habermann, Jiří Lábus and Katy Karrenbauer.

In 2019, Krauss worked with Hordes for a third time and played Inspector Hornbacher in the dramedy series Patchwork Gangsta, produced by SWR for the media channel funk. Two months before his death, he was in front of the camera for Löwenzahn. In honor of his long-standing role as Paschulke in Löwenzahn, the Löwenzahn episode Endlos Haltbarkeit - Wenn aus Nachbars Freunde werden was broadcast for the first time on May 17, 2020, which is intended as a homage to and farewell to Helmut Krauss. In addition, in the very last episode of the television series Pastewka, season 10 episode 10 - "Die Hochzeitskutsche", he was honored in the credits together with Roger Willemsen as a friend of the series.

=== Dubbing and radioplays ===
Krauss has lent his voice to Marlon Brando, John Goodman, Yaphet Kotto, Wilhelm von Homburg, Jean Reno, Samuel L. Jackson, Paul Winfield, Jon Voight and the music project E-Nomine, as well as Reginald VelJohnson (Carl Winslow) in the American sitcom Family Matters. He was also the German voice of the talking horse Mr. Ed in the 1960s American television series of the same name. He voiced Maurice in the German dub of The Penguins of Madagascar and Waternoose in the German dub of Monsters Inc. as well as the Grandfather in the 2015 German TV reboot of Heidi.

Krauss was often cast in villain roles. For example, he voiced Fidget in the Disney animated film Basil, the Great Mouse Detective and Percival C. McLeach in The Rescuers Down Under. In the Disney animated version of The Hunchback of Notre Dame, he voiced the Archdeacon; in the official audio play for the film by Kiddinx, Krauss was also the narrator, as the narrative texts were written from the Archdeacon's perspective. In a television episode of Benjamin Blümchen, he voiced a Bavarian farmer whose daughter is friends with Otto. He was the narrator in the German version of the Japanese anime series Captain Future. In 1987, Krauss lent his dark, menacing voice to the pale-faced nailhead Pinhead in the surreal horror film Hellraiser. In addition to his full-time speaking roles, since 2007 he has also supported the student animated film Dreckmonster (Dirtmonsters) at the Konrad Wolf University of Film and Television in Potsdam-Babelsberg and took on the voice of the lead role Willi in the German version.

In 2002 and 2003, he also toured Germany with Die drei ??? speakers Oliver Rohrbeck, Jens Wawrczeck and Andreas Fröhlich with the live radio play Die drei ???: Master Of Chess, where he took on the role of narrator. He also did so again in 2009 in the live radio play Die drei ??? und der seltsame Wecker: Live and Ticking and in 2014 in Phonophobia - Symphony of Fear. In Oliver Döring's Star Wars radio play Labyrinth of Evil (based on the novel of the same name by James Luceno; - ISBN 978-3-8291-2087-6), Krauss voiced a bartender.

In 2007, Krauss recorded two books by Dirk Bernemann as audio books for UBooks-Verlag. He has also played Opi Kopi in the audio play series Elea Eluanda since the beginning and has been involved in many ways with the audio play label Hörplanet. In Bernhard Hennen's audio play series The Elves, Krauss took on the role of the master builder Guido from episode 9 in 2014.

Krauss was also heard in several Lady Bedfort radio plays, such as Lady Bedfort and the Captain's Chest and Lady Bedfort and the Deception on the Train.

=== Private life ===
Krauss was married twice and left behind three children and three grandchildren. He lived in the Lengde district of Goslar from 1978 until his death and also had temporary residences in Berlin and Mallorca. Krauss died on August 26, 2019, at the age of 78 in Goslar. His urn grave is located in the anonymous grave field in the cemetery in Lengde. In 2020, a public bookcase in Lengde was redesigned in his memory.

=== After his death ===
In 2023, Nintendo used his voice lines of The Legend of Zelda: Breath of the Wilds The Great Deku Tree for The Legend of Zelda: Tears of the Kingdom.

Five years after his death, Helmut Krauss was brought back to life as an AI-generated character in Eric Hordes' music video Eric Hah: Graf Drakula. With the express consent of his heirs, the director was authorized to use the appearance and voice of Helmut Krauss in this production and future film projects in order to preserve his artistic legacy using cutting-edge technology.

== Works (excerpt) ==
=== Voice Actor ===
David McCharen

- 1990: Teenage Mutant Ninja Turtles Turtles as Shredder/Oroku Saki
- 1991: Turtles II – Das Geheimnis des Ooze as Shredder/Oroku Saki & Super-Shredder

Paul Winfield

- 1972: Das Jahr ohne Vater as Nathan Lee Morgan
- 1987: Guilty of Innocence: The Lenell Geter Story as George Hairston
- 1990: 83 Stunden – Nervenkrieg gegen die Zeit as Dr. Dantley

Bill Cobbs

- 1995: Rettet das Tal der Zauberbären! as Caleb
- 1997: Air Bud as Arthur Chaney
- 1998:I Still Know What You Did Last Summer as Estes, der Voodoopriester

Charles S. Dutton

- 1993: Menace II Society as Mr. Butler
- 1995: Nick of Time as Huey
- 1996: Bittersüße Küsse as Howlin' Wolf
- 2000: Die Jazz Connection as Dizzy Gillespie

Yaphet Kotto

- 1978: Blue Collar as Smokey
- 1979: Alien as Parker
- 1983: The Star Chamber as Det. Harry Lowes
- 1987: The Running Man as William Laughlin
- 1988: Midnight Run – Fünf Tage bis Mitternacht as FBI Agent Alonzo Mosely

John Goodman

- 1990: Arachnophobia as Delbert McClintock
- 1994: The Flintstones as Fred Flintstone
- 1997: The Borrowers as Ocious P. Potter
- 1998: The Big Lebowski as Walter Sobchak
- 2008: Gigantic as Al Lolly

James Earl Jones

- 1987: Pinocchio und der Herrscher der Nacht as Herrscher der Nacht
- 1989: Three Fugitives as Dugan
- 1991: Verdammte des Südens as Ben Johnson
- 1994: Clean Slate as John Dolby
- 1996: A Family Thing – Brüder wider Willen as Ray Murdock
- 1999: Summer's End as Dr. William "Bill" Blakely

Marlon Brando

- 1990: Freshman als Carmine Sabatini / Jimmy der Tukan
- 1992: Christopher Columbus: The Discovery as Tomas de Torquemada
- 1995: Don Juan DeMarco as Dr. Jack Mickler/ "Don Octavio del Flores"
- 1997: The Brave as McCarthy
- 1998: Free Money as Warden Sven "Der Schwede" Sorenson
- 2001: The Score als Max
- 2008: The Godfather as Don Vito Corleone

John Ingle

- 1994 - 2007:Land before Time movies as Ceras Dad (Dreihorn)

==== Movies ====
- 1982: Rocky III – Mr. T as James "Clubber" Lang
- 1985: The Purple Rose of Cairo – Danny Aiello as Monk
- 1985: Rocky IV – Dolph Lundgren as Ivan Drago
- 1987: Hellraiser – Das Tor zur Hölle – Doug Bradley as Pinhead
- 1987: Predator – Jesse Ventura as Blain
- 1990: The Rescuers Down Under – George C. Scott as Percival C. McLeach
- 1991: Hot Shots! – Rino Thunder as Owatonna
- 1992: The Jacksons: An American Dream – Lawrence Hilton Jacobs as Joseph Jackson
- 1992: Karambolage (1963) – Mademoiselle Andréa
- 1994: Däumeline – Joe Lynch as Grundel
- 1994: Pulp Fiction – Samuel L. Jackson as Jules Winnfield
- 1995: Casper – Brad Garrett as Fatso
- 1996: Mars Attacks! – Jim Brown as Byron Williams
- 1997: Bean – Der ultimative Katastrophenfilm – Richard Gant as Lt. Brutus
- 1997: Casper: A Spirited Beginning – Jess Harnell as Fatso
- 1997: The Lost World: Jurassic Park– Jim Harley as Hafenmeister
- 2000: Thomas, die fantastische Lokomotive – Neil Crone as Diesel 10
- 2001: Monsters Inc – James Coburn as Waternoose
- 2004: Der Wixxer as Neighbour (Intro–Voice)
- 2007: Neues vom Wixxer ass Neighbour (Intro–Voice)
- 2008: Escaflowne – The Movie – Chafurin as Maulwurfmann
- 2010: Mary & Max – oder: Schrumpfen Schafe, wenn es regnet? – Philip Seymour Hoffman as Max
- 2010: Marmaduke – Sam Elliott as Chupadogra
- 2014: Earthlings – Joaquin Phoenix as Narorator
- 2014: Leprechaun: Origins – Gary Peterman as Hamish
- 2016: Land before Time XIV – George Ball as Ceras Vater (Dreihorn)

==== Series ====
- 1961–1966: Mr. Ed – Allan Lane as Mr. Ed
- 1980–1982: Captain Future – Tarō Jin as Narrator
- 1989–1998: Family Matters – Reginald VelJohnson as Carl Winslow
- 1990–1996: Prince of Bel Air – James Avery as Philip Banks
- 1993–1999: The X-Files – Jerry Hardin as "Mann mit der tiefen Stimme" (Deep Throat)
- 1994: Aaahh!!! Real Monsters – Gregg Berger as Grummler
- 1995: Lady Oscar – Yoshito Yasuhara as Ludwig XV.
- 1996: Frasier – Harris Yulin as Jerome Belasco
- 1997–2000: Superman – Die Zeichentrickserie – Michael Ironside as Lord Darkseid
- 1999–2001: Unten am Fluss – Nigel Pegram as General Woundwort (Staffel 3)
- 2000–2002: Fix & Foxi and Friends – John Stocker as Uncle Fax
- 2000–2004: Yu-Gi-Oh! – Atsushi Kondou as Odion
- 2001: Donkey Kongs Adventure as King Kroko
- 2005: Desperate Housewives – Jon Polito als Charles Skouras
- 2009–2013: The Penguins of Madagascar – Kevin Michael Richardson as Maurice
- 2015: Heidi as Ernst Meier (Grandpa)

==== Videogames ====
- 1996: Toonstruck as Mal Block
- 1999: Shadow Man as Mike LeRoi
- 2002: Mafia: City of Lost Heaven as Don Ennio Salieri
- 2006: The Godfather als Don Vito Corleone
- 2009: Assassin's Creed II as Mario
- 2010: Assassin's Creed: Brotherhood as Mario
- 2012: World of Warcraft: Mists of Pandaria as Chen Sturmbräu
- 2012: Call of Duty: Black Ops II as Admiral Briggs
- 2014: Final Fantasy XIV: A Realm Reborn als Eynzahr Slafyrsyn
- 2015: Fallout 4
- 2015: League of Legends as Tahm Kench
- 2017: The Legend of Zelda: Breath of the Wild as Great Deku Tree
- 2023: The Legend of Zelda: Tears of the Kingdom as Great Deku Tree

=== Audiobooks & Radioplays ===
- 1992: Friedrich Gorenstein: Streit um Dostojewski – Director: Walter Niklaus (SFB/DS Kultur)
- 2003: Chourmo – Autor: Jean-Claude Izzo – Director: Ulrich Gerhardt
- Offenbarung 23 as narrator
- Emily Laing, ninety-hour audio book series by Christoph Marzi
- Elea Eluanda as Opi Kopi
- Necroscope vol. 2, Vampirblut by Brian Lumley
- Enzo, die Kunst ein Mensch zu sein by Garth Stein
- Sacred as narrator
- Gabriel Burns, Episode: Die Fänge des Windes, Grenzgebiet, Nebelsee
- Dirk Bernemann, Ich habe die Unschuld kotzen sehen/ – Und wir scheitern immer schöner
- Das Rad der Zeit by Robert Jordan (Audiobooks, Audible)
- Geisterjäger John Sinclair as Vampiro del Mar
- Die Schatzinsel as Billy Bones, Direction and editing: Thomas Tippner
- Norbert Nackendick. Der Audio Verlag (DAV), Berlin, 2009, ISBN 978-3-89813-870-3 (Lesung, 1 CD, 65 Min.)
- Die Satanische Bibel. Index/Promedia Wittlich, 2007, ISBN 978-3-936878-06-6 (5 Audio CDs)
- Punchdrunk von Sven Heuchert, Wortpersonal/M!Music St. Augustin 2. Auflage 2016, ISBN 978-3-945273-07-4 [Audiobook, 1 CD, 95 min]
- Der letzte Krieger by David Falk (Audiobook, Audible exclusive)
- Eine Weihnachtsgeschichte by Charles Dickens (Audiobook, Audible exclusive)
- Gruselkabinett, Episodes: 97/98 (Madame Mandilips Puppen), 101 (Verlorene Herzen)

=== Live-Radioplays ===
- 2002–2003: Die drei ???: Master Of Chess as Narrator
- 2009: Die drei ??? und der seltsame Wecker: Live and Ticking as Narrator
- 2014–2015: Phonophobia – Sinfonie der Angst
- 2015: Pre fiction, as Jules Winnfield

=== as an actor ===
- 1976: Hans im Glück
- 1979: Tatort – Ein Schuß zuviel
- 1981–2020: Löwenzahn
- 1982: Drei Damen vom Grill (Season 3, Episode 3 – Auf Probe)
- 1983: Plem, Plem – Die Schule brennt
- 1984: Mord mit der Schere
- 1985: Ein Heim für Tiere (TV series, 1 Episode)
- 1988: Zum Beispiel Otto Spalt
- 1993: Der Hausgeist (TV series, 1 Episode)
- 1996: Atemlos durch die Nacht (TV movie)
- 1998: Lindenstraße (TV series, 2 Episoden)
- 2001: Goebbels und Geduldig (TV movie by Kai Wessel)
- 2005: Löwenzahn – Die Reise ins Abenteuer (TV movie)
- 2005: Pastewka (1 Episode) (TV series)
- 2006: Vineta
- 2011: Pentito (shortfilm)
- 2011: Löwenzahn – Das Kinoabenteuer
- 2011: Tatort Berlin (1 Episode)
- 2012: Der Gründer
- 2015: Schmidts Katze (Shortfilm)
- 2017: Los Veganeros 2
- 2018: Alice – The Darkest Hour
- 2019: Patchwork Gangsta (TV series, 2 Episodes)
- 2019: Under ConTroll – Possessed by a Monster
