= Der Gründer =

2012 German film directed by Eric Dean Hordes

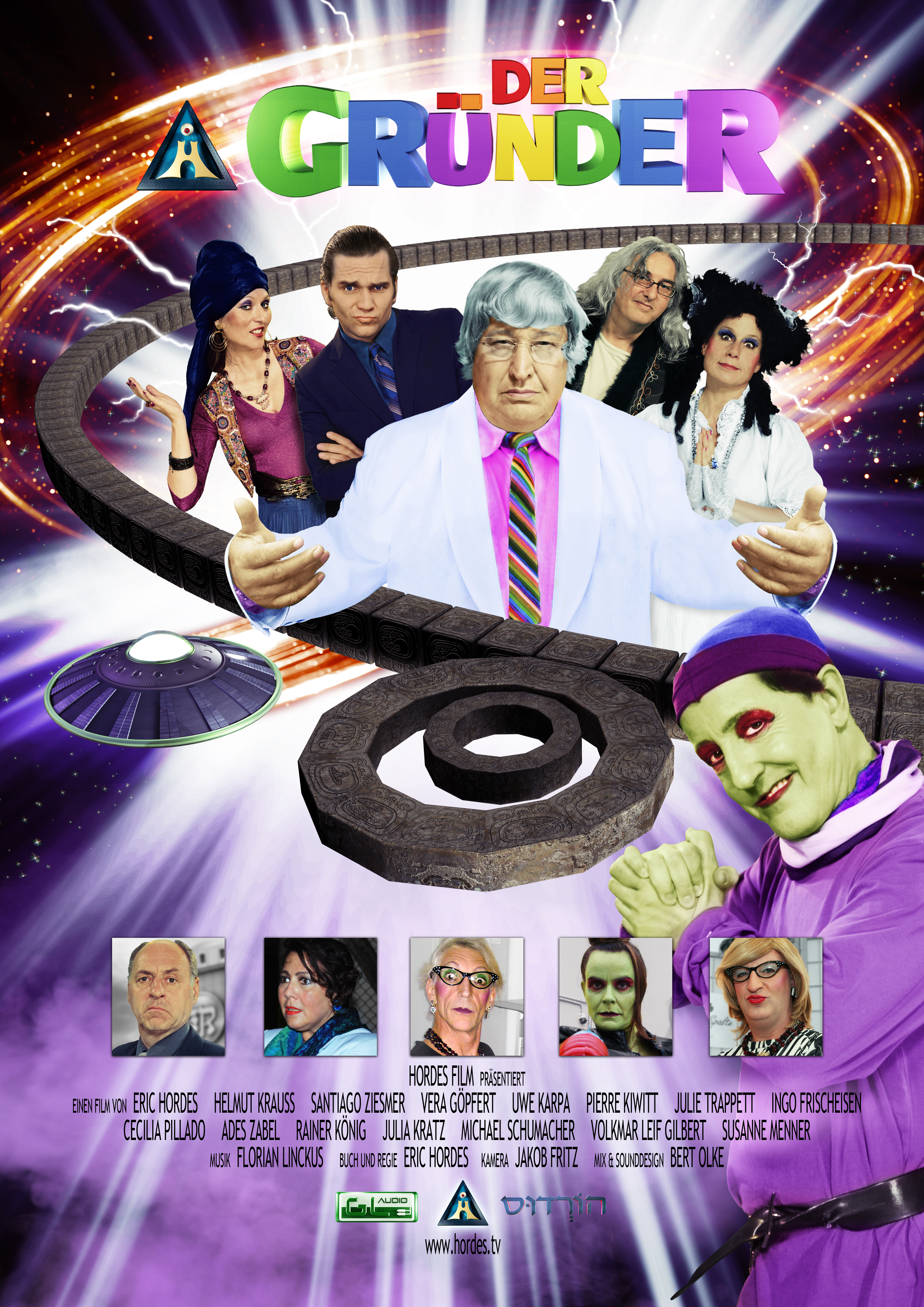
- German release poster
- Directed by: Eric Hordes
- Screenplay by: Eric Hordes
- Produced by: Eric Hordes
- Starring: Helmut Krauss; Vera Göpfert; Uwe Karpa; Santiago Ziesmer; Pierre Kiwitt
- Cinematography: Hanno Lentz
- Edited by: Eric Hordes
- Music by: Florian Linckus
- Distributed by: Hordes Film
- Release date: 21 December 2012 (Germany)
- Running time: 110 minutes
- Country: Germany
- Language: German

Der Gründer (The Founder) is a 2012 German satirical trash comedy film and the directorial debut of Eric Hordes. The work had its premiere on 21 December 2012 as a “doomsday premiere” in Berlin’s Kino Babylon. The film was released by Turbine Media Group on DVD and on streaming on Amazon Prime Video. The film parodies the story of Thomas G. Hornauer, creator of Kanal Telemedial, who creates a sect with the help of an alien.

== Plot ==
One night, the porn producer Gerhard Hornbacher discovers Torok, an alien from the planet Antoria, on his roof, who has landed there with his flying saucer. Hornbacher is able to overpower the alien and gains power over its beam and shape-shifting technology, from which he hopes to gain enormous wealth. But instead of directly using the omnipotence of the extraterrestrial devices, Hornbacher chooses a more complex path. As a “founder” he opens the spiritual television channel Kanal Teleportal together with his porn team. The founder takes the end of the world prophesied by the Mayan calendar in 2012 as an opportunity to grant 144,000 people refuge on the planet Antoria for a fee. The founder receives support from the porn actress Angella Atoma, who now poses as God's mouthpiece Guriella. Kanal Teleportal turns out to be a big loss for Hornbacher. This leads him to use the shapeshifter and thus abuse the face of God as a money collector. Finally the cash register rings and Hornbacher sees himself as a multimillionaire in Thailand, if only it wasn't for the Antorians' Plan 9.

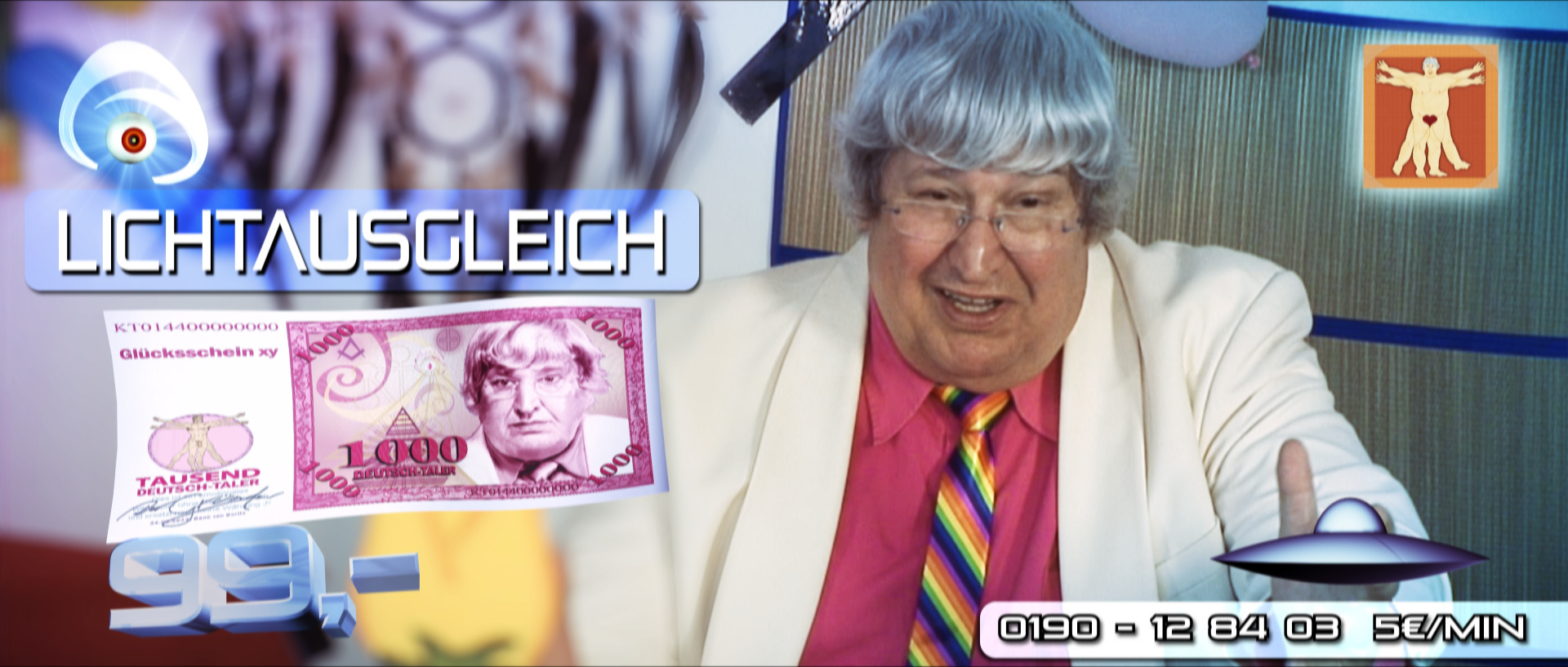
Helmut Krauss as Thomas G. Hornbacher

== Cast ==
- Helmut Krauss as Gerhard Hornbacher
- Vera Göpfert as Angella Atoma
- Uwe Karpa as Glenny Rosenberg
- Santiago Ziesmer as Torok
- Pierre Kiwitt as Tobias Hornbacher
- Julie Trappett as Belana Hodžić
- Ingo Frischeisen as Ingo Ingold
- Cecilia Pillado as Simonetta Paternostro
- Ades Zabel as Gina Gaydt
- Rainer König as Jesus Christ
- Julia Kratz as She-Borg
- Michael Schumacher as Esak DeVito
- Eric Hordes as a prophesiser
- Volkmar Leif Gilbert as Justin
- Britta Seling as a demon
- Wolfgang Völz as God

== Production ==
In June 2008, Hordes visited the television station Kanal Telemedial together with the singer Jennah Karthes during a live broadcast. Out of enthusiasm, he then wrote a script for a trash film over two days and then shot it.

Helmut Krauss was so fascinated by the script that he co-produced the film.

The film not only satirizes Hornauer, but also caricatures the cult leader Uriella and other television formats such as Astro TV. The stylistic device used is effects that are reminiscent of the science fiction B movies of the 1950s.

One of these effects is the complete dubbing in post-production, whereby some actors were dubbed by voice actors such as Wolfgang Völz, Marianne Groß or Eberhard Prüter.

The actor Ingo Frischeisen worked as a presenter and musician on Telemedial's television programs. He parodies himself in the film as Ingo Ingold.

The drag artist Ades Zabel, as gossip reporter Gina Gaydt, parodies BILD editor Tina Gaedt, who always reports on Hornauer's escapades.

Actor Helmut Krauss commented on Bettina Tietjen's show Das! on May 11, 2011. as follows about the founder film: “[…] he made a script out of it about a television man who also exists, but who no longer has a channel. It used to be called Kanal Telemedial.”

Under the title “The King of TikTok”, WDR produced an eight-part podcast series about Thomas G. Hornauer with the support of SWR. In the fourth and fifth episodes of this series, an interview with Eric Hordes explains how Hornauer inspired him to make the founder film. Hordes reports that Hornauer then threatened him not to make the film, although this appears to have been purely a publicity stunt.

== Telemedial court case ==
Due to Thomas Hornauer's fame, the film gained a certain amount of media interest during its development phase. Hornauer made several negative comments about the film project during his live broadcasts; he suspected that his telemedia idea was being mocked. The Stuttgart Regional Court granted Hornauer the right to watch the film twice within two weeks before its cinema premiere and to object to passages that violated his personal honor. After the first appointment, Hornauer informed Hordes by email that he could not be identified and that he saw further steps as a “waste of time and money”. The film was then released.

== Reception ==
Thomas Hornauer himself criticised the film, claiming that neither "his genius" nor "his purity" were reflected. Fernsehkritik.TV called it “Wonderfully crazy! Nice satire on the daily TV madness!” and DeutschMarkt described it as “a collection of wonderfully strange actions”.

== Lichtschiffe über Europa short film ==
During the research for the film, the trash short film Lichtschiffe über Europa (Lightships over Europe, 38 minutes) was created, which was released as a bonus film on the DVD in 2013.

In it, a German-speaking hermit (Johannes Sisko), who calls himself "The Founder", prophesies a holy salvation for several thousand earthlings through a light ship from space. Since meteorite impacts are getting closer, he beams his quirky daughter "Little White Cloud" (Vera Göpfert) to the silver UFO. However, she was presumably intercepted by a bearded guy named "Jesus Charly" (Karl Danguillier) and is now staying with him on a farm in Bavaria. Despite the displeasure over this circumstance, "The Founder" continues to solicit financial donations for the salvation of the Chosen Earthlings.
