= Marseilles Trilogy =

Marseilles Trilogy may refer to:

- The Trilogie marseillaise [Marseilles Trilogy], three plays and their film adaptations written by Marcel Pagnol
- Three neo-noir crime novels by Jean-Claude Izzo
