= Solea =

Solea may refer to:

- Solea, a simple sandal with a thong between the toes and a hobnailed sole from Roman times
- Soleá, a form of Flamenco music
- Solea (novel) by Jean-Claude Izzo
- Soléa, a public transit system in the French city of Mulhouse
- Solea (plant), a plant genus now considered a synonym of Viola
- Solea (fish), a genus of fishes
- Soleá (singer) (born 2011), Spanish singer who represented Spain in the Junior Eurovision Song Contest 2020
- Soleares (poetry collection), a 1933 book by J. Slauerhoff

== See also ==
- Soleas
