= Sidonie von Krosigk =

German actress (born 1989)

Sidonie von Krosigk (born 21 October 1989 in Munich) is a German actress.

== Life ==
In 1997 von Krosigk appeared in front of the camera for the first time at the age of seven in Die Rache der Carola Waas. Her first leading role followed a year later in Verschwinde von hier. This was followed by further episodic roles in television series. She became famous in 2002 in her role as the witch Bibi Blocksberg in the movie of the same name. For her portrayal of Bibi Blocksberg, von Krosigk won the Children's Media Award for Best Young Actress. In 2004, she was the leading actress in the sequel Bibi Blocksberg and the Secret of the Blue Owls. She then played other leading roles in television films such as Pik & Amadeus - Freunde wider Willen (2006). She also worked as a dubbing actress, including as the voice actress for the lead role of Chihiro in the German dub of Spirited Away. From the summer semester of 2010, she studied acting at the Hochschule für Musik und Darstellende Kunst in Frankfurt am Main.

For the 2014/2015 season, von Krosigk took on her first permanent engagement at the Theater Ulm. One of her first roles was that of Luise Miller in Schiller's Kabale und Liebe.

In 2022, she took on the lead role in Veronika Hafner's award-winning short film Unter der Welle. For her performance as Louise, she received a nomination in the category Best Young Actress at the Filmfestival Max Ophüls Preis 2022. Since the end of March 2023, she can be seen in the ZDF crime series The Old Fox in the role of a pathologist.

Von Krosigk has been married to a doctor since 2016.

She comes from the noble family Krosigk.

== Filmography ==
- 1999: Die Rache der Carola Waas
- 1999: Verschwinde von hier
- 2000: Anwalt Abel - "Das Geheimnis der Zeugin"
- 2000: Autsch, Du Fröhliche
- 2002: Bibi Blocksberg
- 2002: Was ist bloß mit meinen Männern los?
- 2003: Unsre Mutter ist halt anders
- 2004: Bibi Blocksberg und das Geheimnis der blauen Eulen
- 2005: Edel & Starck (season 4, episode 5: "Adel verpflichtet")
- 2006: Väter, denn sie wissen nicht was sich tut
- 2006: Pik & Amadeus - Freunde wider Willen
- 2008: Der Froschkönig (ARD fairy tale film series Sechs auf einen Streich)
- 2009: Dr. Hope - Eine Frau gibt nicht auf
- 2011: Für immer 30
- 2012: Der Alte - "Die Stunde des Jägers"
- 2018: Die Bergretter - "Das Glück ist ein Schmetterling"
- 2018: Um Himmels Willen - "Nachtgestalten"
- 2018: Sturm der Liebe
- 2019: Bettys Diagnose (season 6, episode 21: "Träume")
- 2020: Frühling - Keine Angst vorm Leben
- 2022: Unter der Welle (short film)
- 2022: Watzmann ermittelt (season 3, episode 3: "Two Fathers")
- since 2023: The Old Fox

== Voice actress ==
- 2002: Chihiros Reise ins Zauberland as Chihiro (leading role)
- 2005: Heidi as Klara
