= In the Sea There are Crocodiles =

2010 novel by Fabio Geda

In the Sea There are Crocodiles (Italian: Nel mare ci sono i coccodrilli) is a 2010 novel and the third book by Fabio Geda. It is loosely based on the life of Afghan refugee Enaiatollah Akbari and is taken from a series of interviews Geda conducted with Akbari. The novel follows Akbari from his birth in Afghanistan to his arrival in Italy.

The book's release in the United States and Great Britain marks it as the first of Geda's works to be translated into English. Amnesty International UK has also recommended the book as a way to teach human rights to children.

== Publication history ==
In the Sea There are Crocodiles was first published in Italy on April 22, 2010 through Milan, Baldini & Castoldi. An English language translation was released the following year through Doubleday, translated by Howard Curtis. This marked the first time that one of Geda's books had been published in English. It was released alongside an e-book edition and an audiobook adaptation narrated by Mir Waiss Najibi, issued through Books on Tape.

== Reception ==
In the Sea There are Crocodiles has received reviews from the Independent and the Guardian, the latter of which stated that it was a "frank, revealing and clear-eyed testament of the experiences faced by a young asylum-seeker in the contemporary world". Joseph Peschel of the Boston Globe had both praise and criticism for the book, stating that it was "an intriguing story, but absent from it is any deep, convincing sense of how Enaiat feels about the events that befall him."
