= Andrej Longo =

Italian author

Andrej Longo (born Ischia, 1959) is an Italian writer, playwright and pizzaiolo. He is a winner of the Bagutta Prize for literature.

== Life ==
Andrej Longo was born in Ischia, Italy. His name was given in tribute to Leo Tolstoy's War and Peace.

Longo obtained an undergraduate degree in Hotel Management, and followed it up with a master's degree in literature from the University of Bologna's Faculty of Arts, Music and Theatre.

== Career and recognition ==
After early work as a lifeguard, competitive chess player, surfing instructor and waiter, Longo began to write for the stage, radio and film.

He co-wrote the script for Lina Wertmüller's film Io speriamo che me la cave, with whom he published in 1992 a volume containing two stories: Prima o poi tornerò was his contribution, while Alì Babà was written by the director.

In 2000, he translated and adapted for the stage Choderlos de Laclos' Dangerous Liaisons, which was directed by Pierpaolo Sepe. His play La luce dei lampioni was staged by Imogen Kusch at the Villagio Teatro Umbria Festival 2000.

In 2002, the publisher Meridiano Zero published his collection of short stories, Più o meno alle tre. The following year, he published his first novel Adelante, which won the fiction section of the National Literary Prize of Pisa.

In 2004, Longo contributed to the project Bloody Europe!, a collection of short stories on homosexual themes.

In 2007, Longo published Dieci, a collection of short stories set in Naples with themes based on the Ten Commandments. The work won the Bagutta Prize, the National Literary Prize of Bergamo, and the Piero Chiara Prize. The translation into English by Howard Curtis, titled Ten, was long-listed for the Independent Foreign Fiction Prize in 2014.

In parallel with his writing, Longo has continued to work for the theatre. He adapted his work Più o meno alle tre, which was directed by Emanuela Giordano and staged by the Roman group Cometa Off in 2003. His earlier works Chi ha ucciso Sarah (1998) and Un pensiero per Olga (1999) can be cited, as well as Falene which debuted in Naples in 2004 under the direction of Marcello Cotugno.

Realising that his literary work alone could not provide a livelihood, he started to work as a pizza maker, which became an alternative career.

== Bibliography ==
- Prima o poi tornerò (1992), published by Guida (with Lina Wertmüller)
- Più o meno alle tre (2002), published by Meridiano Zero
- Adelante (2003), published by Rizzoli
- Dieci (2007), published by Adelphi; English translation Ten, tr. Howard Curtis, Harvill Secker, 2013.
- Chi ha ucciso Sarah? (2009), published by Adelphi
- Lu campo di girasoli (2011), published by Adelphi
- L' altra madre (2016), published by Adelphi
- Solo la pioggia (2021), published by Palermo
- Mille giorni che non vieni (2022), published by Palermo
- La forma dei sogni (2023), published by Palermo
