= Return to the Dark Valley =

2017 novel by Santiago Gamboa

- First edition (Spanish)
- Author: Santiago Gamboa
- Translator: Howard Curtis
- Language: Spanish
- Genre: Mystery novel, literary fiction
- Published: 2017 (Europa Editions) (Spanish, 2016, Literatura Random House)
- Publication place: Colombia
- English publication date: 2017
- Media type: Print
- Pages: 461
- ISBN: 978-1-60945-425-8
- Preceded by: Night Prayers

Volver al Valle Oscuro, or Return to the Dark Valley, is a novel written by Santiago Gamboa and published in 2016 that follows the stories of five separate characters in a modern world filled with turmoil. The novel's action takes place over several countries, including France, Spain, England, and Colombia and focuses on themes such as violence, sex, and domestic turmoil, contrasting them with the themes of forgiveness and peace in post-war Colombia. Return to the Dark Valley follows the story of Manuela Beltran, a young female poet with a scarred emotional past; a former diplomat and writer referred to by other characters as "Consul"; Tertullian, a Neo-Nazi revivalist from Argentina who is allegedly the son of the Pope; Ferdinand Palacio, a Colombian priest converted to rebel warrior; and the late Arthur Rimbaud, the celebrated French poet with a complicated personality and lifestyle. While each character's life seems altogether separate from the other, their stories eventually merge to create an overarching plot line that highlights the theme of reconciliation with the past.

== Plot ==
The novel is split into two parts and an epilogue. Part I ("Theory of Suffering Bodies" or "Figures Emerging from the Wreckage") serves the purpose of both introducing characters slowly as well as introducing the world in which the main plot takes place. When the Consul is speaking, the main plot is slowly revealed, but his narrative is broken up by Manuela's story told in a journal to her psychiatrist, Tertullian's expositions on his life, and the Consul's own biography on Arthur Rimbaud. In Part I, the reader is exposed to Manuela's dark history of sexual abuse and constant use of drugs and alcohol to numb her pain. As she progresses, she finds poetry as another escape from her past. Also found in Part I is Tertullian's eccentric narrative on his history which serves the purpose of persuading the Consul that he is in fact the son of the Pope and introducing the reader to his convoluted past. His narration also reveals his affinity for and mastery of torturing others and his history of schizophrenia. The Rimbaud biography gives an account of the well-known poet's ill-illumined life, from his early years to his death. His story serves as a constant, poetic theme that connects the stories of each of the other characters and adds another level of depth and richness to the story. As the Consul narrates the present, he begins in Rome, but he quickly receives a mysterious text from his old friend, Juana, that tells him to travel to Madrid and rent a hotel room while awaiting her arrival. So, he does so, and his story continues on in Spain. When he lands in Madrid, he discovers that the Boko Haram terrorist group has attacked the Irish embassy in Spain and is holding a large number of hostages. He becomes restless while awaiting Juana and keeping track of the hostage situation, so he finally goes out and explores the city, reminiscing on his past times of living and studying in the city. As he sits at a bar/restaurant, he observes a domestic dispute between what he perceives as two lovers engaging in an extra-marital affair, so he decides to step in to protect the woman. He is beaten severely by the man accompanying her, but after he manages to knock him out with an ashtray, the woman attacks him and renders him unconscious. He wakes upon in a hospital-prison hybrid, and after a short while, is joined in his room by Ferdinand Palacio, a former priest turned armed militant. Part I ends with the Consul narrating Palacio's life as he told it to him.

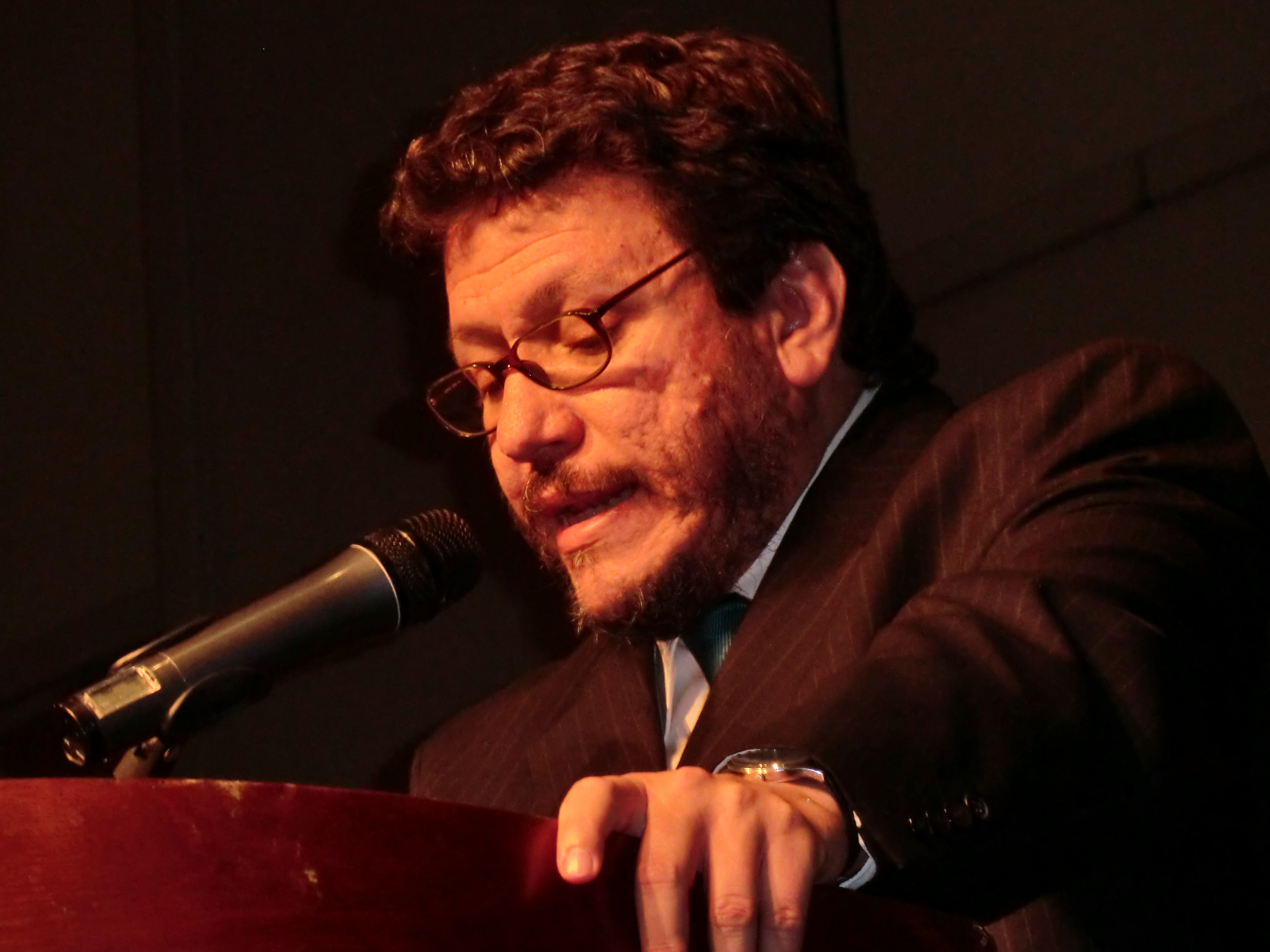
Author Santiago Gamboa in 2011

Part II ("Heading for the 5th Parallel" or "The Republic of Goodness") consists of a more fluid plot line that is only now interrupted by the continuing Rimbaud biography. The Consul discovers that the woman that he defended was none other than Manuela Beltrán, and after he is released from the hospital-prison, he returns to his hotel and is finally reunited with Juana. They depart from his hotel and travel to the apartment in which she has been staying with her son. Before long, the Consul reaches out to Manuela, and after they meet, Juana encourages him to invite her to the apartment, and the three become closer. Manuela reveals to them the journal for her psychiatrist, and after reading it, the Consul reflects upon his time in the hospital with Palacio. While doing so, he remembers the name of the man Palacio was after in Colombia, Freddy Otálora, and places him as the same man who had raped Manuela and killed her mother. He shares this with Manuela, and, desiring revenge, she asks for more information on Freddy, so Juana contacts a former acquaintance that owes her a debt to help them. The contact is none other than Tertullian, so after some quick reconnaissance, they discover that Freddy is still in Colombia. They quickly fly to Colombia and create a plan to give Manuela the chance to kill Freddy exactly as she's been longing to do. Juana then infiltrates a party, seduces Freddy, and creates the opportunity for Tertullian's men to extract him to another location. While Manuela cannot bring herself to torture or kill Freddy herself, she gives Tertullian permission to punish him, so Tertullian proceeds to mutilate Freddy, amputating several of his limbs and sprinkling acid on his face. Freddy lives and is found by the authorities, and Manuela, the Consul, Juana, and her son all fly back to Bogotá.

The epilogue depicts the four characters flying to Ethiopia and visiting Harar, the one place that Rimbaud had truly considered home.

== Characters ==
Manuela Beltran is a young college student from Santiago de Cali, Colombia, with a dark and twisted past. After being sexually assaulted at a young age by her mother's boyfriend and sent off to Catholic boarding school, Manuela witnesses and participates in drugs, alcohol, and sexual activities. While mostly a victim, she tells a lie to cover for one of her classmates in exchange for the other girl's family to pay for Manuela's secondary education. After serving time in reform school, Manuela graduates from high school and enrolls in literature courses at the Javierna in Bogotá. There she develops a love and gifted talent for writing poetry, eventually meeting the well-known poet Araceli Cielo. The two of them engage in an intimate romantic relationship until Araceli steals and plagiarizes Manuela's private poems, after which she moves to Spain and meets "Consul," one of the five major characters of the novel. After becoming friends, they, along with the help of others, devise a plan to avenge Manuela's past by killing Freddy Otalora, her mother's boyfriend who sexually assaulted her many years before. After traveling to Santiago de Cali, the team captures Freddy, and Manuela, while not killing him, is able to reconcile with her past.

"The Consul" is an ambiguous diplomat and writer who travels to Madrid, Spain, to meet up with a former acquaintance, Juana, after receiving an obscure note containing a meet-up location. He is in Madrid during a prominent terrorist attack on the Irish embassy and after a waiting few days decides to explore the city. During this exploration, Consul sees a young girl, Manuela Beltran, being abused by who appears to be a lover, at which point he steps in, stops the attack, and is injured in the process. He then wakes up in a prison cell where he meets Ferdinand Palacio, a priest who was involved as a rebel in the Colombian civil war and has a connection with Freddy Otalora. After being released from prison, Consul meets up with Juana and becomes friends with Manuela as well, eventually helping her locate Freddy Otalora and reconcile with her dark past. Whenever this character is narrating, the main plot of the story is being revealed. It is also worth noting that Juana and the Consul are both brought over from Gamboa's 2016 novel Night Prayers.

Tertullian is a mentally-ill, Argentinian Neo-Nazi supporter who claims to be the son of the Pope. He is found periodically throughout the novel describing his participation with this violent group, and because of his many years of experience, he is skilled with covert operations. Having a former connection with Consul's acquaintance, Juana, Tertullian is the mastermind behind the operation to kidnap and kill Freddy Otalora, playing a significant role in the climactic ending of the novel.

Ferdinand Palacio plays only a small role in the plot line; however, his testimony that he reveals to Consul ties each of the other characters' lives together. He was a priest in the town of Aguacatal and is imprisoned for his involvement with the Colombian paramilitaries during the civil war. While imprisoned, he reveals his story to Consul, and believing he was doing his duty to serve God and stop Communism, the priest played a role in guerrilla warfare and kidnapping of enemy soldiers. During this time, he knew Freddy Otalora, the man who assaulted Manuela as an adolescent. His testimony led Consul to connect the dots between Manuela and Freddy and to lead the team to his current location.

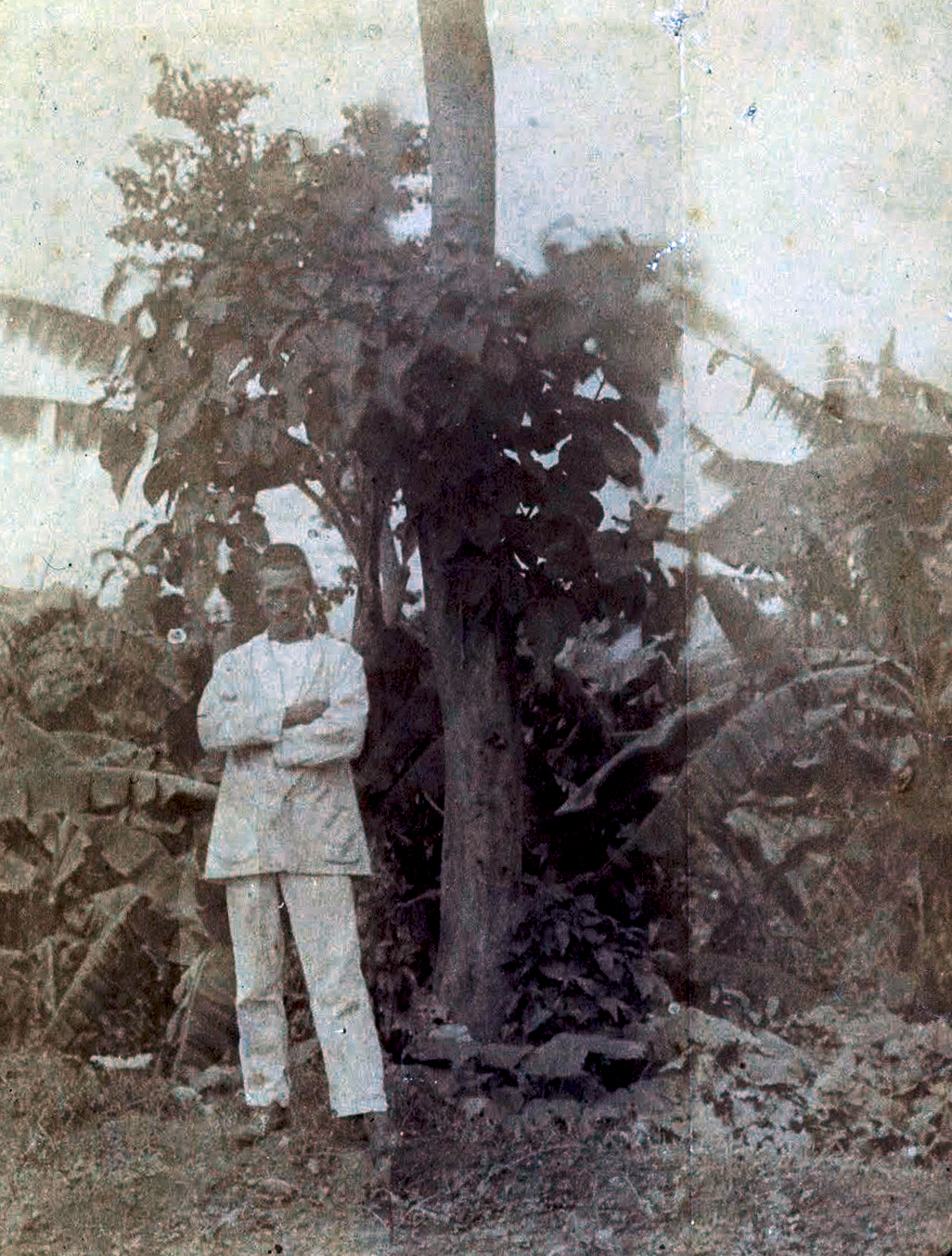
Rimbaud in Harar

Arthur Rimbaud was a 19th century French writer and poet known for his wild and unpredictable personality. His story is told periodically by the Consul throughout the novel from his teenage adolescent years all the way up to his death. From a young age, Rimbaud wrote many ground-breaking poems, mentored by Georges Izambard. It is during his teenage years that Rimbaud is believed to produce some of his best works. Rimbaud mustered hate for Charleville, the provincial town in which he was born, and made many different trips to wartime Paris to begin a new life but always found himself crawling back to his mother for support. Eventually, a prominent poet by the name of Paul Verlaine, captivated by Rimbaud's novel poetic style, sought out the young prodigy from Charleville, inviting him to his home in Paris. Verlaine and Rimbaud fell in love with each other, destroying Verlaine's family life; however, Rimbaud could never be satisfied staying in one place, so the two eventually parted. Rimbaud continued to write poetry, publishing works such as "A Season in Hell", which is referred to as his masterpiece. In the later years of his life, Rimbaud began traveling the world and working in various places, including Germany, the Dutch colonies known as the East Indies, Scandinavia, Egypt, Cyprus, and Harar in addition to learning seven languages. Rimbaud was happily settled in Harar, but when the British withdrew, he was forced to leave and soon concocted a failed business plan to sell weapons to a foreign king. Eventually, Rimbaud returned to Harar, where he spent the last years of his life. Before his death, Rimbaud was forced to have his leg amputated and move back to his mother's family farm. Rimbaud died of carcinoma on November 10, 1891, attempting to return to his home in the Middle East.

== Themes and topics ==
=== Violence ===
There are several themes and topics that form the connective tissue for this novel, and each is brought about in the stories of the main characters, or narrators. Violence is a theme inlaid in each character's story. Within the novel, there is a terrorist attack on the Irish embassy in Madrid, a vivid description of civilian killings during the Colombian civil war, and a description of domestic sexual assault as well as many other instances of brutality. Gamboa focuses heavily on violence politically, personally, and domestically.

=== Hate and Revenge ===
One prominent theme is that of the relationship between hate and revenge. Each prominent character has a dark past of sorts, but none is perhaps darker than Manuela's horrid, tragic story. A large plot line throughout the book is Manuela's quest for revenge against the man that sexually abused her and killed her mother. As the novel progresses, she meets the other main characters, and they seek to aid her in her dark quest for revenge. She is consumed by her hatred for him, but when she finally is able to face him and has the opportunity to exact revenge, she cannot bring herself to do what she has dreamt to do to him for so long: torture and kill him. Along her quest and within its consummation, the reader is exposed to the relationship between hate and revenge and the line that one has to cross to go from one to the other. Along this line, the nation of Colombia is in a state of conflicting violence and forgiveness throughout the novel. In certain aspects, as in Ferdinand Palacio's story, the nation is immensely divided by conflict; however, when Manuela, Consul, and Tertullian return to Colombia for revenge, the atmosphere is one of peace and reconciliation. In this, readers see the contrast between war and peace, of hatred and compassion.

=== Poetry ===
This novel also heavily emphasizes poetry. The Consul is also a writer, and he reflects throughout the novel on how poetry has shaped him and how fellow poets have enlightened him and impacted how he thinks and lives. Furthermore, the biographical strand of Rimbaud's life that flows throughout this book and holds it together is written by the Consul himself. Rimbaud also heavily influenced the Consul, but as Rimbaud's life is exposed and explained, Gamboa shows how much poetry and fellow poets also shaped his life and portrays Rimbaud's appreciation and passion for poetry. Rimbaud centered his life on his love for poetry, sometimes foregoing meals and safety just to experience the euphoria and release he experienced through others' writings along with his own. Finally, Manuela is able to briefly escape her dark past in the moments that she reads poetry. Consequently, her poetry is loved wherever she goes, although unfortunately, her former lover steals her poetry and publishes it as her own. She then seeks to escape from that influence all for the sake of freeing herself through the medium of poetry.

=== The Afterlife ===
Additionally, the afterlife is a theme minimally explored throughout the novel. Early on, Tertullian tells a confounding story regarding his take on the afterlife. When asked about this in an interview, Gamboa spoke of why he included Tertullian, the origin of the story on the afterlife and what religion meant to him as he wrote the novel. He states that he had Tertullian explore religion as a response to what he felt like life's most pressing question is: what's next?

== Possible film adaptations ==
As of 2020, there are talks among certain Los Angeles writers and filmmakers about making both Night Prayers and Return to the Dark Valley into cinematic works.
