= Santiago Ziesmer =

German actor

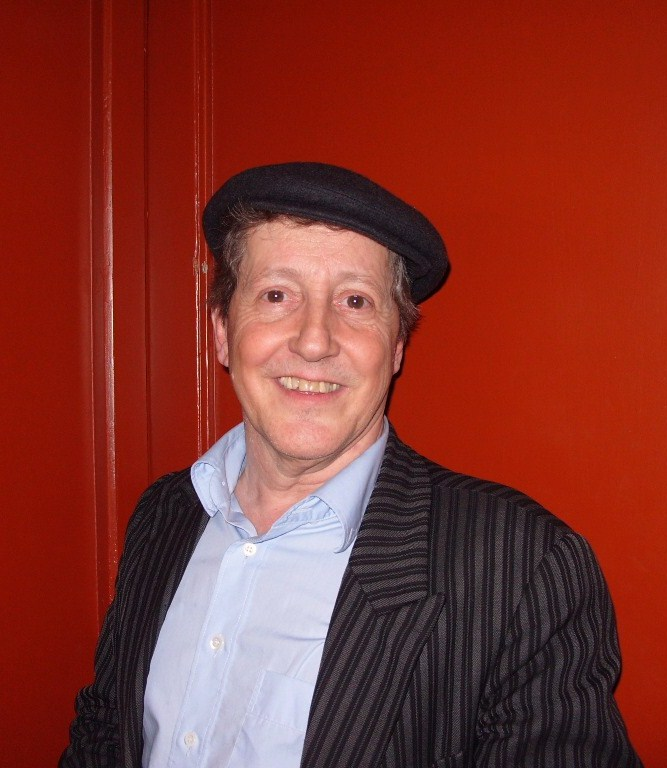
- Ziesmer in 2010
- Born: 25 July 1953 (age 73); Madrid, Spain
- Occupation: Actor
- Website: santiago-ziesmer.de

Santiago Ziesmer (born 25 July 1953) is a Spanish-born German actor.

== Career ==
Ziesmer trained in theater from 1972 to 1975 in the theater studio "Hanny Herter" in Berlin. Since 1973, he has regularly acted in theater. He has had a recurring role in the RTL Television series Hinter Gittern – Der Frauenknast.

Ziesmer is best known for dubbing over Jaleel White as Steve Urkel in Family Matters, Ren Höek in The Ren & Stimpy Show (alongside Oliver Feld's Stimpy), and SpongeBob SquarePants in the official German dub. He is also the unofficial German dub voice of Steve Buscemi having voiced him for a majority of his movies but as of yet not being hired to be the exclusive german voice for Buscemi, the dubover voice of Ted Schmidt in Queer as Folk, and the dubover voice of the Chris Rock character Pookie in the film New Jack City. He is the German voices of Wakko Warner from Animaniacs and Dale Gribble from King of the Hill. He has supplied his voice to a number of Disney productions, including the German dub of DuckTales as Dewey and the Winnie-the-Pooh series as Piglet, and Beauty and the Beast as LeFou. Ziesmer played a dual role in the popular Dragon Ball franchise as the first voice of Vegeta in Dragon Ball Z and Gil in Dragon Ball GT and he also voiced Monokuma in Danganronpa: The Animation.

== Voice acting roles (selection) ==
Steve Buscemi

- 1991: as Chet in Barton Fink (original dubbing)
- 1993–1999: as Gordon Pratt in Homicide: Life on the Street (season 3, Das Spiel ist aus)
- 1994–2009: as Art Masterson in Emergency Room – Die Notaufnahme (season 14, episode 19)
- 1996: as Map to the Stars Eddie in Flucht aus L.A.
- 1997: as Garland Greene in Con Air
- 1998: as Rockhound in Armageddon – Das jüngste Gericht
- 2001: as Ray Coleman in Domestic Disturbance
- 2002: as Romero in Spy Kids 2 – Die Rückkehr der Superspione
- 2003: as Romero in Mission 3D
- 2005: as McCord in Die Insel
- 2006: as Les Galantine in Blitzlichtgewitter (dubbing: 2011)
- 2006–2013: as Lenny Wosniak in 30 Rock
- 2007: as Clinton Fitzer in Chuck und Larry – Wie Feuer und Flamme
- 2009: as Frank in Rage
- 2009: as George Twisp in Youth in Revolt (dubbing: 2012)
- 2010: as Wiley in Kindsköpfe
- 2011: as Bill Blago in Rampart – Cop außer Kontrolle
- 2012: as Mitfahrgelegenheit in On the Road – Unterwegs
- 2013: as Wiley in Kindsköpfe 2
- 2013: as Anton Marvelton in Der unglaubliche Burt Wonderstone
- 2014: as Jimmy in Cobbler – Der Schuhmagier
- 2017: as Nikita Chruschtschow in The Death of Stalin
- 2017: as Del Montgomery in Lean on Pete
- since 2019: as God in Miracle Workers
- 2019: as Farmer Frank Miller in The Dead Don't Die
- 2025: as Barry Dort in Wednesday

Tom Kenny

- since 1999: as SpongeBob SquarePants in SpongeBob SquarePants
- since 1999: as Opa Schwammkopf in SpongeBob Schwammkopf (season 3, Der fliegende Schwamm)
- since 1999: as Enkel von SpongeBob in SpongeBob Schwammkopf (season 7, Das große Zugabenteuer)
- 2003: as Alien #1 in Scary Movie 3
- 2004: as SpongeBob Schwammkopf in Der SpongeBob Schwammkopf Film
- 2008–2011: as Bingo in True Jackson (season 2, episode 10 & 13)
- 2009: as Kronecker in Cosmic Quantum Ray
- 2015: als SpongeBob Schwammkopf in SpongeBob Schwammkopf 3D *2021: as SpongeBob SquarePants
- 2020: als SpongeBob Schwammkopf in SpongeBob Schwammkopf: Eine Schwammtastische Rettung (credited as Santiago Ziesmer Girol)

Alec Mapa

- 1988: as Yasu Wade in Die grellen Lichter der Großstadt
- 1998: as Lana in Leben und lieben in L.A.
- 2004–2012: as Vern in Desperate Housewives (season 2–3)
- 2005–2010: as Bibliotheksangestellter in Numbers – Die Logik des Verbrechens (season 6, Alte Krieger)
- 2006–2010: as Suzuki St. Pierre in Ugly Betty
- 2011–2017: as Lawrence in 2 Broke Girls (season 5, episode 13)
- 2013–2016: as Jerry in Devious Maids – Schmutzige Geheimnisse (season 1, episode 1–3 & 13)
- 2013–2018: as Babybewerter in Die Thundermans (season 2, episode 24–25)
- since 2013: as Milo in Mom (season 3, episode 10)
- since 2014: as Jack Frittleman in Henry Danger
- since 2014: as Neil in Black-ish (season 3, episode 9)

John Fiedler

- 1977: as Ferkel in Die vielen Abenteuer von Winnie Puuh (dubbing: 1994)
- 1988–1991: as Ferkel in Neue Abenteuer mit Winnie Puuh (dubbing: 1995)
- 1997: as Ferkel in Winnie Puuh auf großer Reise
- 2000: as Ferkel in Tiggers großes Abenteuer
- 2001–2002: as Ferkel in Winnie Puuh's Bilderbuch
- 2001–2002: as Ferkel in Mickys Clubhaus
- 2002: as Ferkel in Winnie Puuh – Honigsüße Weihnachtszeit
- 2003: as Ferkel in Ferkels großes Abenteuer
- 2004: as Ferkel in Winnie Puuh – Spaß im Frühling
- 2005: as Ferkel in Heffalump – Ein neuer Freund für Winnie Puuh

Jaleel White

- 1989–1998: as Steve Urkel in Alle unter einem Dach
- 2000–2015: as Kenny Greene in CSI: Vegas (season 14, Leichtes Handgepäck)
- since 2003: as Martin Thomas in Navy CIS (season 9, episode 13)
- 2004–2008: as Kevin Givens in Boston Legal (season 3, episode 20)
- 2004–2012: as Porter in Dr. House (season 8, episode 1)
- 2006: as Künstleragent in Dreamgirls
- 2006–2014: as Tony in Psych (2 episoden)
- 2009–2016: as Mickey Franks in Castle (season 7, episode 22)

Tony Cox

- 1994: as Dwarf Guard in Das Schweigen der Hammel
- 2000: as Limofahrer in Ich, beide & sie
- 2006: as Hitch in Date Movie
- 2006–2014: as Tony Cox in Psych (season 5, episode 14)
- 2007: as Bink in Fantastic Movie
- 2010: as Eight-Ball in The Warrior's Way
- 2011: as Minoritees in 301 – Scheiß auf ein Empire (dubbing: 2014)

Conrad Vernon

- 2001: as Pfefferkuchenmann in Shrek – Der tollkühne Held
- 2003: as Pfefferkuchenmann in Shrek 4-D
- 2004: as Pfefferkuchenmann in Shrek 2 – Der tollkühne Held kehrt zurück
- 2007: as Pfefferkuchenmann in Shrek – Oh du Shrekliche
- 2007: as Pfefferkuchenmann in Shrek der Dritte
- 2010: as Pfefferkuchenmann in Für immer Shrek

Danny Woodburn

- 1990–1998: als Mickey in Seinfeld
- 1996–2000: als Joseph Calumbrito in Allein gegen die Zukunft (season 4, Menschenjagd)
- 2000: als Little Rocko in Die Flintstones in Viva Rock Vegas
- 2005–2017: als Alex Radswell in Bones – Die Knochenjägerin (season 2, episode 6)
- 2007–2012: als Mitch in iCarly (season 2, Ein Schrottbaum zu Weihnachten)
- 2012–2014: als Mr. Poulos in Crash & Bernstein

Anthony Michael Hall

- 1985: as Brian Ralph Johnson in The Breakfast Club
- 1985: as Gary Wallace in L.I.S.A. – Der helle Wahnsinn
- 1997: as Busfahrer in No Night Stand
- 1999: as Bill Gates in Die Silicon Valley Story

Verne Troyer

- 2002: as Attila in Hard Cash – Die Killer vom FBI
- 2003: as Verne Troyer in Pauly Shore is Dead
- 2008: as Coach Punch Cherkov in Der Love Guru
- 2009: as Percy in Das Kabinett des Doktor Parnassus

Travis Oates

- 2007: als Ferkel in Meine Freunde Tigger & Puuh
- 2011: als Ferkel in Winnie Puuh

Michael J. Anderson

- 1995: as Mr. Nutt in The X Files (season 2, episode 20)
- 2003–2005 as Samson in Carnivàle
- 2010: as Biggie in Cold Case (season 7, episode 14)

Rob Paulsen

Frank Welker

== Filmography (selection) ==
- 1963: Alle Loks pfeifen für Jan
- 1965: Das Schiff Esperanza
- 1967: Till, der Junge von nebenan
- 1967: Der falsche Prinz
- 1968: Saids Schicksale
- 1968: Mein Kapitän ist tot
- 1974: Auch ich war nur ein mittelmäßiger Schüler
- 1975: Mozart – Aufzeichnungen einer Jugend
- 1975: Ein neuer Start
- 1976: Aktion Grün
- 1978: Ein Mann will nach oben
- 1980: Sunday Children
- 1985: Drei Damen vom Grill
- 1986: Hals über Kopf – Vampire
- 1987: Praxis Bülowbogen
- 1989: Rivalen der Rennbahn
- 1994: Der Havelkaiser
- 1995: Frauenarzt Dr. Markus Merthin – Abschied
- 1998: Letzte Chance für Harry
- 1998–2001: Hinter Gittern – Der Frauenknast
- 2002: Schloss Einstein – episode 206
- 2005: Helena – Die anderen Leben
- 2008: H3 – Halloween Horror Hostel
- 2010: Konferenz der Tiere
- 2012: Der Gründer
- 2013: Planet USA
- 2013: Quiqueck & Hämat – Proll Out
- 2019: Patchwork Gangsta
- 2019: Under ConTroll: Possessed by a Monster

=== Shows (selection) ===
- 1991–1996: as Ren Hoek in The Ren & Stimpy Show
- 2012: as Porky Pig in The Looney Tunes Show
- 2016: as Clancee in Ninjago
- 2021: as Howard the Duck in What If...?
- 2021: as Heimerdinger in Arcane: League of Legends

=== Additional Voices ===
- 1992: Porco Rosso
- 1997–2006: Space Goofs
- 2017: Cars 3

== Video games (selection) ==
- 2009: as Jorge in The Book of Unwritten Tales
- 2010: as Marcusi/Verrückter Imker/Bosnickel in Drakensang: Am Fluss der Zeit
- 2014: as Aloys la Touche in Assassin's Creed Unity
- 2015: as Jorge/Papagei in The Book of Unwritten Tales 2
- 2015: as SpongeBob Schwammkopf (SpongeBob Heldenschwamm)
- 2016: as Narrator in Call of Duty: Infinite Warfare (Zombies in Spaceland)
- 2020: as Skippy in Cyberpunk 2077
