= Löwenzahn =

German children's television series

- Presented by: Peter Lustig (1981 - 2005); Guido Hammesfahr (2006- )
- Country of origin: Germany
- Original language: German
- No. of seasons: 44
- No. of episodes: 492

Original release
- Network: ZDF
- Release: 24 March 1981 – present

Löwenzahn ('Dandelion') is a children's television series produced and aired by German public broadcaster ZDF on German television. Originally conceived and hosted by Peter Lustig, the first episode aired on 7 January 1979, then titled Pusteblume. The first episode of the retitled series Löwenzahn aired on 24 March 1981. After Lustig's health-related retirement, the show was taken over by actor Guido Hammesfahr who has played the new host Fritz Fuchs since October 2006.

== Format ==
Each 24, formerly 30 minute episode is dedicated to a separate issue or theme and consists mainly of related short featurettes, which explain, explore and educate how things of everyday life and even complex systems work. It spans a wide variety of topics from technology and industry to something as mundane as how the postal service works.

Its central character (Peter Lustig as himself; later Guido Hammesfahr as 'Fritz Fuchs') is a handy and technophile middle-aged man with childlike curiosity, seeking an eco-friendly and self-sustaining lifestyle. Early in the series he moves from his city house to the outskirts of "Bärstadt" and into a blue caravan, which has become the shows landmark and a stable part of German popular culture. Peter manages to arrange his big lot of furniture from the house around the confined space of the caravan and finds some creative new ways to put them to use. The wardrobe is being transformed into an outside toilet room including a water flushing system and a glass cabinet is added to the cabin wall as a bay window. With a seating area that can be transformed into a bed by a pulley system and folding up furniture Peter manages to actually fit a sitting/dining area/bed, a small kitchen and a study area into the small camper. The bath tub however was placed outside. On top of the cabin he created a terrace which can be reached by stairs entirely made of chairs. The remodelling of his new home set the tone for the many DIY elements of upcoming episodes. However, Peter's adventurous and inquisitive nature also tends to get him into trouble throughout the series.

The most common side character is Herr Paschulke (Helmut Krauss). He is shown as the complete opposite of Peter: He has a conservative, fuddy-duddy lifestyle, is lazy and obese, eats mostly unhealthy food like pizza and burgers, doesn't do any sports, has no interest in a more environmentally friendly lifestyle and often mocks Peter's views and ideas. Nonetheless, they do get along greatly. Sometimes, Peter also manages to get Paschulke to do things he doesn't want to do, like climbing on a mountain in the Bavarian Alps.

== Trivia ==
Lustig (the actor) also lived in the caravan for major parts of the filming.

Many of the episodes with Lustig contained a song sung by Lustig about the main subject of the episode.

The show is set in the fictional city of "Bärstadt" (beartown), but most filming actually takes place in Berlin (the animal in Berlin's coat of arms is a bear), and people who know Berlin have recognized the locations used around the city. The reason why they chose the name Bärstadt is that Anne Voss, the creator of the show, lived in Bärstadt im Taunus.

The series has not only attracted children of all ages, it also found a wide adult audience, who have watched the series as children themselves and kept loyal to the format.

During Peter Lustig's era, every single episode ended with him urging his young viewers to turn off the TV, since “there's nothing else on today.”

== History ==
The series was originally called Pusteblume (coll. blowball/ dandelion clock) and was first broadcast on 7 January 1979. All episodes under the name of Pusteblume were shot in Munich and other parts of Bavaria, it is also where the character of Peter Lustig lived. The original production company, however, clashed with the public broadcasting station ZDF; the show was cancelled and restarted under a new name due to copyright issues. With "Löwenzahn" the title's original reference to the beautiful, adaptable, strong and ever-changing Dandelion was retained. The show's title sequence focuses on the flower's strengths as well, while one of Lustig's main messages to children was "there's no such thing as weeds", inviting them to see nature's vigorous beauty in all its lavish glory.

In the series itself the move was explained as that the airport entry lane for incoming airplanes was right above the house where Peter lived and in a bid to escape the constant noise he wanted to move, it was explained in the first episode of "Löwenzahn". With the help of his cousin "Trude" he considers several means of housing until they pass by a building company and Peter finds interest in an old wooden building site cabin, which he gets. Trude offers him to use a lot of land she uses as allotment in the town she lives, "Bärstadt", for placing the cabin.

Most episodes of Löwenzahn are shot in Berlin, where Peter's building site wagon stands, but some episodes, depending on the subject of the episode, were also shot at different places, e.g. an airport-themed episode was shot at Hannover Airport, a ship-themed episode was mostly shot aboard the Finnjet, and a volcano-themed episode was even shot at Lanzarote.

In 2005 Peter Lustig retired from his role as the main host of the show due to health issues. He was replaced by Guido Hammesfahr, under whom the basic format of the show was kept: Fritz Fuchs, the character Hamesfahr plays, still lives in the old wagon, but a few new side characters were added. These include his dog Keks (Cookie), his female friend Yasemin (Sanam Afrashteh) and the strict code enforcement officer Heinz Kluthe (Holger Handtke).

Since 1981, Helmut Krauss had played the role of the fuddy-duddy and clumsy, but good-hearted neighbour Hermann Paschulke, a role that was kept after the takeover by Hammesfahr until Krauss died in August 2019.
