= Santiago Gamboa =

Colombian writer (born 1965)

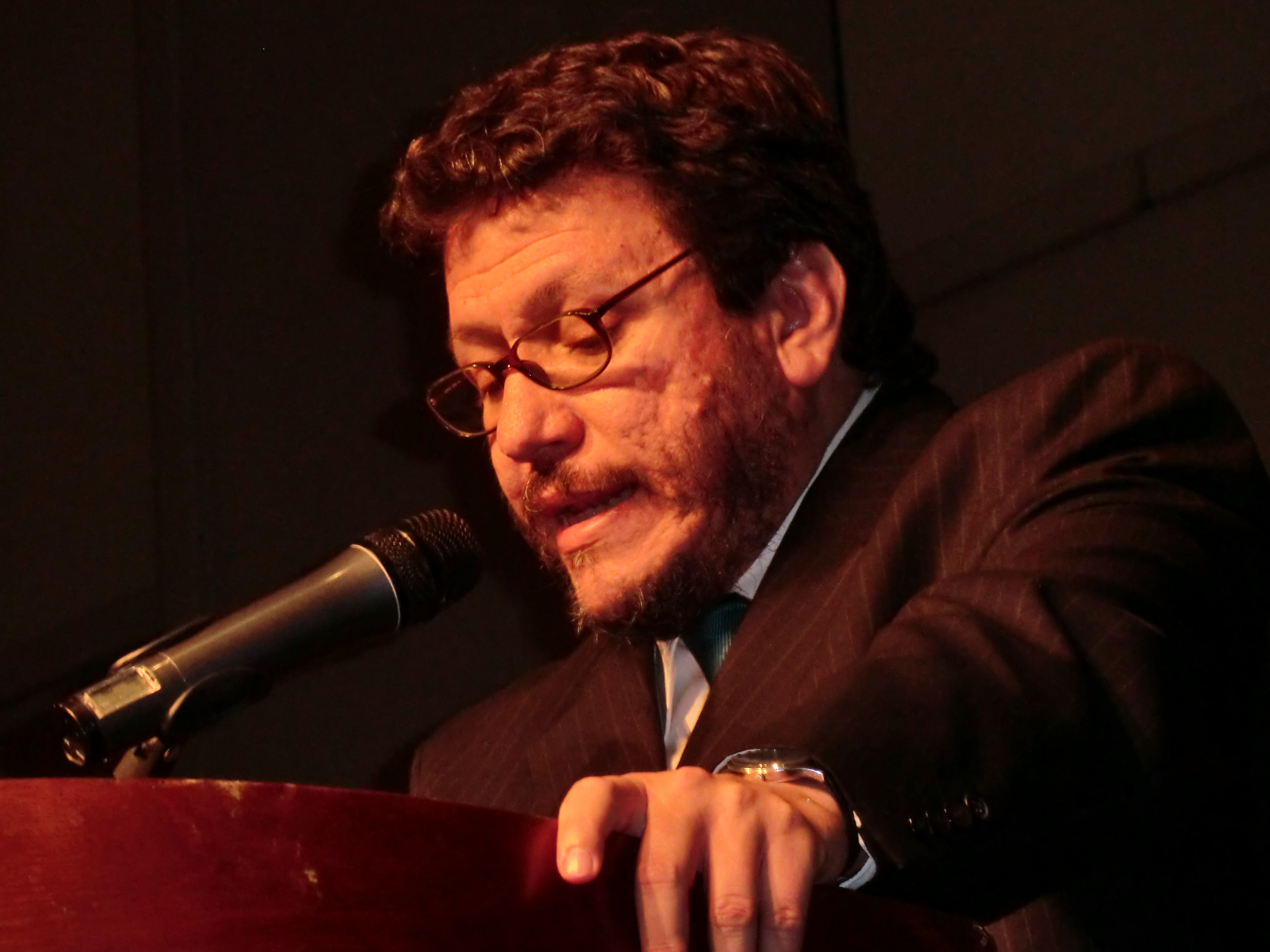
Santiago Gamboa (Caracas, November 2011)

Santiago Gamboa Samper (born 1965) is a Colombian writer.

== Biography ==
Born in Bogotá, he studied literature at the Javerian University of Bogotá. He moved to Spain, where he remained until 1990 and graduated in Hispanic philology at the Complutense University of Madrid. He then moved to Paris, where he studied Cuban literature at the Sorbonne.

He made his debut as a novelist with Páginas de vuelta (1995); later he wrote Perder es cuestión de método (1997), which was translated into Italian, French, Greek, Portuguese, Czech, and German. The novel was adapted into a 2005 film directed by Sergio Cabrera. His novel El síndrome de Ulises (2005) was a finalist for the 2007 Rómulo Gallegos Prize. Later he published Vida feliz de un joven llamado Esteban (2000). He is also the author of the travel book Octubre en Pekín (2001).

In 2009, Gamboa published Necropolis, a novel that won that year's La Otra Orilla Literary Prize. In 2012 the novel was published in English by Europa Editions.

As a journalist, he has been a contributor to the Latin American Service of Radio France International in Paris, a correspondent for El Tiempo and columnist for the magazine Cromos. He lives in Italy.

== Works ==
- 1995 Páginas de vuelta, novel.
- 1997 Perder es cuestión de método, novel.
- 2000 Vida feliz de un joven llamado Esteban, novel.
- 2001 Los impostores, novel.
- 2002 Octubre en Pekín, travel book.
- 2004 El cerco de Bogotá, short stories.
- 2005 El síndrome de Ulises, novel.
- 2008 Hotel Pekin, novel.
- 2009 Necrópolis, novel (translated into English as Necropolis, tr. Howard Curtis, Europa Editions, 2012).
- 2012 Plegarias nocturnas, novel (translated into English as Night Prayers, tr. Howard Curtis, Europa Editions, 2016).
- 2014 Una casa en Bogotá, novel.
- 2016 Volver al oscuro valle, novel (translated into English as Return to the Dark Valley).
- 2022 Colombian Psycho novel
