= Bibi Blocksberg (film) =

2002 film by Hermine Huntgeburth

- Directed by: Hermine Huntgeburth
- Written by: Elfie Donnelly
- Based on: Bibi Blocksberg by Elfie Donnelly
- Starring: Sidonie von Krosigk; Katja Riemann; Ulrich Noethen; Maximilian Befort; Corinna Harfouch
- Release date: 26 September 2002
- Country: Germany

Bibi Blocksberg is a German children's film from 2002 directed by Hermine Huntgeburth. Like Bibi Blocksberg and the Secret of the Blue Owls, it is based on the characters from the children's radio play series Bibi Blocksberg. Elfie Donnelly wrote the script.

== Plot ==
The young witch Bibi Blocksberg is to be awarded the Witch's Ball, usually only received at the age of 15, by the Witch Council because of her special achievements in saving two children from death in flames. Bibi and her mother Barbara are proud, but her father Bernhard Blocksberg is critical of the award because of the attention it brings to the witches in his family, making him unpopular at work.

Nevertheless, the two witches don't let their joy at the award ceremony be spoiled. But the evil witch Rabia is jealous of Bibi's success. In her opinion, a witch who grows up in the purely human, i.e. non-witch society, should not receive the honor of being awarded the witch's ball. She deliberately drops Bibi's ball and has to give her own witch's ball to Bibi instead. However, Rabia's witch ball contains the formula for a stolen magic potion that promises eternal youth, and without the formula Rabia cannot prepare the magic potion.

Rabia then swears revenge on the Blocksberg family and tries to regain the crystal ball by any means she can.

== Reviews ==
"Eventful and turbulent film adaptation of the successful children's book and radio play classic that provides solid entertainment for its target group. Nevertheless, the familiar program is played out with too much routine, and the film, above all, fails to breathe life into the positive characters." – Lexicon of international film

== Special features ==
The film Bibi Blocksberg was the most successful German-language film in 2002.

The sequel Bibi Blocksberg and the Secret of the Blue Owls followed in 2004.

The aerial shots at the beginning and end of the film show the old town of Nördlingen. The exterior shots in the fictional "Neustadt", however, were filmed in Freising.

The video release was certified 11× Platinum for sales of 550,000 units.

The 2nd prize at the Chicago International Children's Film Festival 2003 for Live-Action Feature Film went to Bibi Blocksberg.
