= Chourmo =

Book by Jean-Claude Izzo

- First edition cover
- Author: Jean-Claude Izzo
- Translator: Howard Curtis
- Genre: Mediterranean noir novel
- Publisher: Europa Editions (English translation)
- Publication date: 1996
- Publication place: France
- English publication date: September 30, 2006
- Pages: 256 pp
- ISBN: 978-1-933372-17-4
- OCLC: 70868424
- Preceded by: Total Chaos
- Followed by: Solea

Chourmo is the second book of French author Jean-Claude Izzo's Marseilles Trilogy.
