= Total Chaos (novel) =

1995 novel by Jean-Claude Izzo

- First edition cover
- Author: Jean-Claude Izzo
- Original title: Total Khéops
- Translator: Howard Curtis
- Genre: Mediterranean noir crime novel
- Publisher: Europa Editions (English translation)
- Publication date: 1995
- Publication place: France
- English publication date: November 15, 2005
- Pages: 215 pp
- ISBN: 1-933372-04-4
- OCLC: 86270948
- Followed by: Chourmo

Total Chaos is the first novel of French author Jean-Claude Izzo's Marseilles Trilogy. It is considered a modern classic of the Mediterranean noir style. Its original French title is Total Khéops.

== Synopsis ==
The story takes place in Marseille during summer. "Ugo, Manu and Fabio grew up together on the mean streets of Marseilles, where friendship means everything." Fabio Montale, a suburban-Marseille cop, sees his two closest childhood friends die one-by-one in violent circumstances. One was killed without anyone knowing why, the other was killed immediately after assassinating one of the leaders of the local underworld. Montale tries to understand what happened and gradually discovers a tangle of interests and power struggles within the Marseilles underworld and police.

== Characters ==
Ugo Ugo is the opening character of the novel, and we learn about his involvement in crime when he arrives back in Marseilles to avenge the murder of childhood friend Manu. He stays with Lole, a love interest who Manu was also interested in.

Manu Manu is already deceased at the beginning of the novel, and the story follows Fabio, a policeman as he avenges his two friends. He was involved romantically with Lole.

Fabio Montale Fabio Montale is "the perfect protagonist in this city of melancholy beauty. A disenchanted cop with an inimitable talent for living who turns his back on a police force marred by corruption and racism and, in the name of friendship, takes the fight against the mafia into his own hands"

Lole Lole is the gypsy love interest of the now deceased Manu and Ugo. She is described in the novel as "Her hands deep in the pockets of a straw-coloured bathrobe. The colour made her skin look browner than usual and emphasized the blackness of her hair, which she was wearing short now. Her hips may have grown thicker, he wasn't sure. She'd become a woman, but she hadn't changed. Lole, the gypsy. She'd always been beautiful."
