= Fabio Geda =

Italian novelist (born 1972)

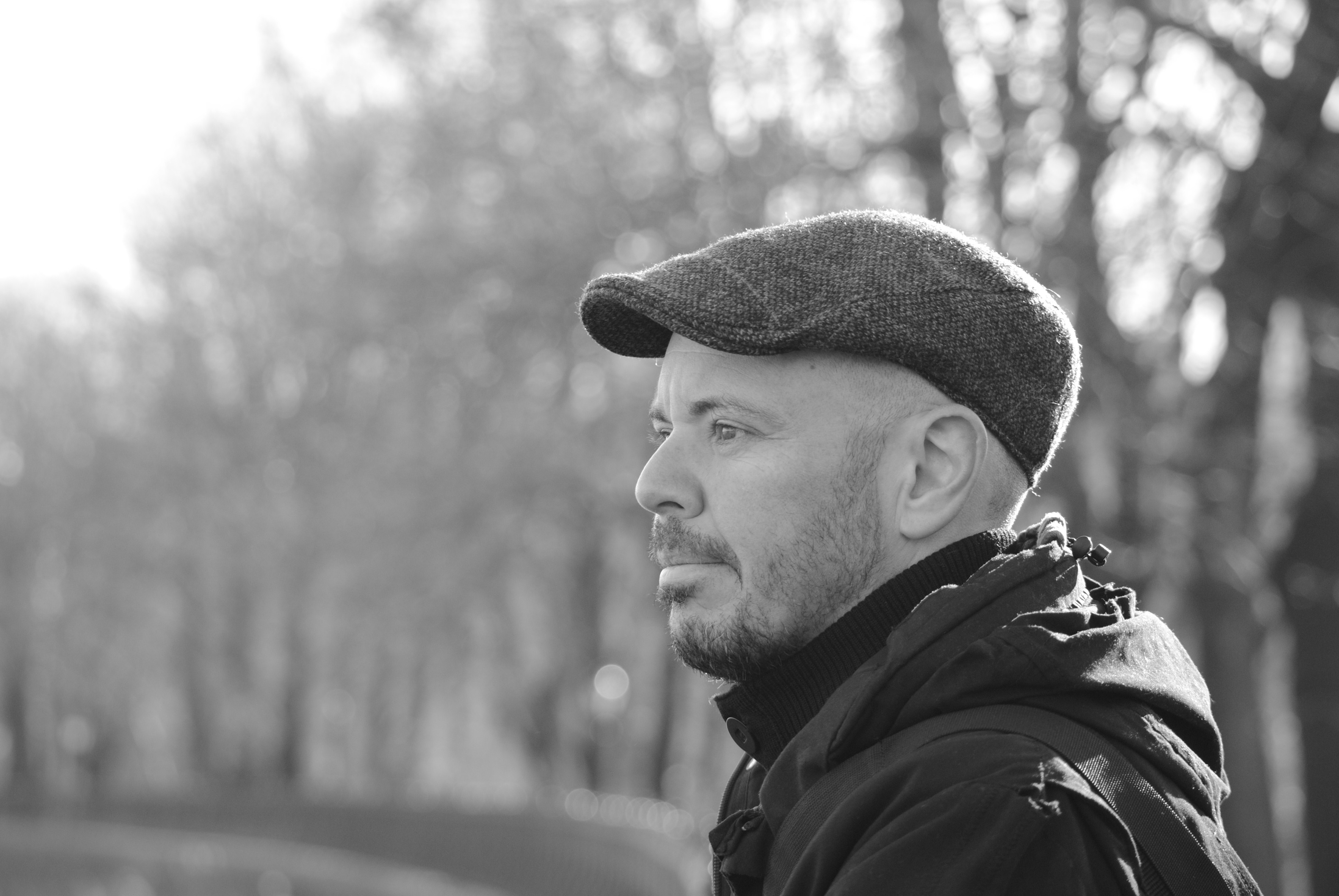
- Fabio Geda, Central Park, New York, 2012
- Born: 1 March 1972 (age 54); Turin, Italy
- Occupation: Writer

Fabio Geda (born 1 March 1972) is an Italian novelist.

Born in Turin, Geda graduated in Communication Sciences with a thesis in marketing. He worked as an educator, first as a voluntary, later into a cooperative. His debut novel Per il resto del viaggio ho sparato agli indiani has been selected for the Strega Prize.

Geda had his breakout in 2010 with the novel In the Sea There Are Crocodiles (Italian: Nel mare ci sono i coccodrilli); based on a true story of Enaiat Akbari, the novel became a bestseller, selling over 400,000 copies in Italy alone and being translated in over 30 languages.
