= Lukas und Sohn =

- Country of origin: Germany

Lukas und Sohn is a German television series.

== See also ==
- List of German television series
