= Uwe Karpa =

German actor (born 1945)

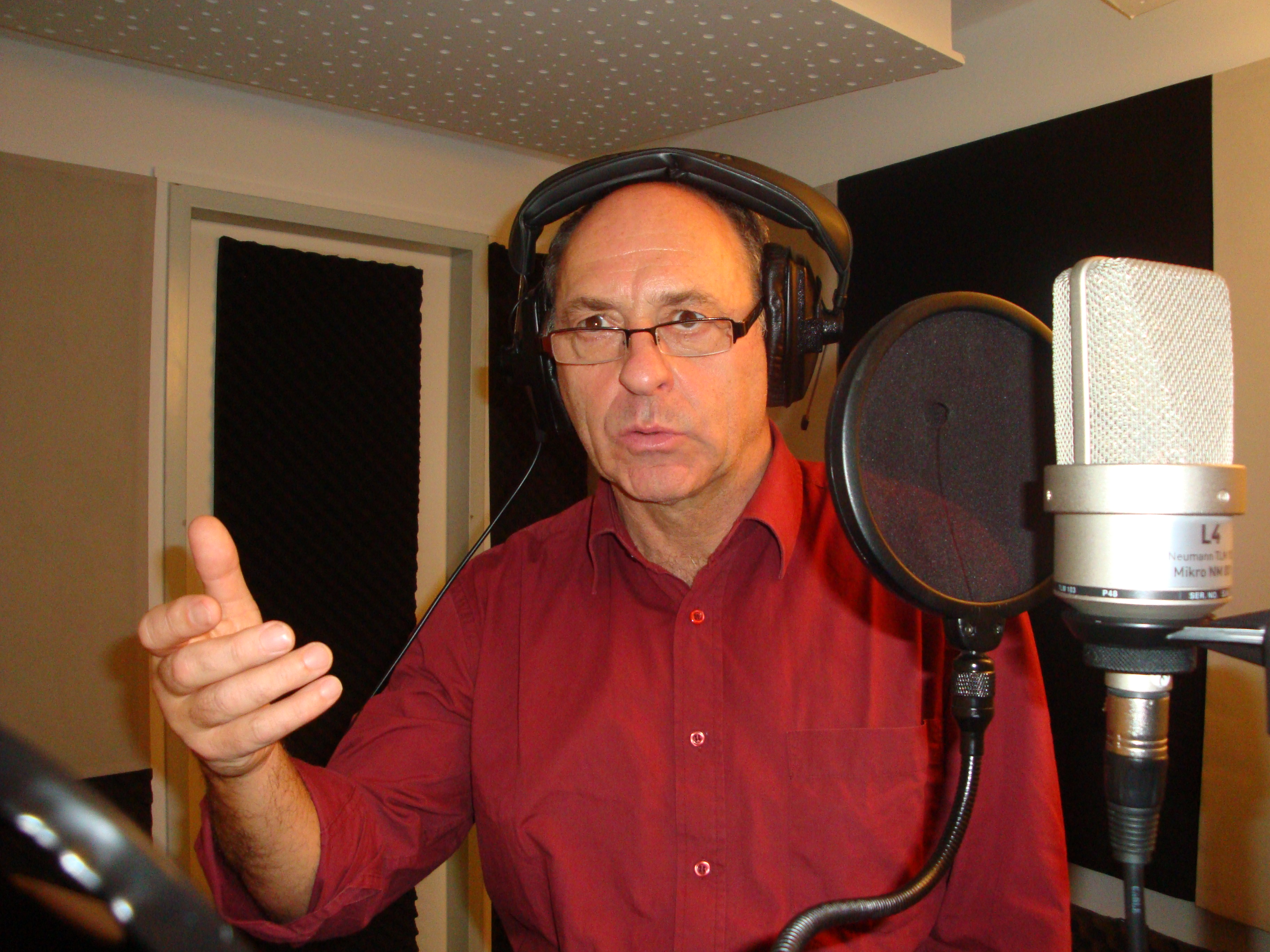
- Karpa in 2009
- Born: 18 September 1945 (age 79); Berlin, Germany
- Occupations: Actor; voice actor
- Years active: 1965–present

Uwe Karpa (born 18 September 1945) is a German actor and voice actor.

== Acting career ==
He has been performing roles in theatre, film, and television since 1965. Karpa received his acting training in Karl-Marx-Stadt. He performed in theatres in, among others, Frankfurt an der Oder, Berlin, Dresden, and Bad Segeberg. On television, he was particularly well known between 1996 and 2005 in the role of staff nurse Brenneke (Oberpfleger Brenneke) in the series Alphateam – Die Lebensretter im OP. He had his cinematic debut in 1965 in Berlin um die Ecke. In 2007 in Der Baader-Meinhof-Komplex, he played the role of the police chief.

== Selected filmography ==
=== Film ===
List of film appearances, with year, title, and role shown
Year	Title	Role	Notes
1965	Denk bloß nicht, ich heule	Bubi	
1988	Bear Ye One Another's Burden	Second comrade	
2007	The Baader Meinhof Complex	Police chief	
2012	Der Gründer	Glenny Rosenberg	

=== Television ===
List of television appearances, with year, title, and role shown
Year	Title	Role	Notes
1971	Rottenknechte	Anton Roth	multi-part television film
1980	Archiv des Todes	Patrolman	multi-part television film
1988–91	Polizeiruf 110	Various roles	4 episodes
1993–95	Wolffs Revier	Schröder	3 episodes
1997–2006	Alphateam – Die Lebensretter im OP	Helmut Brenneke	233 episodes
2019	SOKO Potsdam	Tänzer Erwin	1 episode
