= Kanal Telemedial =

- Country: Austria; Germany

Programming
- Picture format: 144p SDTV

Ownership
- Owner: Kanal Telemedial Privatrundfunk GmbH

History
- Launched: 5 December 2007; 18 years ago
- Former names: Primetime (2006-2007)

Links
- Website: www.telemedial.de

Kanal Telemedial was an Austrian television channel that described itself as the “first spiritual broadcaster in Europe”. Thomas Hornauer was the managing director and sole shareholder.

== History ==
Kanal Telemedial initially went on air on 29 June 2006 under the name Primetime. On 5 December 2007, the station changed its concept and name to Kanal Telemedial. This also marked the start of the Telemediale Zeit, the time that has passed since the station was redesigned and was continuously displayed on several monitors in the background of the studio.

The station's program, which is based in Vienna, started at the end of 2006. However, the majority of the content was produced in the former B.TV studios in Ludwigsburg. Since 8 February 2008, broadcasts have also been made from the former horse stable at the Schwarzenberg Palace in Vienna, which was being converted into a television studio at the time.

The station broadcast a 24-hour service via Astra Digital. On some cable networks and via analog satellite, the channel was broadcast daily from 9 p.m. to 6 a.m. after KiKA shut down for the night. The channel was also broadcast 24 hours a day via a live stream on its official homepage. Repeats were often broadcast. Kanal Telemedial broadcast for the last time on 1 July 2008. The Primetime media service, which is also owned by Thomas Hornauer, then broadcast on the same frequency.

On 5 June 2008, the Austrian communications authority determined that Telemedial's broadcasting license had expired. The channel was unable to demonstrate regular broadcasting operations from Austria and therefore did not operate legally in accordance with the license. Through further research, the authority found that Telemedial currently only consists of volunteers. The staff responsible for broadcasting operations is missing. Hornauer's appeal against the loss of the license was rejected by the Austrian Federal Communications Senate. The Senate thus confirmed the expiry of the approval as determined by the communications authority.

The Primetime media service stopped broadcasting on the evening of 31 July 2008. After a short break, Hornauer returned with “Kanal Telemedial”. Hornauer explained that after discussions with his lawyer, he objected to the revocation of the broadcasting license. However, this was rejected as unfounded on 27 June 2008. Broadcast repeats will only be shown via the live stream on the Kanal Telemedial website. Since 2 June 2009, the Telemedial channel has been running as a live stream again and broadcast live programs at irregular intervals. Otherwise, an emergency program consisting of repeats was received. Broadcasting activities have been stopped since the end of 2017.

== Programming ==
Initially, Kanal Telemedial's line-up, like its predecessor channels, consisted of telephone consultations. Among the advisors who could be reached outside of the program via several Telekontor premium-rate numbers were card readers, “star seers” and also some seers who used methods such as a pendulum prism or roots from which they could get the information the caller wanted read specifications, worked. The audience could be connected to the studio by telephone and the respective advisors now claimed to be able to predict events in their future. In most cases, topics were chosen by the caller, such as health, love or finances. Game elements were sometimes incorporated into the advice programs, such as quick rounds in which the caller was only given advice for a limited number of minutes.

From the end of 2007, the advice programs no longer formed a significant part of the program content. In the evenings, the station showed a different format and increasingly relied on teleshopping elements. The show's presenter staff gathered irregularly in front of the studio backdrop and gave demonstrations. For example, presenters danced a dance around a pyramid, which is one of the central elements of a program, or the presenters joined hands and slowly walked in circles around this pyramid to “gather energy”. The main speaker was usually Hornauer. Another element of the programs was the so-called OrangeTable, where topics such as “energy” and “spirituality” were discussed. At times, callers were put through to the studio, and some viewer emails were processed, and some critical emails were also addressed. The OrangeTable also gave callers to the show the opportunity to speak to the Telemedial team of presenters. Most of the calls were made to Thomas Hornauer, with some viewers reciting poems, talking to him about the “telemedial idea” or complaining about the program that could be seen on this channel. Several amateur bands also played on the broadcasts. Artists were also present in the studio and created pictures live in a broadcast on a specific topic such as faith.

The last broadcast of Kanal Telemedial was broadcast until midnight on 31 July 2008, after 210 days of broadcasting. A short time later, the program was broadcast over the Internet via live stream with repeats and new programs.

== “Free-pay TV channel” business model ==
Since the end of 2007, the station's viewers have been asked to do so-called "energy balancing". The broadcaster, which described itself as a “free pay TV broadcaster” as part of this campaign, asked callers to compensate for the energy gained from watching by displaying telephone numbers that could be called up to a cost of €50. For people who have to get by on very little money, there was the opportunity to support the station at the Telemedial Club for €5 per month. A viewer should pay €15 for one evening's consumption. One offer was the spontaneous sharing of impulses by telephone, which was basically like a donation to the station; the impetus should be the feeling of progress through the station.

== The "Telemedial Idea" ==
Thomas G. Hornauer explained the Telemedial idea as a school of life, which is not only about understanding and learning on the mental level, but also about intuition. The viewer should be the focus here and bring up the topics directly. Hornauer's table OrangeTable was intended to serve as a spiritual level. Hornauer also compares the Telemedial idea to a pregnancy in which the "child" continues to develop through Telemedial.

== Criticism and reception ==
The Frankfurter Allgemeine Zeitung characterized the station as “a single rip-off company disguised with a belief in fate”.

Norbert Schneider, head of the state media authority in North Rhine-Westphalia and chairman of the joint office for programs, advertising and media competence of the state media authorities (GSPWM), said: “Taking money to transmit energies across the screen overshadows everything that has existed before has.”

In April 2008 it became known that Kanal Telemedial had been reprimanded by the Austrian television supervisory authority because the program promoted behavior that was harmful to health. Viewers would trust in healing through telemedia and therefore forego visits to the doctor.

Oliver Kalkofe parodied and criticized Kanal Telemedial several times in his program Kalkofes Mattscheibe. The satirical website Fernsehenkritik.tv also published critical articles on the Telemedial channel. The film The Founder (Der Gründer) is partly based on the work of Thomas G. Hornauer. He initially took legal action against the film, but ultimately decided not to ban the film in order not to increase its popularity.
