= Lluís Quintana-Murci =

Spanish biologist and researcher

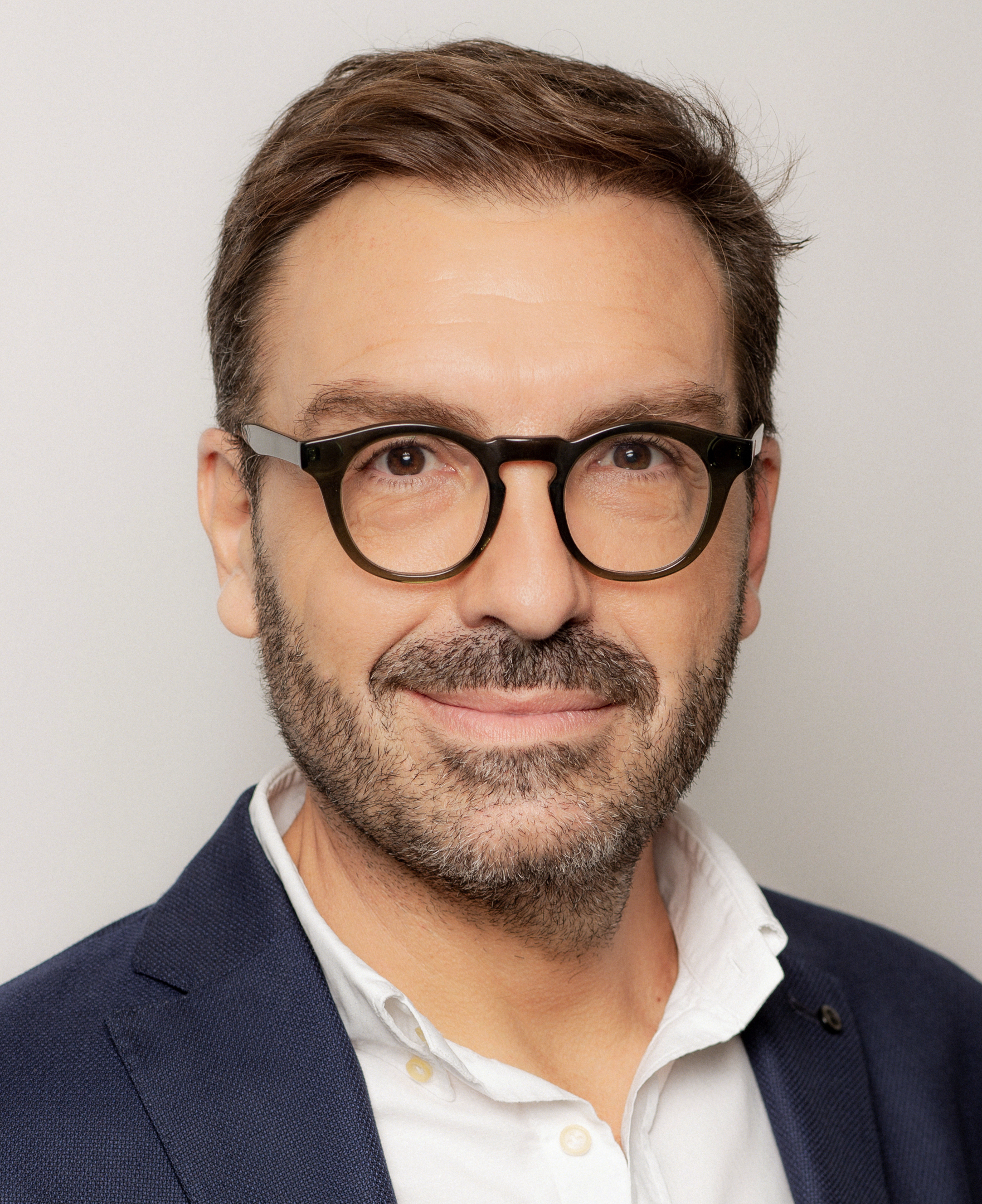
- Born: 26 March 1970 (age 55); Palma de Mallorca, Spain
- Education: University of Barcelona, University of Pavia, Sorbonne University
- Known for: Population genetics
- Scientific career
- Fields: Human genetics Evolutionary Anthropology; Systems immunology
- Institutions: Collège de France; Institut Pasteur; CNRS
- Website: https://research.pasteur.fr/en/team/human-evolutionary-genetics/

Lluís Quintana-Murci (born 1970 in Palma de Mallorca, Spain) is a French-Spanish biologist and population geneticist known for his research on human evolution, population genomic diversity and its relationship with immune diversity and infectious diseases.

== Biography ==
After studying biology at the University of Barcelona, he obtained a PhD in Human Genetics at the University of Pavia in Italy, and his habilitation to direct research at the Sorbonne University in Paris. After postdoctoral training at the Pasteur Institute and several internships at the University of Arizona (Tucson, USA) and University of Oxford (UK), Lluis Quintana-Murci joined the CNRS as a researcher in human population genetics in 2001. He heads the Unit of Human Evolutionary Genetics (CNRS UMR2000) at the Institut Pasteur since 2007, and has been Scientific Director of the Institut during 2016-2017. He is presently Professor at the Collège de France (Chair of Human Genomics and Evolution) and Institut Pasteur.

== Research interests ==
Lluis Quintana-Murci is a population geneticist whose research focuses on the study of the genetic architecture of human populations and the role of genetic diversity in human adaptation. In particular, his laboratory uses genomic data to infer the past demographic history of human populations, with a special focus on Africa and the Pacific, and dissect the different forms in which natural selection can act on the human genome. His team is especially interested in exploring the extent to which pathogens have exerted pressures on human innate immunity genes. Over the last years, his team also correlates genetic and epigenetic variation in populations with different ancestries and lifestyles with molecular phenotypes related to immune responses, to identify mechanisms that have been crucial for our past and present survival against infection. In this context, his research focuses on the study of the genetic, epigenetic and environmental factors driving variation in immune responses, as this helps to lay the foundations of precision medicine related to infectious and immune-related disorders. His laboratory combines molecular and population genetics approaches, with computational modelling and development of new statistical frameworks.

Lluis Quintana-Murci has co-authored over 200 publications on fundamental population genetics as well as evolutionary genetics of infection and published 12 book chapters. He has been a laureate of the European Research Council (ERC), and is a member of EMBO, the Academia Europaea, and the French Academy of Sciences.

== Awards and honours ==
- Bronze Medal of CNRS (2008)
- Georges, Jacques et Elias Canetti Award, Institut Pasteur (2009)
- Silver Medal of CNRS (2013)
- Member of EMBO (2014)
- Member of Academia Europaea (2014)
- Medicine and Biomedical Research Award "Jean Hamburger" of the City of Paris (2014)
- Mergier-Bourdeix Award, French Academy of Sciences (2015)
- Gold Medal of the Balearic Islands (2018)
- René et Andrée Award Duquesne, Institut Pasteur (2019)
- Allianz Fondation Allianz – Institut de France Award (2019)
- Elected member of the French Academy of Sciences (2019)

== Main Publications ==
- Choin J, Mendoza-Revilla J, Arauna LR, Cuadros-Espinoza S, Cassar O, Larena M, Min-Shan Ko A, Harmant C, Laurent R, Verdu P, Laval G, Boland A, Olaso R, Deleuze JF, Valentin F, Ko YC, Jakobsson M, Gessain A, Excoffier L, Stoneking M, Patin E, Quintana-Murci L (2021) Genomic insights into population history and biological adaptation in Oceania. Nature 592(7855):583-589 PMID: 33854233
- Kerner G, Laval G, Patin E, Boisson-Dupuis S, Abel L, Casanova JL, Quintana-Murci L (2021) Human ancient DNA analyses reveal the high burden of tuberculosis in Europeans over the last 2,000 years. American Journal of Human Genetics 108(3):517-524 PMID: 33667394
- Quintana-Murci L (2019) Human Immunology through the Lens of Evolutionary Genetics. Cell 177(1):184-199 PMID: 30901539
- Piasecka B, Duffy D, Urrutia A, Quach H, Patin E, Posseme C, Bergstedt J, Charbit B, Rouilly V, MacPherson C, Hasan M, Albaud B, Gentien D, Fellay J, Albert M, Quintana-Murci L. & the Milieu Intérieur Consortium (2018). Distinctive Roles of Age, Sex and Genetics in Shaping Transcriptional Variation of Human Immune Responses to Microbial Challenges. Proceedings of the National Academy of Sciences USA 115(3):E488-E497 PMID: 29282317
- Lopez M, Kousathanas A, Quach H, Harmant C, Mouguiama P, Hombert JM, Froment A, Perry GH, Barreiro LB, Verdu P, Patin E, Quintana-Murci L (2018). The demographic history and mutational load of African hunter-gatherers and farmers. Nature Ecology and Evolution 2(4):721-730 PMID: 29531345
- Patin E, Lopez M, Grollemund R, Verdu P, Harmant C, Quach H, Laval G, Perry GH, Barreiro LB, Froment A, Heyer E, Massougbodji A, Fortes-Lima C, Migot-Nabias F, Bellis G, Dugoujon JM, Pereira JB, Fernandes V, Pereira L, Van der Veen L, Mouguiama-Daouda P, Bustamante CD, Hombert JM, Quintana-Murci L (2017) Dispersals and genetic adaptation of Bantu-speaking populations in Africa and North America. Science 356: 543–546 PMID: 28473590
- Quach H, Rotival M, Pothlichet J, Loh YE, Dannemann M, Zidane N, Laval G, Patin E, Harmant C, Lopez M, Deschamps M, Naffakh N, Duffy D, Coen A, Leroux-Roels G, Clément F, Boland A, Deleuze JF, Kelso J, Albert ML, Quintana-Murci L (2016) Genetic Adaptation and Neandertal Admixture Shaped the Immune System of Human Populations. Cell 167(3):643-656 PMID: 27768888
- Fagny M, Patin E, MacIsaac JL, Rotival M, Flutre T, Jones MJ, Siddle KJ, Quach H, Harmant C, McEwen LM, Froment A, Heyer E, Gessain A, Betsem E, Mouguiama-Daouda P, Hombert JM, Perry GH, Barreiro LB, Kobor MS, Quintana-Murci L (2015) The epigenomic landscape of African rainforest hunter-gatherers and farmers. Nature Communications 6:10047 PMID: 26616214
- Manry J, Laval G, Patin E, Fornarino S, Itan Y, Fumagalli M, Sironi M, Tichit M, Bouchier C, Casanova JL, Barreiro LB & Quintana-Murci L (2011) Evolutionary genetic dissection of human interferons. Journal of Experimental Medicine 208, 2747-2759 PMID: 22162829
- Barreiro LB, Quintana-Murci L (2010) From evolutionary genetics to human immunology: how selection shapes host defence genes. Nature Reviews Genetics 11(1):17-30 PMID: 19953080
- Barreiro, L.B., Laval, G., Quach, H., Patin, E. & Quintana-Murci, L. (2008) Natural selection has driven population differentiation in modern humans. Nature Genetics 40, 340-345 PMID: 18246066
- Quintana-Murci, L., Semino, O., Bandelt, H.J., Passarino, G., McElreavey, K. & Santachiara- Benerecetti, A.S. (1999) Genetic evidence of an early exit of Homo sapiens sapiens from Africa through eastern Africa. Nature Genetics 23, 437-441 PMID: 10581031
