= Elfie Donnelly =

British-Austrian author (born 1950)

- Elfie Donnelly, Frankfurt Book Fair 2026
- Born: 14 January 1950 (age 76); London, England
- Occupation: Author
- Spouses: Peter Lustig (m. 1973, divorced); Paul Arató
- Children: 2

Elfie Donnelly (born 14 January 1950) is a British-Austrian author, who has written numerous books and radio dramas for children. Her major works are Bibi Blocksberg and Benjamin Blümchen.

== Biography ==
Donnelly spent her early childhood in Rugby in the English Midlands, and moved to Vienna in her later childhood. The daughter of an Irish father and an Austrian mother, she started a career in journalism already in her youth. In Vienna, she worked as a texter in the news agency APA, where her mother had also worked. In 1973, she moved to West Berlin, married Peter Lustig and started writing Hörspiele (audio dramas) for children. She won the German prize for youth literature with her first book. In the 1980s, she became a disciple of Indian mystic Osho. At present she lives with her current husband, author Paul Arató, in Ibiza. Donnelly's two grown-up sons live in Austria and America.

== Works ==
At age 26, Donnelly published her first book: Servus Opa, sagte ich leise, a story of a small boy telling about the death of his grandfather. The book won the German youth literature prize and the Hans-im-Glück prize in 1978. The book about the accompanying TV series won the Adolf Grimme prize in 1979.

Two of her most famous series are Benjamin Blümchen (literally “Benjamin Small Flower”, later localised into English as “Benjamin the Elephant”), which deal with the adventures of the talking elephant Benjamin and his little friend, the boy Otto, and Bibi Blocksberg, a series about the adventures of a young cheeky witch. Since 1977, Donnelly has written 65 episodes of Benjamin Blümchen and 40 episodes of Bibi Blocksberg. After seven years, she sold the rights to the works and moved to Mallorca. The Benjamin Blümchen audio cassettes have sold over 54 million copies. Summer 2007 marked the 30th anniversary of the series.

Donnelly has also written the new Hörspiel and book series Elea Eluanda, a story about a disabled girl, who hasn't let her fate put her down, and is accompanied by her Indian friend Ravi and her "consoling owl" Ezechiel. Keeping in with Donnelly's style, all episodes of the series have easily recognisable signature sounds or phrases: Ezechiel's Aramba cholé is as ubiquitous in the respective series as Bibi Blocksberg's Hex-hex or Benjamin Blümchen's Töröö.

Donnelly also writes poetry.

=== Works for adults ===
In adult literature, Donnelly has written two detective books for Piper Verlag: Kein einziges Wort and Wen der Tod entlässt. Both books star a German-Austrian female funeral parlor owner with a fondness for tango. For unknown reasons, critics have mainly ignored these books. ORF is planning a TV series based on the books. Für Paare verboten, published by Hoffmann und Campe, is a caricature of the tantra therapy scene. Donnelly has also written an amusing travel guide Gebrauchsanweisung für Mallorca (2002). Das Glasauge (Donnelly's autobiography), Wendelburgs Komplott and Die Hühnerleiter ins Nirvana are books-on-demand also available as e-book.

== Films ==
In 2001, Donnelly wrote the script for the German 2002 film Bibi Blocksberg.

In 2003, this was followed by Bibi Blocksberg and the Secret of the Blue Owls with Marie Luise Stahl as Elea as the second major character. In both films, Sidonie von Krosigk played Bibi and Katja Riemann, Ulrich Noethen, Corinna Harfouch had other major roles.

In 2005 and 2006, Donnelly wrote the script to a third Bibi Blocksberg film, and together with her husband Paul Arató, she wrote the film scripts Emma Panther and Der kleine Medicus - both family entertainment films. Also in 2006, Donnelly wrote the script to the romantic dramedy film Töne aller Arten based on the book by Peter Trabert.

Currently the author couple Donnelly-Arató are working on a new multimedia character for children.

Donnelly has also written the script for the film Apuena.
