= Peter Lustig =

German television presenter

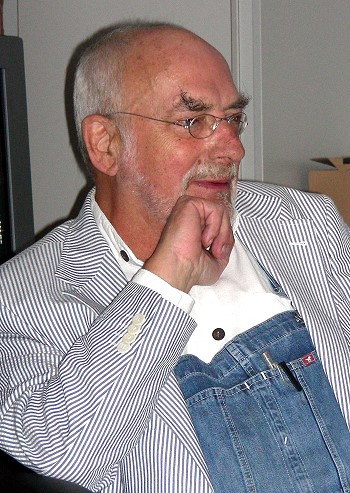
- Lustig in October 2009
- Born: Peter Fritz Willi Lustig; 27 October 1937; Breslau, Germany
- Died: 23 February 2016 (aged 78); Bohmstedt, Schleswig-Holstein, Germany
- Occupations: Television presenter, voice actor, narrator, author
- Years active: 1970–2016
- Spouses: Elfie Donnelly (m. 1973, divorced); Astrid Berge (m. 2000)

Peter Fritz Willi Lustig (German: [ˈpeːtɐ ˈlʊstɪç]; 27 October 1937 – 23 February 2016) was a German television presenter, voice actor and author of children's books who has become especially well known as leading actor in the weekly children's television show Löwenzahn, which he hosted from 1979 up until 2006. During its first year the show was called Pusteblume. He also hosted the show Mittendrin (1987–95), narrated the film Gordos Reise ans Ende der Welt (2007) and provided the German voice for the computer game character Gary Gadget.

== Biography ==
Lustig was not a trained actor or host. He originally qualified as a broadcast engineer and an electronics engineer. Working for American Forces Network as a radio engineer in 1963, he was responsible for the recording of US President John F. Kennedy's speech Ich bin ein Berliner held in Berlin.

Starting in 1970, he began appearing in front of the camera. His first appearance was a short sketch in the popular German children's show Die Sendung mit der Maus, where a raw egg was dropped onto his bald head, with him making a funny commentary about it. He went on to have small roles in Die Sendung mit der Maus and the German segments of Sesame Street. His popularity increased, which led to him starring in his own show Löwenzahn from 1979 onwards, where he explained various phenomena of science and nature to children.

He often ended an episode with a proposal to turn off the TV now with his famous hand turning gesture, as if he was turning off an old TV. His show persona always wore characteristic blue dungarees and lived in a wooden building site cabin in fictitious Bärstadt ("Beartown").

In 2006 he retired from his role as the host of the show mainly due to health issues - he had been diagnosed with lung cancer in 1984. He had managed to overcome the disease after ten years, but had one of his lungs removed in the process, which made it difficult for him to breathe and forced him to use a walking stick.

Since the 1980s Lustig was a follower of Osho.

Lustig's books include the science comic Wie funktioniert ein Auto? ("How does a car work?") (1983) on the working principles of automobiles, the two-volume handicraft book Peter Lustigs Bastelbuch ("Peter Lustig's Book of Handicraft") (1985 and 1987), and the children's cookbook Kochbuch für kleine Feinschmecker ("Cookbook for little gourmets") (1992). He also authored Vertonen: Der Ton zu den Bildern ("Set to music: The Soundtrack to the Images") (1987), a book on post-recording of soundtracks for films and slideshows, and Lieber Momme: Wunderliche Briefe ("Beloved Momme: Strange Letters") (1989), a book made up of letters he wrote to his young son from hospital, where Peter Lustig stayed many times throughout the 1980s due to lung cancer surgery.

Lustig's second wife, British-Austrian children's author and fellow follower of Osho Elfie Donnelly, published the book Peters Flucht ("Peter's escape") (1986) about the 8-year-old Lustig's escape with his family from the city of Breslau (modern-day Wrocław) in 1945.

He died on 23 February 2016 at the age of 78 at his home in Bohmstedt near Husum surrounded by his family. He is survived by his four children and nine grandchildren.

In May 2016, he was buried at sea, which was his last wish due to his love for nature and the sea.

== Filmography ==
- 1972 – 1973: Die Sendung mit der Maus
- 1979 – 1981: Pusteblume
- 1981 – 2005: Löwenzahn (Children's TV show)
- 1987 – 1995: Mittendrin
- 2005: Löwenzahn – Die Reise ins Abenteuer (TV film based on the show)
- 2007: Gordos Reise ans Ende der Welt (narrator)

== Accolades ==
In addition to winning numerous prizes, including two of the renowned Adolf-Grimme-Preis for Löwenzahn, in 2007 Lustig was granted the Order of Merit of the Federal Republic of Germany for his effort for education. It was handed to him by then-German head of state Horst Köhler.
