= Der Hausgeist =

- Starring: Susanne Uhlen
- Country of origin: Germany
- No. of seasons: two
- No. of episodes: 21

Original release
- Release: September 13, 1991 – February 3, 1993

Der Hausgeist ("The House Spirit") is a German comedy television series that aired on the ZDF network from September 13, 1991, to February 3, 1993. It starred Susanne Uhlen, Stefan Behrens, Volker Lechtenbrink, Ursela Monn, Gabi Heinecke and Hans-Werner Bussinger.

== See also ==
- List of German television series
