= Jean-Claude Izzo =

French poet, playwright, screenwriter, and novelist(1945–2000)

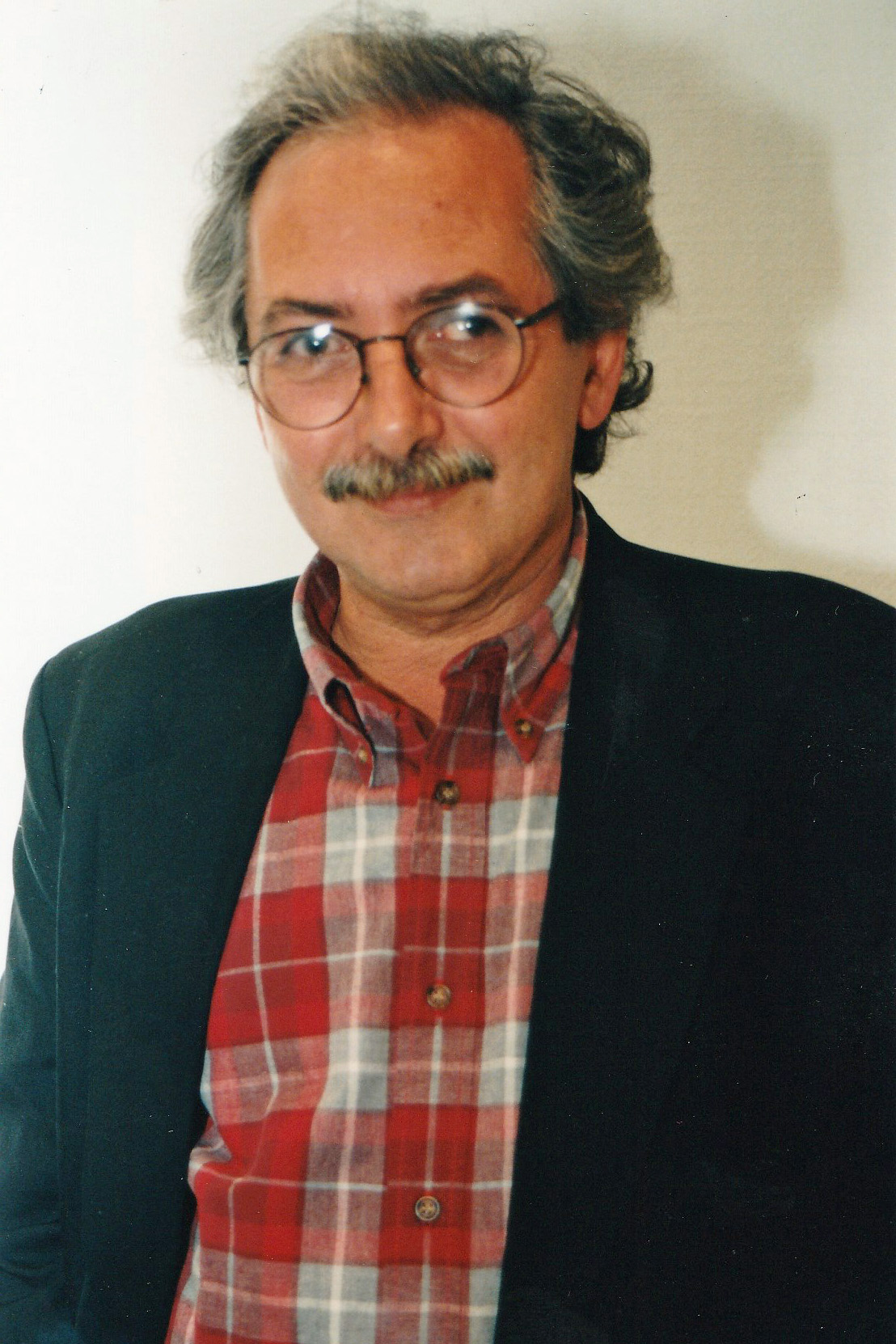
- Jean-Claude Izzo at the 1997 International Geography Festival
- Born: 20 June 1945; Marseille, France
- Died: 26 January 2000 (aged 54); Marseille, France
- Occupation: Novelist
- Writing career
- Language: French
- Genres: Mediterranean noir, crime novel
- Notable work: The Marseille Trilogy
- Notable awards: Trophées 813, Prix Sang d'Encre
- Website: www.jeanclaude-izzo.com

Jean-Claude Izzo (20 June 1945 – 26 January 2000) was a French poet, playwright, screenwriter, and novelist who achieved sudden fame in the mid-1990s with the publication of his three neo-noir crime novels Total Chaos, Chourmo, and Solea (widely known as the Marseilles Trilogy), featuring as protagonist ex-cop Fabio Montale, and set in the author's native city of Marseille. All have been translated into English by Howard Curtis.

Jean-Claude Izzo was born on 20 June 1945 in Marseille, France. His father was an Italian immigrant from Castel San Giorgio (Province of Salerno), and his maternal grandfather was a Spanish immigrant. He excelled in school and spent much of his time at his desk writing stories and poems. But because of his "immigrant" status, he was forced into a technical school where he was taught how to operate a lathe.

In 1963, he began work in a bookstore. He also actively campaigned on behalf of Pax Christi, a Catholic peace movement. In 1964, he was called up for military duty in Toulon and Djibouti. He worked for the military newspaper as a photographer and journalist.

== Bibliography ==
- Poèmes à haute voix (P.J. Oswald, 1970)
- Terres de feu (P.J. Oswald, 1972)
- État de veille (P.J. Oswald, 1974)
- Braises, brasiers, brûlures (poesie illustrate da E. Damofli, 1975)
- Paysage de femme (Guy Chambelland, 1975)
- Le réel au plus vif (Guy Chambelland, 1976)
- Clovis Hughes, un rouge du Midi (J. Laffitte, 1978)
- Total Kheops (Gallimard, Série Noire, 1995). English translation Total Chaos by Howard Curtis (New York: Europa Editions, 2005). Italian translation Casino totale (Editions and/or, 1998). German translation Total Cheops (Unionsverlag, 2000). Polish translation Total khéops (Warszawa: W.A.B., 2005). Irish Translation Kíor Tuathail (Indreabhán: Leabhair Breac, 2017).
- Chourmo (Gallimard, Série Noire, 1996). English translation Chourmo by Howard Curtis, (New York: Europa Editions, 2006). Italian translation Chourmo. Il cuore di Marsiglia (Editions and/or, 1999). German translation Chourmo (Unionsverlag, 2000). Polish translation Szurmo (Warszawa: W.A.B., 2006). Irish Translation Siúrmó (Indreabhán: Leabhair Breac, 2023).
- Loin de tous rivages (Ed. du Ricochet, 1997)
- Les marins perdus (Flammarion, 1997). English translation The Lost Sailors by Howard Curtis (New York: Europa Editions, 2007).Italian translation Marinai perduti (Editions and/or, 2001). German translation Aldebaran (Unionsverlag, 2002). Dutch translation Eindpunt Marseille (Breda: De Geus, 2007). Spanish translation Los marineros perdidos (Editorial Montesinos, 2010)
- Vivre fatigue (Librio, 1998). Italian translation Vivere stanca (Editions and/or, 2001). German edition Leben macht müde (Unionsverlag, 2005)
- Soléa (Gallimard, Série Noire, 1998). English translation Solea by Howard Curtis, (New York: Europa Editions, 2007). Italian translation Solea (Editions and/or, 2000). German translation Solea (Unionsverlag, 2001). . Polish translation Solea (Warszawa: W.A.B., 2007)
- L'Aride des jours (Ed. du Ricochet, 1999)
- Le soleil des mourants (Flammarion, 1999). English translation A Sun for the Dying (New York: Europa Editions, 2008). Italian translation Il sole dei morenti (Editions and/or, 2000). German edition Die Sonne der Sterbenden (Unionsverlag, 2003).
- Un temps immobile (Filigrane Editions, 1999)
- La Méditerranée en fragments (Maison méditerranéenne des sciences de l'homme, 2000). Italian translation Frammenti di Mediterraneo story in Rappresentare il Mediterraneo. Lo sguardo francese (Mesogea, 2000)
- Marseille (Hoëbeke, 2000). English edition Garlic, Mint and Sweet Basil: Essays on Marseilles, Mediterranean Cuisine, and Noir Fiction by Howard Curtis (Europa Editions, 2013). German editions Izzo's Marseille (Unionsverlag, 2003) and Mein Marseille (Unionsverlag, 2010). Italian translation Aglio, menta e basilico (Editions and/or, 2006).

== Awards ==
- 1996 : Prix Sang d'encre for Chourmo.
- 2001: Deutscher Krimi Preis in the category of International (1. Platz) for Chourmo.

== Filmography as an author or screenwriter ==
- Les matins chagrins, directed by Jean-Pierre Gallepe (1990)
- Fabio Montale, series of three TV movies, directed by José Pinheiro (2001). The adaptation was controversial for Alain Delon in the lead since his politics and personality are the opposite of Izzo's.
- Roger et Fred, TV movie (2001).
- Total Kheops, directed by Alain Bévérini (2002)
- Les marins perdus, directed by Claire Devers (2003)

== See also ==
- Mediterranean noir
