= Solea (novel) =

- First edition cover
- Author: Jean-Claude Izzo
- Translator: Howard Curtis
- Genre: Mediterranean noir crime novel
- Publisher: Europa Editions (English translation)
- Publication date: 1998
- Publication place: France
- English publication date: July 15, 2007
- Pages: 205 pp
- ISBN: 978-1-933372-30-3
- OCLC: 131393523
- Preceded by: Chourmo

Solea is the third (and final) novel of French author Jean-Claude Izzo's Marseilles Trilogy.
