= List of translators of children's books =

There is a growing interest in international children's literature, including books in translation. This is recognised in several prizes, including the Marsh Award for Children’s Literature in Translation and the ALSC Mildred L. Batchelder Award for Children's Books Translated into English.

- Ruth Ahmedzai Kemp - Russian, German, Arabic to English
- Sarah Ardizzone – French to English
- Anthea Bell – German to English
- Simon Breden – Spanish to English
- John Brownjohn – German to English
- Karin Chubb – German to English
- Martin Cleaverr – Dutch to English
- Patricia Crampton - German to English
- Howard Curtis – Italian to English
- Lucia Graves – Spanish to English
- Daniel Hahn – Spanish, Portuguese, French to English
- Adriana Hunter – French to English
- Margaret Jull Costa – Basque, Portuguese to English
- Lene Kaaberbol – Danish to English
- Oliver Latsch – German to English
- Sheila LaFarge - Danish, Norwegian, Swedish to English
- Sophie Lewis – French to English
- Julia Marshall – Swedish to English
- Nanette McGuinness - Italian, French to English
- George Miller – French to English
- Denise Muir - Italian to English
- John Nieuwenhuizen – Dutch to English
- Frances Østerfelt – Danish to English
- Anna Paterson – Swedish to English
- Guy Puzey - Norwegian to English
- Azita Rassi – Persian to English
- Betsy Rosenberg - Hebrew to English
- Cheryl Robson – Danish to English
- Lance Salway – Dutch to English
- Lawrence Schimel - Spanish to English
- Ros Schwartz – French to English
- Fatima Sharafeddini – Arabic to English
- Claire Storey - Spanish, Catalan, and German to English
- Ginny Tapley Takemori - Japanese to English
- Laurie Thompson – Swedish to English
- John Thornley – Greek to English
- Avery Fischer Udagawa – Japanese to English
- Helen Wang – Chinese to English
- Rachel Ward - German to English
- Laura Watkinson – Dutch to English
- Siân Williams (translator) Italian to English
- Chantal Wright – German to English

== See also ==
- Freeman Awards
- International Board on Books for Young People (IBBY)
- Society of Children's Book Writers and Illustrators (SCBWI)
