= Mildred L. Batchelder Award =

Annual literary award for children's books

- Awarded for: "the most outstanding of those books originally published in a foreign language in a foreign country, and subsequently translated into English and published in the United States"
- Country: United States
- Presented by: Association for Library Service to Children, a division of the American Library Association
- First award: 1968
- Website: ala.org/alsc/awardsgrants/bookmedia/batchelderaward

The Mildred L. Batchelder Award, or Batchelder Award, is an American Library Association literary award that annually recognizes the publisher of the year's "most outstanding" children's book translated into English and published in the U.S.

The Mildred L. Batchelder Award is unusual in that it is given to a publisher yet it explicitly references a given work, its translator and author. It seeks to recognize translations of children's books into the English language, with the intention of encouraging American publishers to translate high quality foreign language children's books and "promote communication between the people of the world".

It is administered by the Association for Library Service to Children (ALSC), the children's division of ALA, and conferred upon the U.S. publisher.

The award is named in honor of Mildred L. Batchelder, former director of the ALSC. One of her stated goals was "to eliminate barriers to understanding between people of different cultures, races, nations, and languages."

The Batchelder Award was inaugurated in 1968 and there have been 47 winners in 48 years through 2015.

From 1994 there have been 38 worthy runners-up called Honor Books, one to three each year.

The 2015 winner is Eerdmans Books for Young Readers, an imprint of William B. Eerdmans Publishing Co., for Mikis and the Donkey, translated by Laura Watkinson. The Dutch original Mikis, de Ezeljongen (2011) was written by Bibi Dumon Tak, illustrated by Philip Hopman.

== Mildred L. Batchelder ==
Batchelder began her career working in an Omaha, Nebraska Public Library, then as a children's librarian at St. Cloud State Teachers College, and subsequently as librarian of Haven Elementary School in Evanston, Illinois. She eventually joined the ranks of the American Library Association in 1936 spending the next 30 years at the ALA promoting the translation of children's literature.

== Criteria ==
Source: "Batchelder Award terms and criteria"

- The award shall be made to an American publisher for a children's book considered to be the most outstanding of those books originally published in a foreign language in a foreign country and subsequently published in English in the United States during the preceding year.
- The Award, in the form of a citation, shall be made annually, unless no book of that particular year is deemed worthy of the honor. The translation should be true to original work and retain the viewpoint of the author.
- The translation should reflect the style of the author and of the original language.
- The book should not be unduly "Americanized." The book's reader should be able to sense that the book came from another country.
- Folk literature is not eligible.
- Picture books are not eligible unless the text is substantial and at least as important as the pictures.
- The book must have the potential to appeal to a child audience (age 0-14).
- The overall design of the book should enhance and not detract from the text, thus making the book more or less effective as a children's book. Such aspects might include: illustration, type face, layout, book jacket, etc.
- Consideration should be given to the retention of the original illustrator's work in the U.S. edition.

== Recipients ==
Winners are distinguished from Honor Books by yellow background and by 'W' in the far right column.

Batchelder Award winners and runners-up
| Year. | Awarded Publisher | Title | Author | Translator | Language | Result |
|---|---|---|---|---|---|---|
| 1968 | Alfred A. Knopf | The Little Man | Erich Kästner | James Kirkup | German | W |
| 1969 | Charles Scribner's Sons | Don't Take Teddy | Babbis Friis-Baastad | Lise Sømme McKinnon | Norwegian | W |
| 1970 | Holt, Rinehart & Winston | Wildcat Under Glass | Alki Zei | Edward Fenton | Greek | W |
| 1971 | Pantheon Books | In the Land of Ur, the Discovery of Ancient Mesopotamia | Hans Baumann | Stella Humphries | German | W |
| 1972 | Holt, Rinehart & Winston | Friedrich | Hans Peter Richter | Edite Kroll | German | W |
| 1973 | William Morrow | Pulga | S. R. Van Iterson | Alexander and Alison Gode | Dutch | W |
| 1974 | E. P. Dutton | Petros' War | Alki Zei | Edward Fenton | Greek | W |
| 1975 | Crown Publishing Group | An Old Tale Carved Out of Stone | A. Linevskii | Maria Polushkin | Russian | W |
| 1976 | Henry Z. Walck | The Cat and Mouse Who Shared a House | Ruth Hürlimann | Anthea Bell | German | W |
| 1977 | Atheneum Press | The Leopard | Cecil Bødker | Gunnar Poulsen | Danish | W |
| 1978 | (no award) | | | | | |
| 1979 | Harcourt Brace Jovanovich | Rabbit Island | Jörg Steiner | Ann Conrad Lammers | German | W |
| 1979 | Franklin Watts / Scholastic | Konrad | Christine Nöstlinger | Anthea Bell | German | W |
| 1980 | E. P. Dutton | The Sound of the Dragon's Feet | Alki Zei | Edward Fenton | Greek | W |
| 1981 | William Morrow | The Winter When Time Was Frozen | Els Pelgrom | Maryka and Raphael Rudnik | Dutch | W |
| 1982 | Bradbury Press | The Battle Horse | Harry Kullman | George Blecher and Lone Thygesen Blecher | Swedish | W |
| 1983 | Lothrop, Lee & Shepard | Hiroshima No Pika | Toshi Maruki | Kurita-Bando Literary Agency | Japanese | W |
| 1984 | Viking Press | Ronia the Robber's Daughter | Astrid Lindgren | Patricia Crampton | Swedish | W |
| 1985 | Houghton Mifflin | The Island on Bird Street | Uri Orlev | Hillel Halkin | Hebrew | W |
| 1986 | Creative Education | Rose Blanche | Christophe Gallaz and Roberto Innocenti | Martha Coventry and Richard Craglia | Italian | W |
| 1987 | Lothrop, Lee & Shepard | No Hero for the Kaiser | Rudolph Frank | Patricia Crampton | German | W |
| 1988 | McElderry Books | If You Didn't Have Me | Ulf Nilsson | George Blecher and Lone Thygesen Blecher | Swedish | W |
| 1989 | Lothrop, Lee & Shepard | Crutches | Peter Härtling | Elizabeth D. Crawford | German | W |
| 1990 | E. P. Dutton | Buster's World | Bjarne Reuter | Anthea Bell | Danish | W |
| 1991 | E. P. Dutton | A Hand Full of Stars | Rafik Schami | Rika Lesser | German | W |
| 1991 | Houghton Mifflin Company | Two Short and One Long | Nina Ring Aamundsen | | Norwegian | hon |
| 1992 | Houghton Mifflin | The Man from the Other Side | Uri Orlev | Hillel Halkin | Hebrew | W |
| 1993 | (no award) | | | | | |
| 1994 | Farrar, Straus and Giroux | The Apprentice | Pilar Molina Llorente | Robin Longshaw | Spanish | W |
| 1994 | Farrar, Straus and Giroux | The Princess in the Kitchen Garden | Annemie Heymans and Margriet Heymans | Johanna H. Prins and Johanna W. Prins | Dutch | hon |
| 1994 | Viking Press | Anne Frank Beyond the Diary: A Photographic Remembrance | Ruud van der Rol and Rian Verhoeven | Tony Langham and Plym Peters | Dutch | hon |
| 1995 | E.P. Dutton | The Boys from St. Petri | Bjarne Reuter | Anthea Bell | Danish | W |
| 1995 | Lothrop, Lee & Shepard | Sister Shako and Kolo the Goat: Memories of My Childhood in Turkey | Vedat Dalokay | Güner Ener | Turkish | hon |
| 1996 | Houghton Mifflin | The Lady with the Hat | Uri Orlev | Hillel Halkin | Hebrew | W |
| 1996 | Henry Holt & Co | Damned Strong Love: The True Story of Willi G. And Stephan K. | Lutz van Dijk | Elizabeth D. Crawford | German | hon |
| 1996 | Walker and Company | Star of Fear, Star of Hope | Jo Hoestlandt | Mark Polizzotti | French | hon |
| 1997 | Farrar, Straus and Giroux | The Friends | Kazumi Yumoto | Cathy Hirano | Japanese | W |
| 1998 | Henry Holt & Co | The Robber and Me | Josef Holub | Elizabeth D. Crawford | German | W |
| 1998 | Scholastic Press | Hostage to War: a True Story | Tatjana Wassiljewa | Anna Trenter | German | hon |
| 1998 | Viking Press | Nero Corleone: a Cat's Story | Elke Heidenreich | Doris Orgel | German | hon |
| 1999 | Dial Press | Thanks to My Mother | Schoschana Rabinovici | James Skofield | German | W |
| 1999 | Viking Press | Secret Letters from 0 to 10 | Susie Morgenstern | Gill Rosner | French | hon |
| 2000 | Walker and Company | The Baboon King | Anton Quintana | John Nieuwenhuizen | Dutch | W |
| 2000 | Farrar, Straus and Giroux | Collector of Moments | Quint Buchholz | Peter F. Neumeyer | German | hon |
| 2000 | Rabén & Sjögren | Vendela in Venice | Christina Björk | Patricia Crampton | Swedish | hon |
| 2000 | Front Street | Asphalt Angels | Ineke Holtwijk | Wanda Boeke | Dutch | hon |
| 2001 | Arthur A. Levine Books / Scholastic | Samir and Yonatan | Daniella Carmi | Yael Lotan | Hebrew | W |
| 2001 | David R. Godine | Ultimate Game | Christian Lehmann | William Rodarmor | French | hon |
| 2002 | Cricket Books / Carus Publishing | How I Became an American | Karin Gündisch | James Skofield | German | W |
| 2002 | Viking Press | A Book of Coupons | Susie Morgenstern | Gill Rosner | French | hon |
| 2003 | The Chicken House / Scholastic | The Thief Lord | Cornelia Funke | Oliver Latsch | German | W |
| 2003 | David R. Godine | Henrietta and the Golden Eggs | Hanna Johansen | John Barrett | German | hon |
| 2004 | Walter Lorraine Books (Houghton Mifflin) | Run, Boy, Run | Uri Orlev | Hillel Halkin | Hebrew | W |
| 2004 | Chronicle Books | The Man Who Went to the Far Side of the Moon: The Story of Apollo 11 Astronaut Michael Collins | Bea Uusma Schyffert | Emi Gunér | Swedish | hon |
| 2005 | Delacorte Press / Dell | The Shadows of Ghadames | Joëlle Stolz | Catherine Temerson | French | W |
| 2005 | Farrar, Straus and Giroux | The Crow-Girl: The Children of Crow Cove | Bodil Bredsdorff | Faith Ingwersen | Danish | hon |
| 2005 | Atheneum Books (Richard Jackson Bks) | Daniel Half Human and the Good Nazi | David Chotjewitz | Doris Orgel | German | hon |
| 2006 | Arthur A. Levine Books | An Innocent Soldier | Josef Holub | Michael Hofmann | German | W |
| 2006 | Phaidon Press | Nicholas | René Goscinny | Anthea Bell | French | hon |
| 2006 | Bloomsbury Children’s Books | When I Was a Soldier | Valérie Zenatti | Adriana Hunter | French | hon |
| 2007 | Delacorte Press / Dell | The Pull of the Ocean | Jean-Claude Mourlevat | Y. Maudet | French | W |
| 2007 | Delacorte Press / Dell | The Killer's Tears | Anne-Laure Bondoux | Y. Maudet | French | hon |
| 2007 | Hyperion / Miramax | The Last Dragon | Silvana De Mari | Shaun Whiteside | Italian | hon |
| 2008 | VIZ Media | Brave Story | Miyuki Miyabe | Alexander O. Smith | Japanese | W |
| 2008 | Milkweed Editions | The Cat: Or, How I Lost Eternity | Jutta Richter | Anna Brailovsky | German | hon |
| 2008 | Phaidon Press | Nicholas and the Gang | René Goscinny | Anthea Bell | French | hon |
| 2009 | Arthur A. Levine Books | Moribito: Guardian of the Spirit | Nahoko Uehashi | Cathy Hirano | Japanese | W |
| 2009 | Eerdmans Books for Young Readers | Garmann's Summer | Stian Hole | Don Bartlett | Norwegian | hon |
| 2009 | Amulet Books | Tiger Moon | Antonia Michaelis | Anthea Bell | German | hon |
| 2010 | Delacorte Press / Dell | A Faraway Island | Annika Thor | Linda Schenck | Swedish | W |
| 2010 | Farrar, Straus and Giroux | Eidi | Bodil Bredsdorff | Kathryn Mahaffy | Danish | hon |
| 2010 | Enchanted Lion Books | Big Wolf and Little Wolf | Nadine Brun-Cosme | Claudia Bedrick | French | hon |
| 2010 | Arthur A. Levine Books | Moribito II: Guardian of the Darkness | Nahoko Uehashi | Cathy Hirano | Japanese | hon |
| 2011 | Delacorte Press / Dell | A Time of Miracles | Anne-Laure Bondoux | Y. Maudet | French | W |
| 2011 | namelos | Departure Time | Truus Matti | Nancy Forest-Flier | Dutch | hon |
| 2011 | Atheneum Books | Nothing | Janne Teller | Martin Aitken | Danish | hon |
| 2012 | Eerdmans Books for Young Readers | Soldier Bear | Bibi Dumon Tak | Laura Watkinson | Dutch | W |
| 2012 | Delacorte Press / Dell | The Lily Pond | Annika Thor | Linda Schenck | Swedish | hon |
| 2013 | Dial Books | My Family for the War | Anne C. Voorhoeve | Tammi Reichel | German | W |
| 2013 | Graphic Universe | A Game for Swallows: To Die, To Leave, To Return | Zeina Abirached | Edward Gauvin | French | hon |
| 2013 | Eerdmans Books for Young Readers | Son of a Gun | Anne de Graaf | Anne de Graaf | Dutch | hon |
| 2014 | Enchanted Lion Books | Mister Orange | Truus Matti | Laura Watkinson | Dutch | W |
| 2014 | Enchanted Lion Books | The Bathing Costume or the Worst Vacation of My Life | Charlotte Moundlic | Claudia Zoe Bedrick | French | hon |
| 2014 | Enchanted Lion Books | My Father's Arms Are a Boat | Stein Erik Lunde | Kari Dickson | Norwegian | hon |
| 2014 | Eerdmans Books for Young Readers | The War Within These Walls | Aline Sax | Laura Watkinson | Dutch | hon |
| 2015 | Eerdmans Books for Young Readers | Mikis and the Donkey | Bibi Dumon Tak | Laura Watkinson | Dutch | W |
| 2015 | Roaring Brook Press (First Second Books) | Hidden: A Child's Story of the Holocaust | Loïc Dauvillier | Alexis Siegel | French | hon |
| 2015 | Enchanted Lion Books | Nine Open Arms | Benny Lindelauf | John Nieuwenhuizen | Dutch | hon |
| 2016 | Enchanted Lion Books | The Wonderful Fluffy Little Squishy | Beatrice Alemagna | Claudia Zoe Bedrick | French | W |
| 2016 | Seven Stories Press | Adam and Thomas | Aharon Appelfeld | Jeffrey M. Green | Hebrew | hon |
| 2016 | NorthSouth Books | Grandma Lives in a Perfume Village | Fang Suzhen | Huang Xiumin | Chinese | hon |
| 2016 | TOON Books (Candlewick Press) | Written and Drawn by Henrietta | Ricardo Liniers | Ricardo Liniers | Spanish | hon |
| 2017 | Enchanted Lion Books | Cry, Heart, But Never Break | Glenn Ringtved | Robert Moulthrop | Danish | W |
| 2017 | NorthSouth Books | As Time Went By | José Sanabria | Audrey Hall | German | hon |
| 2017 | Margaret K. McElderry Books | The Ballad of a Broken Nose | Arne Svingen | Kari Dickson | Norwegian | hon |
| 2017 | Chronicle Books | Over the Ocean | Tarō Gomi | Taylor Norman | Japanese | hon |
| 2018 | Delacorte Press / Dell | The Murderer's Ape | Jakob Wegelius | Peter Graves | Swedish | W |
| 2018 | Charlesbridge | Malala: Activist for Girls' Education | Raphaёle Frier | Julie Cormier | French | hon |
| 2018 | Eerdmans Books for Young Readers | When a Wolf is Hungry | Christine Naumann-Villemin | Eerdmans Books for Young Readers | French | hon |
| 2018 | Elsewhere Editions | You Can't Be Too Careful! | Roger Mello | Daniel Hahn | Portuguese | hon |
| 2019 | Thames & Hudson | The Fox on the Swing | Evelina Daciūtė | Translation Bureau | Lithuanian | W |
| 2019 | Yonder | Run for Your Life | Silvana Gandolfi | Lynne Sharon Schwartz | Italian | hon |
| 2019 | Graphic Universe | My Beijing: Four Stories of Everyday Wonder | Nie Jun | Edward Gauvin | French (Note: The book was originally published in Mandarin, and was translated into French. The French translation was the basis for the English translation.) | hon |
| 2019 | Enchanted Lion Books | Jerome by Heart | Thomas Scotto, illustrated by Olivier Tallec | Claudia Zoe Bedrick and Karin Snelson | French | hon |
| 2020 | Enchanted Lion Books | Brown (Note: The original publication name was Brune) | Håkon Øvreås | Kari Dickson | Norwegian | W |
| 2020 | Godwin Books/Henry Holt | The Beast Player | Nahoko Uehashi | Cathy Hirano | Japanese | hon |
| 2020 | Atheneum Books | The Distance Between Me and the Cherry Tree | Paola Peretti | Denise | Italian | hon |
| 2020 | Enchanted Lion Books | Do Fish Sleep? | Jens Raschke | Belinda Cooper | German | hon |
| 2020 | Plough Publishing House | When Spring Comes to the DMZ | Lee Uk-bae | Lee Uk-bae | Korean | hon |
| 2021 | Enchanted Lion Books | Telephone Tales (Note: The original publication name was Favole al telefono) | Gianni Rodari, illustrated by Valerio Vidali | Antony Shugaar | Italian | W |
| 2021 | HarperCollins | Catherine's War | Julia Billet, illustrated by Claire Fauvel | Ivanka Hahnenberger | French | hon |
| 2022 | Restless Books | Temple Alley Summer | Sachiko Kashiwaba, illustrated by Miho Satake | Avery Fischer Udagawa | Japanese | W |
| 2022 | Enchanted Lion Books | Coffee, Rabbit, Snowdrop, Lost | Betina Birkjaer, illustrated by Margrethe Kjaergaard | Sinéad Quirke Køngerskov | Danish | hon |
| 2022 | Elsewhere Editions | The Meadow of Fantasies | Hadi Mohammadi, illustrated by Nooshin Safakhoo | Sara Khalili | Persian/Farsi | hon |
| 2022 | Enchanted Lion Books | The Most Beautiful Story | Brynjulf Jung Tjønn, illustrated by Øyvind Torseter | Kari Dickson | Norwegian | hon |
| 2022 | Enchanted Lion Books | Sato the Rabbit (Book 1) | Yuki Ainoya | Michael Blaskowsky | Japanese | hon |
| 2022 | Levine Querido | The Sea-Ringed World: Sacred Stories of the Americas | María García Esperón, illustrated by Amanda Mijangos | David Bowles | Spanish | hon |
| 2023 | HarperCollins | Just a Girl: A True Story of World War II | Lia Levi, illustrated by Jess Mason | Sylvia Notini | Italian | W |
| 2023 | Eerdmans Books for Young Readers | Different: A Story of the Spanish Civil War | Mónica Montañés, illustrated by Eva Sánchez Gómez | Lawrence Schimel | Spanish | hon |
| 2023 | Candlewick Press | Dragonfly Eyes | Cao Wenxuan | Helen Wang | Chinese | hon |
| 2023 | Levine Querido | João by a Thread | Roger Mello | Daniel Hahn | Portuguese | hon |
| 2024 | Amulet Books | Houses with a Story: A Dragon’s Den, a Ghostly Mansion, a Library of Lost Books, and 30 More Amazing Places to Explore | Seiji Yoshida | Jan Mitsuko Cash | Japanese | W |
| 2024 | Yonder | The House of the Lost on the Cape | Sachiko Kashiwaba, illustrated by Yukiko Saito | Avery Fischer Udagawa | Japanese | hon |
| 2024 | Eerdmans Books for Young Readers | Later, When I’m Big | Bette Westera, illustrated by Mattias De Leeuw | Laura Watkinson | Dutch | hon |
| 2024 | Levine Querido | Pardalita | Joana Estrela | Lyn Miller-Lachmann | Portuguese | hon |

== Multiple awards and honors ==
E. P. Dutton and Enchanted Lion Books have won five Batchelder Awards, Delacorte Press (Dell) four. Several imprints have won three: Arthur A. Levine Books (Scholastic); Lothrop, Lee & Shepard (HarperCollins); Houghton Mifflin.

Anthea Bell's translations from Danish, French and German have won seven mentions, four Awards and three Honors. Hillel Halkin's translations from Hebrew have four awards. Translations from Greek by Edward Fenton have won three, as have translations from Dutch by Laura Watkinson. Several people have translated two Award winners.

Uri Orlev writing in Hebrew and Alki Zei writing in Greek were the authors of four and three Award-winning works, all of those translated by Halkin and Fenton respectively. Bjarne Reuter wrote two of the winners in Danish, Bibi Dumon Tak two in Dutch, and Josef Holub two in German.

Numbers of Awards and Honors by original language

| Awd | Hon | Language |
| (56) | (66) | (1968–2023) |
|---|---|---|
| 15 | 10 | German |
| 6 | 8 | Dutch |
| 6 | 5 | Japanese |
| 5 | 3 | Swedish |
| 5 | 1 | Hebrew |
| 4 | 17 | French |
| 4 | 4 | Danish |
| 3 | 3 | Italian |
| 3 | 0 | Greek |
| 2 | 4 | Norwegian |
| 1 | 3 | Spanish |
| 1 | 0 | Russian |
| 1 | 0 | Lithuanian |
| 0 | 3 | Portuguese |
| 0 | 2 | Chinese |
| 0 | 1 | Turkish |
| 0 | 1 | Korean |
| 0 | 1 | Persian/Farsi |
