= Infrastructure in Warsaw =

Warsaw has seen major infrastructural changes over the past few years amidst increased foreign investment and economic growth. The city has a much improved infrastructure with new healthcare facilities, sanitation, etc.

== Sanitation ==
=== Water supply ===
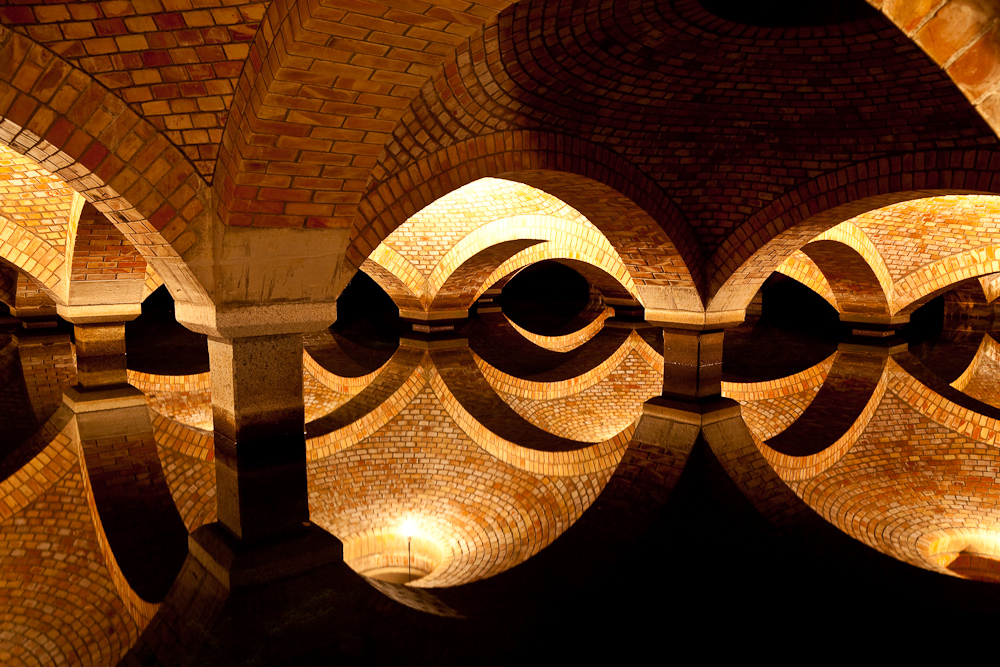
Lindley Water Filters.

Three supply systems serve Warsaw inhabitants. Wodociąg Centralny (Central Water Main) is the oldest. It was built in the 19th century. After many renovations, it is still functioning and providing water for more than half of Warsaw's residents. The other supply systems are Wodociąg Praski (Praga Water Main) and Wodociąg Północny (Northern Water Main).

=== Sewerage ===
Warsaw's sewer system was installed in the second half of the 19th century, at the same time as the water supply system. Currently the waste water collectors are 2,020 km long and serve over 90 percent of inhabitants. A new sewage treatment plant is planned for the south of the city on the left river bank.

== Health system ==
The first hospital in Warsaw was established in 1353 by duke Siemowit III and his wife Eufemia and named the Hospital of the Holy Spirit after the Holy Spirit intra muros. In 1571, the famous Wojciech Oczko, an author of extensive treatises on balneology and syphilidology, was made a doctor there. It was previously located on Piwna, Przyrynek and Konwiktorska streets, and from 1861 on Elektoralna Street, where it was destroyed during the siege of Warsaw in 1939.

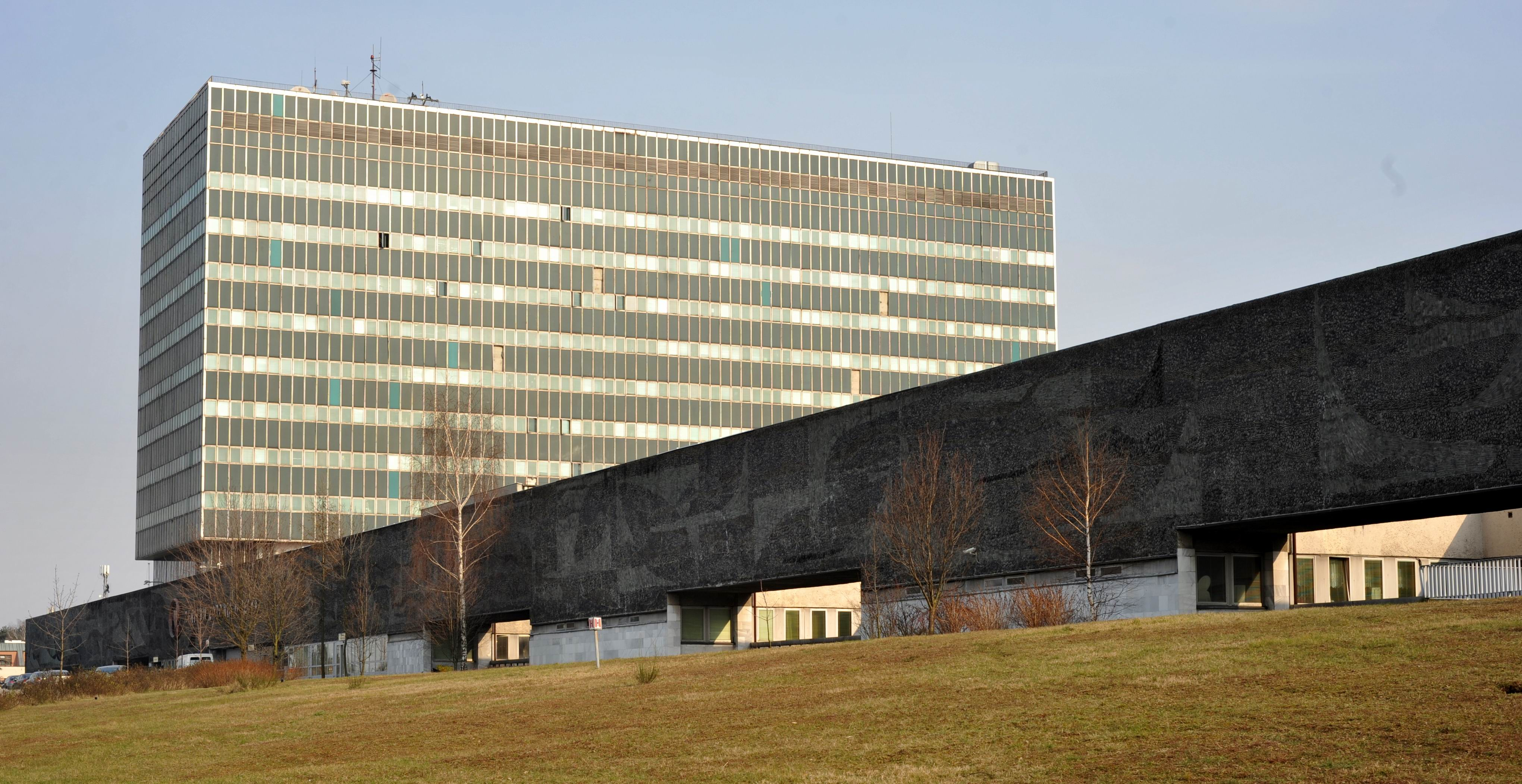
Children's Memorial Health Institute.

The Medical University of Warsaw, the largest medical school in Poland, has 16 affiliated hospitals including the largest clinical hospital in Poland - the Public Central Teaching Hospital at Banacha Street, where students are trained in almost all fields of medicine.

Warsaw is home to the Children's Memorial Health Institute (CMHI), the highest-reference hospital for all of Poland, as well as an active research and education center. CMHI was founded by Poles living in Poland and abroad in 1968. It is a huge complex of newly designed buildings, with the most up-to-date equipment and a group of leading authorities in pediatrics and their co-workers. At present, the CMHI covers an area of 20 hectares and employs almost 2,000 people, making it the largest pediatric center in Poland. Funds come from the government, health insurance and other sources.

The Maria Skłodowska-Curie Institute of Oncology is one of the largest and most modern oncological institutions in Europe. The clinical section is located in a 10-floor building with 700 beds, 10 operating theaters, an intensive care unit, several diagnostic departments, and an outpatient clinic. Each floor forms separate departments with surgical, radiotherapy, and chemotherapy wards. Each department provides the full range of combined treatment in a particular field.

Although the health care in Poland is free for persons covered by the general health insurance, it is sometimes slow. For those who wish to avoid queues of public hospitals, there are many private medical centers and hospitals in Warsaw.

== See also ==
- Street names of Warsaw
