= The Last Dragon (disambiguation) =

The Last Dragon is a 1985 martial arts musical film.

The Last Dragon may also refer to:

== Arts and literature ==
- The Last Dragon (2004 film), a British film
- The Last Dragon (novel), a 2004 children's novel by Silvana De Mari
- The Last Dragon Chronicles, a series of novels by Chris d'Lacey
- Raya and the Last Dragon, a 2021 film
- "The Last Dragon", the twelfth episode of Legend of the Dragon
- "The Last Dragon", the thirty-second episode of Mysticons

== Music ==
- The Last Dragon (soundtrack), soundtrack to the 1985 film
- The Last Dragon, a 2013 album by The Regime
- Last Dragon, a 2015 album by Sisqó, or its title track
- "Last Dragon", a 2016 song by Eric Prydz from Opus
