= Hans Richter =

Hans Richter may refer to:

- Hans Richter (conductor) (1843–1916), Austrian conductor
- Hans Richter (architect) (1882–1971), designer of the Volksbühne in Berlin and villa Heller in Ústí nad Labem
- Hans Richter (artist) (1888–1976), German-born American artist and filmmaker
- Hans Richter (actor) (1919–2008), German actor and director
- Hans Peter Richter (1926–1993), German author, wrote books for children and young adults
- Hans Werner Richter (1908–1993), German novelist and organiser of the "Group 47" writers' group
- Hans Richter (footballer) (1959–2023), East German footballer
