= Doris Orgel =

American children's writer (1929–2021

- Born: Doris Adelberg; February 15, 1929; Vienna, Austria
- Died: August 4, 2021 (aged 92)
- Education: Radcliffe College; Barnard College
- Occupation: Children's literature author
- Spouse: Shelley Orgel
- Children: 3

Doris Orgel (February 15, 1929 – August 4, 2021) was an Austrian-born American children's literature author.

== Biography ==
She was born Doris Adelberg in Vienna, Austria, on February 15, 1929. In the 1930s, she fled Vienna with her parents due to her Jewish descent. She lived in New York City and was a full-time children's author. She died August 4, 2021, aged 92.

Her book The Devil in Vienna received a Phoenix Award Honor in 1998. Her books Sarah's Room and Dwarf Long-Nose were illustrated by Hans Christian Andersen Award-winning illustrator Maurice Sendak.

She also translated children's books from German to English. Two of her translations, Nero Corleone: a Cat's Story by Elke Heidenreich and Daniel Half Human by David Chotjewitz, are Mildred L. Batchelder Honor Books, the award recognizing outstanding translated children's books.

She graduated from Hunter College High School in 1946, attended Radcliffe College from 1946 to 1948 and graduated cum laude from Barnard College in 1950. She was married to Shelley Orgel, a medical doctor specializing in psychoanalysis, and had three children.
