= Els Pelgrom =

Dutch writer of children's literature

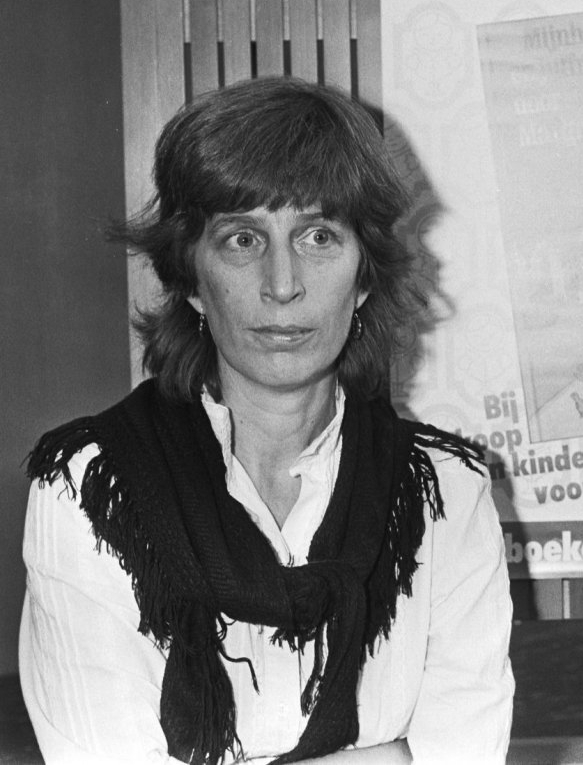
- Els Pelgrom (1983)
- Born: Else Koch; 2 April 1934 (age 92); Arnhem, Netherlands
- Occupation: Writer
- Writing career
- Language: Dutch
- Notable awards: Gouden Griffel 1977 1984 1989; Zilveren Griffel 1982 1987; Theo Thijssen-prijs 1994

Els Pelgrom (born 2 April 1934, Arnhem), pseudonym of Else Koch, is a Dutch writer of children's literature. Pelgrom is the first author to have received the Gouden Griffel award three times.

== Biography ==
=== Career ===
For some time she worked on the children's section of the Winschoter Courant. She also worked for a short period of time as teacher.

=== Children's literature ===
Pelgrom made her debut as writer in 1962 with the book Het geheimzinnige bos. Her book De kinderen van het achtste woud (1977) is considered by many to be her true debut. For this book she received the Gouden Griffel award in 1978. The book was translated into English as The Winter When Time Was Frozen by Maryka and Raphael Rudnik who won the Mildred L. Batchelder Award in 1981 for this translation. The book was translated into German by Jutta Knust as Die Kinder vom Achten Wald which was awarded the Gustav-Heinemann-Friedenspreis für Kinder- und Jugendbücher in 1983.

Pelgrom also won the Gouden Griffel for her books Kleine Sofie en Lange Wapper and De eikelvreters. Pelgrom won the Zilveren Griffel award in 1983 for Voor niets gaat de zon op and in 1988 for Het onbegonnen feest. Pelgrom also received the Vlag en Wimpel award in 1986 for De Olifantsberg and in 1987 for De straat waar niets gebeurt.

In 1994, she won the Theo Thijssen-prijs for her entire oeuvre.

In 1995, she wrote the children's book Bombaaj! which was the Kinderboekenweekgeschenk on the occasion of the Boekenweek.

The majority of Pelgrom's books have been published by Querido.

=== Illustrators and translators ===
Pelgrom's books have been illustrated by various illustrators including Margriet Heymans, Peter van Straaten and Thé Tjong-Khing. Many of Pelgrom's books have been translated into German by Mirjam Pressler and Hanni Ehlers. Some of her books have also been translated into English by Arnold Pomerans.

== Personal life ==
Pelgrom was married to Karl Pelgrom and they had three children. They separated in 1975. Pelgrom also lived for some time in Granada, Spain.

Pelgrom is a half-sister of writer and actor Herman Koch.

== Awards ==
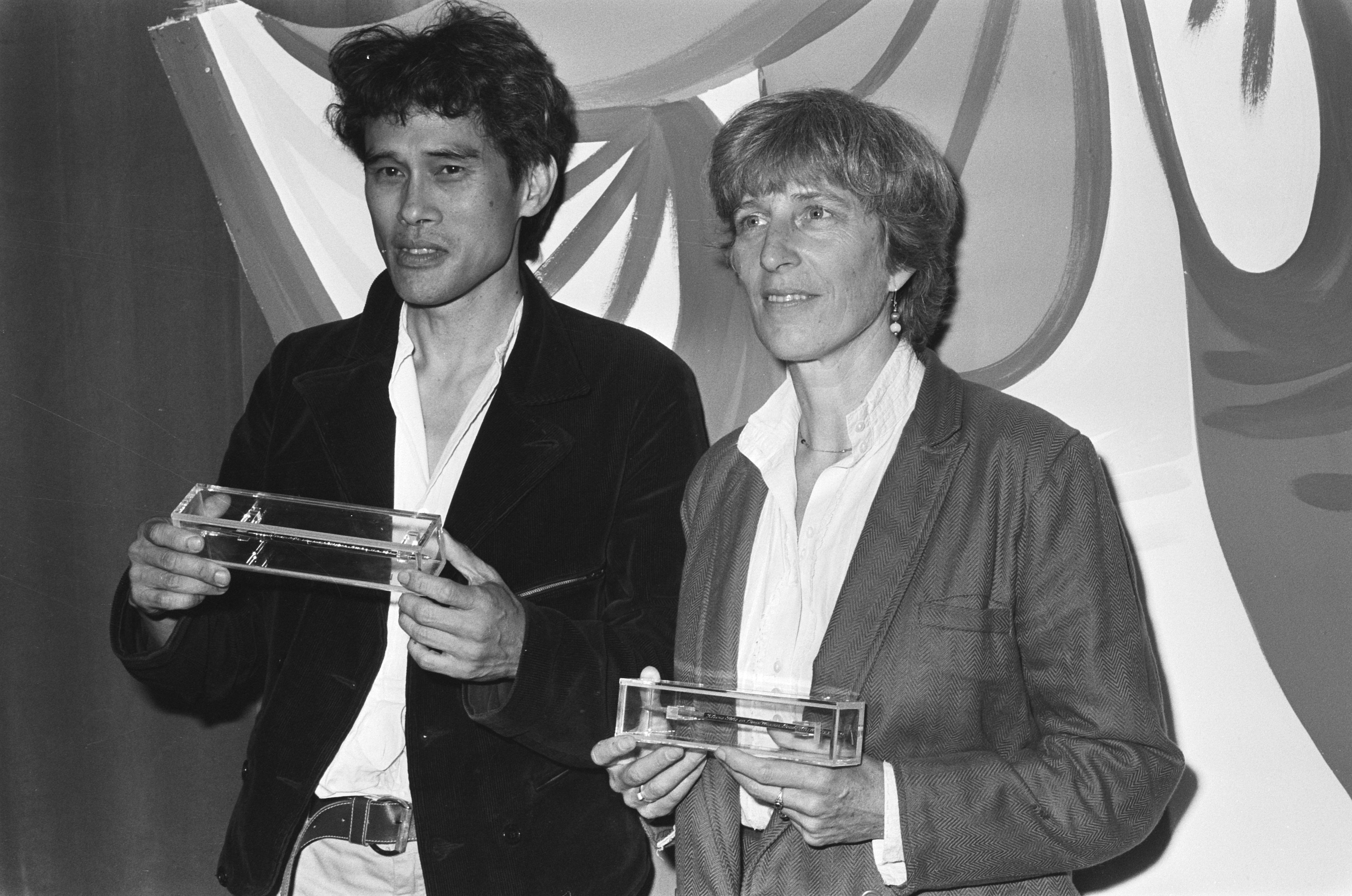
Els Pelgrom and Thé Tjong-Khing receiving the Gouden Griffel and Gouden Penseel awards respectively (1985).

- 1978: Gouden Griffel, De kinderen van het achtste woud
- 1983: Zilveren Griffel, Voor niets gaat de zon op
- 1985: Gouden Griffel, Kleine Sofie en Lange Wapper (Little Sophie and Lanky Flop)
- 1986: Deutscher Jugendliteraturpreis, Die wundersame Reise der kleinen Sofie (Little Sophie and Lanky Flop)
- 1986: Vlag en Wimpel, De Olifantsberg
- 1987: Vlag en Wimpel, De straat waar niets gebeurt
- 1988: Zilveren Griffel, Het onbegonnen feest
- 1990: Gouden Griffel, De eikelvreters
- 1994: Theo Thijssen-prijs
