= Avery Fischer Udagawa =

Japanese–English translator

Avery Fischer Udagawa is a translator of children's books from Japanese.

== Biography ==
Udagawa grew up in Kansas and studied English and Asian Studies at St. Olaf College in Minnesota. She studied at Nanzan University, Nagoya, on a Fulbright Fellowship, and at the Inter-University Center for Japanese Language Studies, Yokohama, later earning an MA in Advanced Japanese Studies from The University of Sheffield. She writes, translates, and works in international education near Bangkok. She is a campaigner for literary translation, and literary translators, especially with the Society of Children's Book Writers and Illustrators.

== Awards and honors ==
- 2024 Honor, IBBY Honor List for her translation of Temple Alley Summer, written by Sachiko Kashiwaba
- 2024 Honor, Mildred L. Batchelder Award for her translation of The House of the Lost on the Cape, written by Sachiko Kashiwaba and illustrated by Yukiko Saito.
- 2022 Winner, Mildred L. Batchelder Award for her translation of Temple Alley Summer, written by Sachiko Kashiwaba and illustrated by Miho Satake.
- 2022 Honor, Audie Award for Middle Grade Title for her translation of Temple Alley Summer, written by Sachiko Kashiwaba and narrated by Traci Kato-Kiriyama.

== Translations ==
- The House of the Lost on the Cape, by Sachiko Kashiwaba (Restless Books, 2023)
- Temple Alley Summer, by Sachiko Kashiwaba, ills. Miho Satake (Restless Books, 2021)
- J-Boys: Kazuo’s World, by Shogo Oketani (IBC Publishing, 2013; Stone Bridge Press, 2011)
- "Festival Time" by Ippei Mogami, in The Best Asian Short Stories 2018, illus. Saburo Takada (Kitaab, 2018)
- "Swing" by Ippei Mogami, in Kyoto Journal 82, May 2015
- "Mirror, Mirror", by Sachiko Kashiwaba, in A Tapestry of Colours 1: Stories from Asia (Marshall Cavendish Editions, 2021)
- "House of Trust", by Sachiko Kashiwaba, in Tomo: Friendship Through Fiction—An Anthology of Japan Teen Stories (Stone Bridge Press, 2012) https://play.google.com/store/books/details?id=b9vODwAAQBAJ
- "First Claw", by Sachiko Kashiwaba, in Words Without Borders, April 2020
- My Japan, by Etsuko Filliquet (Kaiseisha, 2017)
- Baby Chick, by Jun’ichi Kobayashi, ullus. Eigoro Futamata (original work by Kornei I. Chukovskii), (Doshinsha, 2009) - co-translated with Etsuko Nozaka
- "Inside" by Rio Shimamoto, in Inside and Other Short Fiction: Japanese Women by Japanese Women (Kodansha International, 2006)
- "The Shadow of the Orchid" by Nobuko Takagi, in Inside and Other Short Fiction: Japanese Women by Japanese Women (Kodansha International, 2006)

== See also ==
- List of translators of children's books
