= Dee White =

Australian writer

- Born: March 1964 (age 62); Melbourne, Australia
- Occupation: Writer
- Website: deescribe.com.au

Dee White is an Australian writer of children's books, short stories, poems, educational resources and freelance articles. She runs workshops for other writers and lives in regional Victoria, Australia. White also runs online writing workshops for children around the world.

== Biography ==
Dee White (née Matters) was born in March 1964 in Melbourne, Australia. Her father fled Austria as a child in 1939 during WWII and eventually settled in Australia. White has worked as an advertising copywriter and journalist. White's hobbies include drawing, painting, golf and travel.

White speaks in schools, offers workshops and has presented at conferences including the VATE (Victorian Association of Teachers of English), the Children's Book Council of Australia (CBCA) Conference (Sydney), CYA Conference (Brisbane) and the SCBWI Europolitan Conference (Amsterdam), The Sunshine Coast International Readers and Writers Festival, and the 2018 Sharjah International Book Fair. White also runs online writing workshops for children around the world.

White had wanted to write from childhood and first began to do so seriously when her children were small and they were on a long camping trip around Australia. She began with parenting and camping articles and once her children started school she turned to children's books.

In 2009, White was awarded a May Gibbs Creative Time Fellowship in Brisbane.

White is an alumna of the May Gibbs Children's literature Trust, having taken part in a residency in Brisbane in 2010.

In 2013, White won a SCBWI Nevada Mentorship and a Copyright Agency Ltd. (Australia) grant to assist with attending the annual SCBWI conference in Nevada.

In 2017 White was awarded a grant from Creative Victoria to spend a month in Paris researching her middle-grade novel Beyond Belief, inspired by the true story of Muslims at a Paris Mosque who saved Jewish children during WWII.

== Selected works ==
- Eddy Popcorn's Guide to Parent Training (Scholastic, 2020)
- Beyond Belief – Heroes of the Holocaust (Scholastic, 2020)
- Letters to Leonardo (Mazo Publishing, 2019)
- K9 Heroes – True Tales of Real Rescues (Scholastic, 2017)
- Reena's Rainbow (EK Books, 2017)
- Cupcakes for Sleeping Beauty, Plays to Read (Pearson 2016)
- Pippa's Pets – Scaredy Cat (Pearson, 2013)
- Pippa's Pets – Runaway Pony (Pearson, 2013)
- Pippa's Pets – Lost Dog (Pearson, 2013)
- Make a Finger Puppet (Pearson, 2013)
- Who Am I? (Pearson, 2013)
- I Like to Play (Pearson, 2013)
- Butterflies (Pearson, 2013)
- My Cat is Sleeping (Pearson, 2013)
- My Cat is Hiding (Pearson, 2013)
- Extreme Ed's Bike Adventures (Pearson, 2013)
- Extreme Ed's Air Adventures (Pearson, 2013)
- Tom's Dare (Pearson, 2013)
- Harry's Goldfield Adventure (Pearson, 2010)
- Letters to Leonardo (Walker Books, 2009)
- Hope for Hanna (Pearson, 2008)
- A Duel of Words (Pearson, 2008)

== Awards ==
Beyond Belief - Heroes of the Holocaust

- A CBCA Notable Book 2021
- A ScreenCraft Cinematic Book Competition Finalist 2021
