= Daniel Half Human =

2000 novel by David Chotjewitz

- First edition (German)
- Author: David Chotjewitz
- Original title: Daniel Halber Mensch
- Translator: Doris Orgel
- Language: German
- Genre: 12
- Set in: 1930s, and 1945 Hamburg
- Published: 2000's by Carlsen Verlag; 2004 by Atheneum Books
- Publication place: Germany
- Media type: Print
- Pages: 298
- ISBN: 0-689-85747-0
- OCLC: 46337404

Daniel Half Human and the Good Nazi (original German title, Daniel Halber Mensch) is a 2000 young adult literature novel by German author David Chotjewitz, translated into English by Doris Orgel. The first US edition was published in 2004 by Atheneum Books for Young Readers. The novel is set in Hamburg, Germany in flashback and forward between 1945 at the end of World War II and in the 1930s, during the rise of the Nazi party. It deals with the effects of antisemitism on two friends. It has been cited in 16 award lists, including as a Mildred L. Batchelder Honor Book.
