= The Island on Bird Street =

1981 children's book by Uri Orlev

- Hebrew edition
- Author: Uri Orlev
- Original title: האי ברחוב הציפורים
- Translator: Hillel Halkin
- Language: Hebrew
- Genre: Children's literature
- Publisher: Keter Publishing House Jeruselum Lad.
- Publication date: 1981
- Publication place: Israel
- English publication date: 1984
- Media type: Print (Hardcover)
- Pages: 162 pages
- ISBN: 0-395-33887-5
- OCLC: 10277773
- LC Class: PZ7.O633 Is 1984

The Island on Bird Street (Hebrew: האי ברחוב הציפורים; The Island on Birds Street) is a 1981 semi-autobiographical children's book by Israeli author Uri Orlev (אורי אורלב), which tells the story of a young boy, Alex, and his struggle to survive alone in a ghetto during World War II. The author won the 1996 Hans Christian Andersen Award by the University of Haifa for children's literature, largely for this book, which was translated into numerous languages and adapted into a play and a film. The English translation, by Hillel Halkin, was published in 1984.

== Plot summary ==
Alex is an 11-year-old Jewish boy living in a ghetto in German-occupied Poland during World War II with his father and their friend, Boruch. German soldiers come into the ghetto and send people to trains to be taken away (most likely to death camps). Alex and his father get separated, and soon Alex has to learn how to fend for himself in the empty ghetto by himself. As it turns out, the ghetto is not entirely empty, and he comes across various people, from neighbors to robbers, some of whom even try to help him. He finds refuge in an abandoned, bombed-out building on Bird Street (Ptasia street). The only thing he has to pass the time away with is his pet mouse Snow, the novel Robinson Crusoe and other books, and a small air vent grate overlooking the town. He has to hunt for food on his own and still stay hidden from soldiers. It is a great test for Alex to see if he can make it through tough conditions, and also wait for his father.

== Context ==
Uri Orlev in his childhood survived the Holocaust at Belsen-Bergen death camp. Through main protagonist, the author partially relive his trauma, caused by Nazi occupation of Poland. The novel included in the Holocaust curricula of middle and secondary schools.

== Adaptation to feature film ==
In 1997, the book was made into a feature film starring Jordan Kiziuk, Patrick Bergin and Jack Warden. The adaptation won the Silver Bear for an outstanding single achievement and Honourable Mention awards.

== See also ==
- Robinson Crusoes of Warsaw
