= Mildred L. Batchelder =

American librarian (1901–1998)

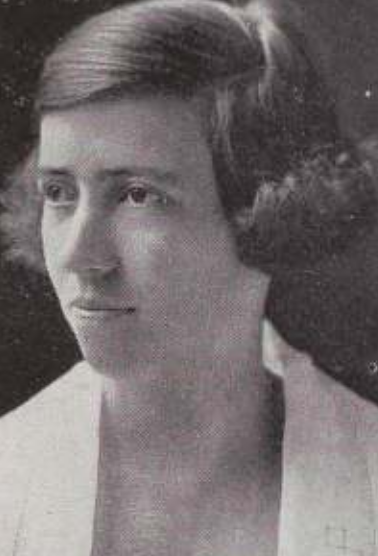
- Mildred L. Batchelder, from the 1922 Mount Holyoke College yearbook
- Born: September 7, 1901; Lynn, Massachusetts
- Died: August 25, 1998 (aged 96); Evanston, Illinois
- Occupations: Librarian, Administrator

Mildred Leona Batchelder (September 7, 1901 – August 25, 1998) was an American librarian, named by American Libraries in December 1999 as among "100 of the most important leaders we had in the 20th century". "In the mid-twentieth century, her forceful advocacy pushed children's services to the forefront of the profession and brought the best library materials and services to generations of young people." She is the namesake of the Mildred L. Batchelder Award for outstanding children's books.

== Biography ==
=== Early life ===
Mildred Batchelder was born in Lynn, Massachusetts, on September 7, 1901, to George P. and Blanche E. Batchelder. George was a businessman, Blanche, a school teacher and Mildred was the oldest of their three daughters.

The family spent their summers at "Camp", which was an island surrounded by marshlands that Mildred's father owned. Mildred called camp the "most exciting place in the world!" She spent those summers exploring and playing in the natural surroundings that would instill in her a lifelong appreciation of nature. Evenings at camp ended with the girls listening to their mother read to them as they washed the dishes.

Mildred's mother provided the "cultural and literary stimulus" for Mildred and her sisters. They would travel to Boston where they experienced theatre and films and would stock up on books before leaving the city.

Mildred was considered the academic child but wouldn't start school until she was seven years old. She was a "small and sickly child" who suffered with allergies, asthma, eczema and a suspected thyroid condition however, she seemed to adopt her mother's stoic strength despite her physical challenges. Mildred left for college when she was seventeen years old.

=== Education ===
Mildred L. Batchelder received her B.A. from Mt. Holyoke College in 1922 and her B.L.S. from New York State Library School, Albany, in 1924. As a library student at New York State Library School, Batchelder chose to go on a month-long "practice work" assignment assisting Effie L. Power in the children's department of the Cleveland Public Library. She had not previously planned on going into children's work however; this month birthed in her an excitement for children's library services, was one of the highlights of her schooling and the "crossroad" of her career.

== Career ==
Batchelder's long and productive career within the library profession began in 1924, when the inexperienced, 23-year-old held her first professional position as the Head of Children's at the Omaha Public Library in Nebraska. There, she was responsible for children's library services for 5 branches and 32 schools. After 3 years of experience and many accomplishments, she took a job as the Children's Librarian at State Teachers College in Saint Cloud, Minnesota however; her forcefulness was not well received by her boss and she was fired after only a year.

In 1928, Evanston, IL became her permanent home when she accepted a position as the librarian at Haven Middle School, which doubled as a community library in the evenings. This new role afforded her the chance to work with the public librarians and she did so enthusiastically, as it became part of her lifelong vision to see schools and public libraries working alongside one another. The American Library Association (ALA) was close in proximity to Evanston and she began building professional relationships with some of the important people at ALA.

Batchelder became part of the ALA staff in 1936, serving as the newly created School Library Specialist. She was then, after just one year, appointed chief of the School and Children's Library Division. She was extremely driven and had a special ability to motivate those around her. Because her focus was the school library initially, she discovered inadequate library facilities in more than half of the schools across the country –which put her in high gear. The field of library services to children was at a "critical time" when Batchelder began her ALA career and the profession needed strong leadership to realize the vision of the fields' former pioneers. She had a fierce temperament that was considered "tyrannical and tactless" to some and the "embodiment of professional excellence to many". "She had an unshakeable sense of herself as being 'right', and she was not afraid of being disliked. The cause itself was paramount".

One of her first goals at ALA was to get the public librarians working with the schools and she accomplished that on many levels. Batchelder traveled around the country meeting and making connections with librarians and with many national leaders in Washington, D.C. These contacts would serve her well over the next 30 years at ALA and she wasn't reluctant to use those contacts to achieve her goals. Batchelder was said to be a "catalyst of magical proportions".

Racism was an issue that Batchelder was very passionate about. It outraged her that African American children weren't provided the same privileges that were afforded to white children. She fought hard for the rights of minorities and women and was enraged when the keynote speaker of an ALA meeting was asked to use the service elevator because she was black. She was instrumental in bringing this racism to light and in keeping the ALA conferences from taking place in Southern states for 20 years.

In 1937, Batchelder teamed up with Carl Milam and Herbert Putnam to create what now might be considered a prophetic prediction of the "Library of Tomorrow." Batchelder predicted films, microfilm and other mediums as well as the use of interlibrary loans for such materials. Peggy Sullivan, who was the executive director of the ALA, said, "She led the way in incorporating nonprint materials into libraries". She took these predictions and spent her career bringing them to fruition. Batchelder was appointed as staff liaison to the visual methods committee and asked the State Department for any leftover WWII A/V equipment for library use. In the midst of her hard work and dedication, she suffered with chronic and painful arthritis but she was determined to not let her pain distract her from her goals.

Batchelder pioneered multiculturalism in children's literature. In her mind, books were essential to a democracy and to global peace efforts, hence, in 1937, she began her first international effort called the Latin American Project. This project would reveal a great need for literature in Central America and Batchelder believed that by providing translated books to and from all over the world, understanding on the international level would increase. She wanted to make sure that good books from all over the world were accessible to children in their own language. The Mildred L. Batchelder Award was created in 1966, in her honor. It recognizes an American publisher that translates an outstanding book from another language into English.

Batchelder retired in 1966 at the age of 65. Her lifelong companion was Margaret Nicholsen. Mildred Batchelder died on August 25, 1998, as a resident of the Swedish Retirement Association home in Evanston, IL. She was 96 years old.

== Works ==
A selection of some of Batchelder's written works include:

- 1939. The library of tomorrow. Emily Miller Danton (Ed.), School library service: 1970 (pp. 133–141). Chicago: American Library Association.
- 1946. Library extension. Carleton B. Joeckel (Ed.), Rural schools and the public library (pp. 108–125). Chicago: University of Chicago Press.
- Batchelder, Mildred L. (January 1953). "Public Library Influence on School Libraries". Library Trends. 1 (3): 271–285.
- 1969. Public library trustees in the nineteen-sixties. Chicago: American Library Trustee Association
- 1984. Stepping Away from Tradition: Children's Books of the Twenties and Thirties. Sybille A. Jagusch (Ed.), The leadership network in children's librarianship: a remembrance (pp. 71–120). New York: Young Scott Books.

== Awards ==
- Grolier award, ALA 1966
- Batchelder Award established in 1966 recognizing an outstanding book in a foreign language that had been translated into English by an American publisher.
- Constance Lindsay Skinner Award of the Women's National Book Association, 1967
