= Uri Orlev =

Polish-Israeli children's writer and translator (1931–2022)

- אורי אורלב
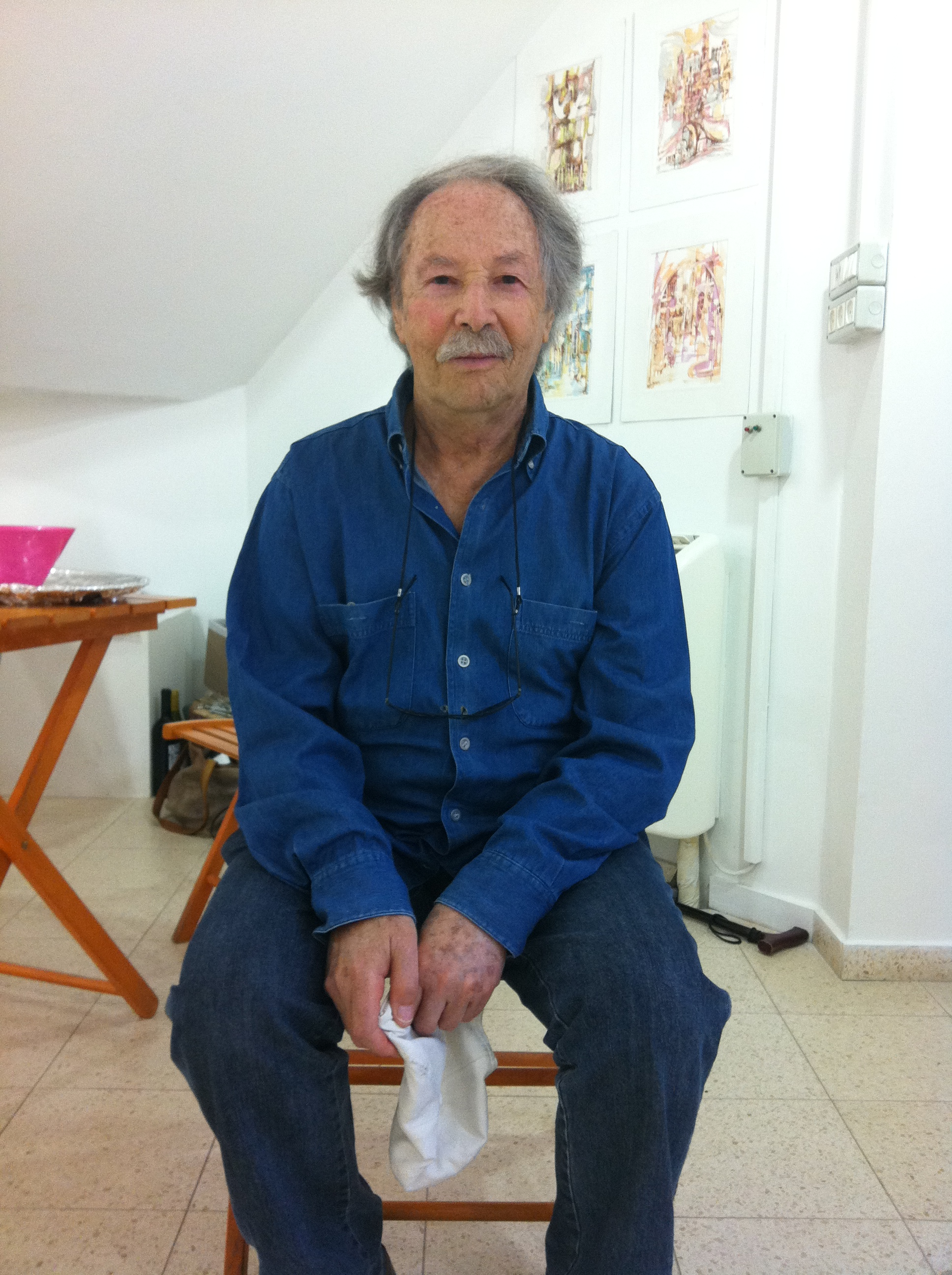
- Born: 24 February 1931; Warsaw, Poland
- Died: 26 July 2022 (aged 91); Israel
- Citizenship: Israeli, Polish
- Occupations: Writer and translator
- Children: 3, including his son Itamar Orlev
- Writing career
- Language: Polish, Hebrew
- Notable works: The Island on Bird Street, Run, Boy, Run and The Lead Soldiers
- Notable awards: Hans Christian Andersen Award (1996); Bialik Prize (2006)

Uri Orlev (Hebrew: אורי אורלב; 24 February 1931 – 26 July 2022) born Jerzy Henryk Orłowski, was a Polish-born Israeli children's author and translator. He received the Hans Christian Andersen Award in 1996 for his "lasting contribution to children's literature", the Prime Minister's Prize for Hebrew Literary Works in 1972 and the Bialik Prize for literature in 2006.

== Biography ==
Uri Orlev was born in 1931 in Warsaw, Poland, the son of a physician. During World War II, his father was taken captive by the Russians and he lived with his mother in the Warsaw Ghetto until she was killed by the Nazis. A relative hid him and his brother in the ghetto until he was caught by the Germans and deported to the Bergen-Belsen concentration camp in 1943. As a prisoner in Bergen-Belsen, he wrote and recited poetry which would later be published by Yad Vashem in 2005. He survived the Holocaust and was liberated by the British Army in 1945. He and his brother emigrated to Israel and were placed in kibbutz Ginegar. They were joined by their father in 1954. After finishing high school on the kibbutz, Orlev served in the Israel Defense Forces as an infantryman. Upon completing his regular military service, Orlev returned to the kibbutz and began working in the cowsheds. He continued to serve as a reservist and subsequently fought in the Suez Crisis, Six-Day War, and Yom Kippur War.

While living and working at Ginegar, Orlev began imagining short stories. He typically spent his weekends travelling to and from Haifa to watch movies there along with a German-born kibbutznik named Shlomo. During their bus rides, Orlev told Shlomo his stories, who urged him to write them down. After writing a rough draft, Orlev was granted permission by the kibbutz to spend a year with the family of Eliyahu Soloveitchik, a man he'd met in Bergen-Belsen who was living near Haifa. While there, he continued writing his manuscript, which would become his book The Lead Soldiers. He returned to Ginegar where he resumed his cowshed work and had the book published in 1956.

In 1968, Orlev and his family moved to the Yemin Moshe neighborhood of Jerusalem. He began writing children's literature as a profession and ended up publishing over 30 books, which are often biographical, about his childhood during the Holocaust or his early years in Israel, and from an accessible perspective for children. His books have been translated from Hebrew into 36 languages. Among his more famous works are Run, Boy, Run, The Island on Bird Street and The Lead Soldiers.

He was also a translator of Polish literature into Hebrew, such as Quo Vadis by Henryk Sienkiewicz.

Orlev appeared in the documentary film "Life is Strange" where he was interviewed about his books and life before World War II.

Orlev was twice married and had two sons, a daughter, and four grandchildren. One of his sons, Itamar Orlev, is also a writer and made his debut with the novel Bandit in 2015.

He died on 26 July 2022.

== Awards and critical acclaim ==
The biennial Hans Christian Andersen Award conferred by the International Board on Books for Young People is the highest recognition available to a writer or illustrator of children's books. Orlev received the writing award in 1996. The jury stated:

Uri Orlev's experience as a Jewish boy in war-torn Poland is the background of this outstanding writer for children. Whether his stories are set in the Warsaw ghetto or his new country Israel, he never loses the perspective of the child he was. He writes at a high literary level, with integrity and humor, in a way which is never sentimental, exhibiting the skill to say much in few words. Uri Orlev shows how children can survive without bitterness in harsh and terrible times.

In 1972, he received the Prime Minister's Prize for Hebrew Literary Works. In 2006, he was awarded the Bialik Prize for literature (jointly with Ruth Almog and Raquel Chalfi).

In the U.S., four books by Orlev have won the Batchelder Award in English-language translations by Hillel Halkin published by Houghton Mifflin. The annual American Library Association award recognizes the "children's book considered to be the most outstanding of those books originally published in a foreign language in a foreign country, and subsequently translated into English and published in the United States". The four American titles were The Island on Bird Street, The Man from the Other Side, The Lady with the Hat, and Run, Boy, Run, published from 1984 to 2003 by Houghton Mifflin, eventually by its Walter Lorraine Books imprint.

== Published works ==
[clarification needed]

Book name	Hebrew name	Year	Publisher
Literature
Till Tomorrow	עד מחר	1958	Am Oved
The Last Summer Vacation	חופשת הקיץ האחרונה	1968	Daga
Books for children and young adults
The Lead Soldiers	חיילי עופרת	1956	Sifriyat Po'alim
The Thing in the Dark	חיית החושך	1976	Am Oved
It's Hard to Be a Lion	קשה להיות אריה	1979	Am Oved
The Island on Bird Street	האי ברחוב הציפורים	1981	Keter
The Wings Turn	תור הכנפיים	1981	Massada
Big Brother	אח בוגר	1983	Keter
The Dragon's Crown	כתר הדרקון	1986	Keter
The Man from the Other Side	האיש מן הצד האחר	1988	Keter
The Lady with the Hat	הגברת עם המגבעת	1990	Keter
Lydia, Queen of Palestine	לידיה מלכת ארץ ישראל	1991	Keter
A Mouthful of Meatball	קציצה מהצהריים	1995	Keter
Last of Kin	רחוקי משפחה	1996	Keter
The Sandgame	משחק החול	1996	Keter
The Wandering Family	המשפחה הנודדת	1997	Keter
The Song of the Whales	שירת הלוויתנים	1997	Keter
Run, Boy, Run (film adaption)	רוץ, ילד, רוץ	2001	Keter
Poems from Bergen-Belsen (1944)	שירים מברגן-בלזן	2005	Yad VaShem
Picture books
The Big-Little Girl illustrated by Jacky Gleich	קטנה-גדולה	1977	Keter
Noon Thoughts	מחשבות צהריים	1978	Sifriyat Po'alim
A Hole in the Head	משגעת פילים	1979	Keter
Siamina illustrated by David Gerstein	סיאמינה	1979	Am Oved
The Lion Shirt / A Lion for Michael illustrated by Jacky Gleich	חולצת האריה	1979	Massada
The Black Cloud	הענן השחור	1979	Massada
How Mr. Cork Made the Brain Work	מעשה במנוח שהפעיל את המוח	1979	Massada
The Good-Luck Pacifier illustrated by Jacky Gleich	מוצץ המזל	1980	Am Oved
Granny Knits illustrated by Ora Eytan	סבתא סורגת	1980	Massada
Mr. Mayor	ראש העיר תן לשיר	1980	Massada
How to Be Four	מסע לגיל ארבע	1985	Am Oved
On the Wrong Side of the Bed	על צד שמאל	1985	Keter
Hairy Tuesday illustrated by Jacky Gleich	חפיפת ראש	1988	Keter

== Awards ==
- 1992: National Jewish Book Award for The Man From the Other Side
