= Aline Sax =

Belgian children's writer

- Born: 1984 (age 41–42) Antwerp, Belgium
- Occupation: Author
- Education: University of Antwerp (PhD, history)
- Genre: Children's and young adult literature
- Notable awards: National Jewish Book Awards

Aline Sax (born 1984, Antwerp, Belgium) is a Belgian author of historical children's and young adult literature. In addition to writing, she works as a historian and translates novels from English and German to Dutch. All of her novels are historical novels, capturing a wide range of themes and historical periods. Her books are written in Dutch, but have been translated into German, Danish, Swedish, French, Korean, Arabic and English. She has been nominated for and won several literary prizes.

Sax has a master's degree and has received her PhD in History from the University of Antwerp.

Sax published her first novel, Mist over het strand, with Clavis in 2001, when she was 17 years old. The novel is about two German child soldiers at the Normandy beaches in June 1944.

The War Within These Walls, translated by Laura Watkinson, was published in the United States in October 2013, with illustrations by Caryl Strzelecki. Heavily illustrated, the novel dramatically captures the brutal reality of the Warsaw Ghetto during World War II. The story is about a young Jew's struggle to survive and his participation in the 1943 uprising. Kirkus Reviews called it an "unrelenting, heart-rending insight into the hell that the Nazis created" that is "gripping, powerful, shattering". Kirkus Reviews and Publishers Weekly included it among their lists of the best books of 2013. It won the National Jewish Book Award for Children's and Young Adult Literature, the silver medal of the Sydney Taylor Book Award, and the Batchelder Honor Award of the American Library Association.

In 2025, she won de Boon for Children's and youth literature for Wat ons nog rest.

== Publications ==
=== Standalone books ===
- Sax, Aline (2001). Mist over het strand. Clavis.
- Sax, Aline (2002). Duivelsvlucht. Clavis.
- Sax, Aline (2004). De gebroken harp. Clavis.
- Sax, Aline (2005). Geen stap terug. Clavis.
- Sax, Aline (2007). De Hond van Roosevelt. Altiora Averbode.
- Sax, Aline (2010). De laatste reis. Clavis.
- Sax, Aline (2013) [2011]. De kleuren van het getto [The War Within These Walls]. Translated by Watkinson, Laura. Illustrated by Caryl Strzelecki. Eerdmans.
- Sax, Aline (2012). Voor Vlaanderen, Volk En Führer. Manteau.
- Sax, Aline (2013). Het meisje en de soldaat. Illustrated by Ann De Bode. De Eenhoorn.
- Sax, Aline; Vandebroek, Hannelore; Raats, Jonas; Mahieu, Maarten (2014). Bezette kust. Leven in de schaduw van de Atlantikwall. Hannibal.
- Sax, Aline (2015). Grensgangers [Dutch]. Davidsfonds.
- Sax, Aline (2018). De lantaarnaansteker. Illustrated by Ann De Bode. Eenhoorn.
- Sax, Aline (2020). De jongen op het dak. Illustrated by Sassafras De Bruyn. De Eenhoorn.
- Sax, Aline (2021). Uit het niets. Davidsfonds.
- Sax, Aline (2023). Wat ons nog rest. Infodok.
- Sax, Aline (2025). Negentien Negentien. Ambo|Anthos.

=== Adrian books ===
- Sax, Aline (2006). Wij, twee jongens. Clavis.
- Sax, Aline (2007). Schaduwleven. Clavis.
