= David Chotjewitz =

German writer and theatre director

David Chotjewitz (born 14 May 1964 in Berlin) is a German writer and theatre director who lives in Hamburg.

== Life ==
In 1967, his family moved to Rome, where Chotjewitz grew up until 1973. He attended the Italian primary school and later the German school of Rome. In 1973, he moved with his parents and brother to the small north Hessian village of Kruspis. He attended school in Bad Hersfeld until 1981, but left without receiving his diploma.

In 1982, he received formal vocational training from the print publisher Weismann in Munich and in spring of 1984, from the Rowohlt publishing house in Reinbek. He was married in 1983 and his daughter, Sarah, was born the same year. His first literary book publication, the collection, Frühreif - Texte aus der Plastiktüte, appeared in the spring of 1984. He wrote his first radio play, Geduld Holfstätter oder Der Erste Kuß, in 1987. In 1988, he began to translate a novel by Norma Klein, for the Frankfurt publisher, Alibaba. In the 1990s, Chotjewitz worked with independent theatre companies in Hamburg and as an assistant director at the Deutsches Schauspielhaus in Hamburg, as well as at the Burgtheater in Vienna.

From 1992 to 1994, he studied with the Javanese dance and performance teacher, Suprapto Suryodarmo in Java - see Amerta Movement. In the following years, he co-operated with the Healing Theatre in Cologne and the Julia Pascal Company in London. In 1994, his novel about Albert Einstein, Das Abenteuer des Denkens (The Adventure of Thinking), was published and received a lot of attention. It has been reprinted several times, last by the Hamburg publisher, Carlsen Verlag. His award-winning novel for young people, Daniel Halber Mensch, was also published in the United States by an imprint of Simon & Schuster as Daniel Half Human and has been quite successful there.

In 1999, Chotjewitz produced his first theatre work, Der einäugige Karpfen, based on a story by Kenzaburō Ōe. In 2000, he founded the theatre project, "Theater: Playstation", which staged musical theatre projects such as BLUT on the DANCEFLOOR (BLOOD on the DANCE FLOOR, in a techno-disco) and STIRB, POPSTAR, STIRB (POPSTAR MUST DIE), in cooperation with Kampnagel Hamburg.

In the summer of 2007, he started the project, BEHÖRDE für LIEBLINGSLIEDER (MINISTRY for FAVORITE SONGS). Projects planned for 2008 include a new biographical novel about the young Goethe and a project with youths in Colombia.

Chotjewitz has received awards such as the literature prize of the city Hamburg in 1996, a grant from the Stiftung Preußische Seehandlung in 1997, and a grant from the Stuttgarter Schriftstellerhaus in 2006. "Daniel Half Human" received in the US, among others, a Mildred L. Batchelder Award (Honor Book). His novel Crazy Diamond, about a teenaged rockstar who dies under unclear circumstances, was published in the United States in April 2008.

== Works ==
- Frühreif - Texte aus der Plastiktüte, Munich 1984
- Der erste Kuß oder Geduld, Hofstätter, radio play, Süddeutscher Rundfunk 1987
- Bücher waren ihr Schicksal, radio play, Westdeutscher Rundfunk 1988
- Mitten in der Masse, radio play, Norddeutscher Rundfunk 1989
- Das große Schweigen, radio play, Norddeutscher Rundfunk 1992
- Marie ist tot, das Radio ist aus..., radio play, Radio Bremen 1993
- Daniel - Der kindliche Held, radio play, Radio Bremen 1994
- Das Abenteuer des Denkens, Roman über Albert Einstein, novel, Frankfurt 1994
- Tödliche Safari, Roman, novel, Frankfurt 1995
- Karl Marx - Roman aus dem Leben eines jungen Philosophen, novel, Frankfurt 1996
- Daniel Halber Mensch, novel for young people, Hamburg 2000 (as Daniel Half Human, New York 2003)
- Javanische Schatten, radio play, NDR 2001
- Mr. Pitiful - Das Leben des Otis Redding, radio feature, SDR 2002
- Crazy Diamond, novel, Hamburg 2005, New York 2008

== Theater works ==
- Der einäugige Karpfen, based on a story by Kenzaburo Oe, Hamburg 2000
- Die Traumwandler, Hamburg 2001
- BLUT on the DANCEFLOOR, Hamburg 2002
- STIRB, POPSTAR, STIRB, Hamburg 2003
- Boys don't Cry, Hamburg 2005
- Daniel Halber Mensch, Hamburg 2006

== Translations ==
- Norma Klein: Familienbande 1988
- Norma Klein: Daddy's Darling 1989
- Norma Klein: Der Weg zurück 1989
- Norma Klein: Madison oder Die Freiheit der Jugen 1990
- Norma Klein: Leda oder die Anfänge der Liebe 1991
- Edith Konnecky: Allegra Maud Goldmann 1992
- Hatty Naylor: Im Pappkarton (radio play) 1992
- Slelagh Stephenson: Fünffaches Schweigen (radio play) 2003
- Doris Orgel: Daniel Half Human 2004

== Reviews in the internet ==
- English text about Daniel Halber Mensch on the website of New Books in German
- Review by a young reader about Crazy Diamond in German
- Review of the Einstein novel in German

Doris Orgel (from Daniel Half Human and the Good Nazi)
