= Alki Zei =

Greek writer (1923–2020)

- Born: 15 December 1923; Platia Koliatsou, Athens, Kingdom of Greece
- Died: 27 February 2020 (aged 96); Ampelokipoi, Athens, Greece
- Occupation: Writer
- Spouse: Giorgos Sevastikoglou (m. 1945; died 1990)
- Website: www.alkizei.com

Alki Zei (Greek: Άλκη Ζέη; 15 December 1923 – 27 February 2020) was a Greek novelist and children's writer.

== Biography ==
Alki Zei was born on 15 December 1923 in the Platia Koliatsou neighbourhood of Athens. She studied in the philosophy school of Athens University, the Drama School of the Athens Odeion, and in the screenwriting department of the Moscow Cinema Institute. From 1954 to 1964 she lived in the Soviet Union as a political refugee. In 1964 she and her family returned to Greece, but they all left again when the Greek junta seized power in 1967. That time she stayed in Paris, returning only after the dictatorship fell in 1974.

Zei took up writing very young. During her early years at junior high school she started writing plays for puppet theatre. Her first novel, The Tiger in the Shop Window (a.k.a. Wildcat Under Glass), (1963) was inspired by her childhood spent in Samos and is semi-autobiographical. This was followed by a series of books for children, and in 1987 by her first novel for adults, Achilles Fiancee. Her books have been translated into numerous languages.

Her young adult novel Constantina and her spiders (a.k.a. Tina's Web) won the Greek IBBY prize for the best book for older children, and Alki Zei was nominated as a candidate for the 2004 Hans Christian Andersen Award for Writing and Astrid Lindgren Memorial Award for Literature. The Mildred L. Batchelder Award was granted for the translation to English and publishing in the United States of Wildcat Under Glass (1970), Petros' War (1974), and The Sound of the Dragon's Feet (1980).

Zei died at her home in the Ampelokipoi neighbourhood of Athens on 27 February 2020, at age 96.

== Works ==
- The Purple Umbrella [L'Ombre Mauve, French translation]
- Grandpa the Liar (O Pseftis Pappous)
- Near the Railway Tracks (Κοντά στις ράγες)
- The Tiger in the Shop Window (a.k.a. Wildcat Under Glass) / Το Καπλάνι της Βιτρίνας (1963)
- Petros' War / Ο μεγάλος περίπατος του Πέτρου (1971)
- Achilles' Fiancée / Η αρραβωνιαστικιά του Αχιλλέα (1987) [English translation by G. Holst-Warhaft 1991]
- Uncle Plato / Ο θείος Πλάτων (1975)
- Hannibal's Shoes / Τα παπούτσια του Αννίβα (1979)
- Constantina and her Spiders (a.k.a. Tina's Web) / Η Κωνσταντίνα και οι αράχνες της (2002) [English translation by J. Thornley 2007]

== Awards ==
- Literary Prize ("Prix Littéraire des Jeunes Européens", 2010 France) for Granda the liar
- Commandeur de l'Ordre des Arts et des Lettres, 2015 France
- Gold Cross, Order of Honour, 2015 Greece
