= Pilar Molina Llorente =

Spanish children's literature writer (born 1943)

- Born: 11 December 1943 (age 82); Madrid, Spain
- Occupations: Writer, translator
- Awards: Mildred L. Batchelder Award (1994); Edebé Award for Children's and Young Adult Literature (2013)

Pilar Molina Llorente (born 11 December 1943) is a Spanish children's literature writer. Among other honors, in 2013 she received the Edebé Award for Children's and Young Adult Literature for Tesa.

She holds a licentiate in Fine Arts, with studies in music, philology, and psychology. She has translated several children's and young adult works from Italian and English into Spanish.

Some of her books have been illustrated by Fuencisla del Amo de la Iglesia.

== Awards ==
- 1964: Doncel Novel Award for Ut y las estrellas
- 1972: Doncel Biography Award for El terrible florentino
- 1973: Comisión Católica Española de la Infancia (CCEI) Award for El terrible florentino
- 1978: Finalist for El Barco de Vapor Award for El mensaje de maese Zamaor
- 1984: Honorable mention for the CCEI for Patatita
- 1994: Honorable mention for the CCEI for La sombra de la daga
- 1994: Mildred L. Batchelder Award for El Aprendiz
- 2013: Edebé Award for Children's and Young Adult Literature for Tesa

== Works ==
- Ut y las estrellas (1964)
- El terrible florentino (1973)
- Romualdo el grillo (1974)
- Carrousel 5 (1976)
- El mensaje de Maese Zamaor (1981)
- Patatita (1983)
- El parque de papel: poemas (1984)
- La visita de la Condesa (1987)
- El largo verano de Eugenia Mestre (1987)
- Aura gris (1988)
- El aprendiz (1989)
- Piñata: Libro del profesor (1990)
- La sombra de la daga (1993)
- Navidad, el regreso de Eugenia Mestre (1994)
- ¿Quién pasa primero? (1997)
- Pálpito de Sol (2001)
- Hora de Siesta (2006)
- A de alas, a de abuela (2012)
- Tesa. El despacho de don Baltasar de Garciherreros (2013)
