= Women's National Book Association =

The Women's National Book Association (WNBA) was established in 1917 to promote the role of women in the community of the book. The organization includes 12 active chapters in the United States, as well as network members outside the regional chapters. WNBA is a broad-based, 501(c)(3) non-profit organization with a longstanding history of literary activism. It accepts corporate sponsorships, and offers three distinguished national awards.

== History ==
The organization started in 1917, when women in the book industry were excluded from joining the professional organization, the Bookseller's League. Twenty-one women met in New York at The Sunwise Turn bookshop on November 13, 1917, and founded the Women's National Association of Booksellers and Publishers - soon to become known as the Women's National Book Association - as an organization to support and give voice to women in the book industry. The first President was Pauline Sherwood, of Sherwood's Book Store.

The early organization's unique characteristic was that membership was open to women in all facets of the book world-publishers, booksellers, librarians, authors, illustrators, agents, production people – the only criterion being that part of their income must come from books. Almost 100 years later, with ten chapters spanning the country from Boston to San Francisco and with Network members across the country, the Women's National Book Association continues its mission to champion the role of women in the world of words, with women and men who are professionals in the publishing industry, who are authors, or are advocates of literature as members. The organization's newsletter, The Bookwoman, was created in 1936 by Constance Lindsay Skinner and has had continuous publication to the current date.

== Chapters ==
There are eleven active chapters in the United States:

- Atlanta (2016)
- Boston (1954)
- Charlotte (2009)
- Greater Lansing (2017)
- Los Angeles (1975)
- Nashville (1955)
- New Orleans (2011)
- New York City (1917)
- Greater Philadelphia (2016)
- San Francisco (1968)
- South Florida (2015)
- Washington, D.C. (1978)

== Awards and contests ==
=== WNBA Award ===
The WNBA Award is presented by the members of the Women's National Book Association to "a living American woman who derives part or all of her income from books and allied arts, and who has done meritorious work in the world of books beyond the duties or responsibilities of her profession or occupation." The award was formerly known as the Constance Lindsay Skinner Award.

Winners have included Mildred C. Smith, co-editor of Publishers' Weekly (1944); Emily P. Street, Secretary of William Morrow & Company and Director of Sales and Advertising (1947); May Massee, Director of Doubleday's Books for Children department from 1923 to 1933, and Director of the Junior Book Department at The Viking Press from 1933 until she retired (1950); Dorothy Canfield Fisher, author of Understood Betsy and one of the members of the original panel of judges for the Book-of-the Month Club (1951); Fanny Butcher, Literary Editor of the Chicago Tribune (1955); Bertha Mahony, launched the first Bookmobile and founded The Horn Book (1955); Edith Hamilton, author of Mythology (1958); Pearl Buck, Winner of the Pulitzer Prize in 1931 for The Good Earth (1960); Eleanor Roosevelt (1961); Rachel Carson, author of Silent Spring (1963); Blanche Knopf, president of Alfred A. Knopf, Inc. (1966); Mildred L. Batchelder, head of the American Library Association's office for library service to children and young people (1967); Ursula Nordstrom, Children's book editor (1972); Margaret K. McElderry, Children's book editor (1975); Barbara Tuchman, author of The Guns of August and a Pulitzer Prize Winner; Barbara Bush (1990); Doris Kearns Goodwin, author of Team of Rivals (1998); Patricia Schroeder, Former Congresswoman and President and CEO of the Association of American Publishers (2000); Nancy Pearl, author, librarian, book reviewer, and radio talk show personality (2004); Ann Patchett, author of Bel Canto and owner of Parnassus Books (2012); Amy King, poet and professor and executive board member of VIDA: Women in Literary Arts (2015); Carla Hayden, 14th Librarian of Congress and Louise Erdrich, author of The Round House and owner of Birchbark Books in Minneapolis (2017); and Judy Blume, children's book author and owner of Books and Books in Key West (2025).

=== Pannell Award ===
This award was established by the organization in 1981 in honor of a longtime member, Lucile Micheels Pannell. Pannell was a well-known librarian, author, and manager of the Hobby Horse Bookshop at Carson, Pirie, Scott, and Company department store in Chicago. Pannell founded the Chicago Children's Reading Table and was the first bookseller to win the WNBA Award in 1949. The Pannell Award recognizes the work of booksellers, both general booksellers and those specializing in children's books, who creatively promote and encourage public interest in books.

=== Eastman Grant ===
The Eastman Grant is a cash award given annually by the Women's National Book Association to a state library association based in a state in which the organization has a chapter. The Eastman Grant funds librarian professional development and training. The grant honors Ann Heidbreder Eastman, a longtime member of the organization and national president, as well as a member of the American Librarian Association, where she held many leadership roles.

=== WNBA annual writing competition ===
After years of celebrating published authors, extraordinary book women and others in the field, WNBA decided it is time to celebrate emerging writers. In 2012, the first annual writing contest was announced, for fiction and poetry.

== United Nations affiliation ==
The Women's National Book Association has been a non-governmental organization (NGO) member of the United Nations since 1959. An NGO is defined as "any non-profit, voluntary citizens' group that is organized on a local, national or international level. Task-oriented and driven by people with a common interest, NGOs perform a variety of services and humanitarian functions, bring citizens' concerns to governments, monitor policies and encourage political participation at the community level."

The Association role ranges from emergency-relief donations (Indian Ocean tsunami 2004; Myanmar cyclone disaster 2008; Haiti Earthquake 2010) to annual fund-raising (Trick-or-Treat for UNICEF), from UNICEF USA campaign-awareness (The UNICEF Tap Project, Believe in Zero—24,000) to literacy advocacy for women and girls (UNICEF's Afghanistan Education Alliance).

== National Reading Group Month ==
The Women's National Book Association launched National Reading Group Month in October 2007 as the premier event of its 90th anniversary. National Reading Group Month augments the WNBA's mission to promote the value of books and reading. Through this initiative the organization aims to foster the values reading groups encourage: camaraderie, enjoyment of shared reading, and appreciation of literature and reading as conduits for transmitting culture and advancing civic engagement. The mission of National Reading Group Month is to:

- Increase public awareness of the joy and value of shared reading
- Provide a time for reading groups to celebrate their accomplishments and plan for the future
- Provide opportunities for individuals to join an existing reading group or start a new one
- Encourage libraries, bookstores, and organizations to host special reading group events

In addition, the National Reading Group Month creates an annual Great Group Reads list of recommended titles for book discussion groups.

== Membership ==
Membership in the Women's National Book Association is stated as being open to anyone interested in the mission of the organization. Ten chapters of the organization are active. Each offers programs, events, and support through chapter affiliation through an annual membership fee established by each chapter. For those outside the location of a chapter, network membership is offered. Corporate or Sustaining Memberships are also available.
