= Hans Peter Richter =

German author

Hans Peter Richter (28 April 1925 – 19 November 1993) was a German author. He was born in Cologne, Germany, and went to Volksschule and Aufbauschule. He took part in World War II as a soldier with the highest military rank of lieutenant from 1942 to 1945. He lost his left arm because of an injury in the war. Richter studied psychology and sociology in Cologne, Bonn and Mainz from 1948 to 1952. He achieved his promotion as Dr. rer. pol. at the University of Tübingen in 1952. He focused on independent research activities for business enterprises and broadcasting corporations from 1953 to 1973.

Richter wrote many books for children and young adults. Notable among them is the novel Friedrich (in German Damals war es Friedrich), about the persecution of Jews in Germany during The Holocaust. Friedrich (published in 1970) was the subject of an American Library Association 1972 ALSC Batchelder Award Richter received the Selbaldus Youth Book Award (Sebaldus-Jugendbuchpreis) and the Woodward School Book Award for this book.

Some of his most notable books are:

- Friedrich (German original title: Damals war es Friedrich, 1961)
- I Was There (German original title: Wir waren dabei, 1962)
- The Time of the Young Soldiers (German original title: Die Zeit der jungen Soldaten, 1967)

Richter was awarded the golden paperback (Goldenes Taschenbuch) in 1989.

Richter became Professor of scientific methodology and sociology at the Darmstadt University of Applied Sciences in 1973. He also published several books on sociology and psychology.

Hans Peter Richter was married to Elfried Feldman and had four children; Ulrike, Claudia, Leonore, and Gereon. He died in Mainz on 19 November 1993.
