= Sheila LaFarge =

French-American children's book translator (born 1936)

Sheila LaFarge (born July 16, 1936) is a French-American children's book translator, whose work focuses on translating Danish, Swedish, and Norwegian books into English.

== Career ==
Born on July 16, 1936 to Thomas Sergeant August Matilde La Farge and Marie Iselin La Farge in Paris, France, LaFarge spent her childhood in New York alongside her cousin's family and spending time with her grandmother during the summer. She frequently traveled to the United Kingdom and various European countries. As an adult, she began translating Scandinavian books to English and worked on several film projects in the area, including those by Mai Zetterling.

Out of the 150 best reviewed books chosen by School Library Journal, out of 600 total books reviewed as the top published and out of 24,000 books published total in the time period of 1966 to 1978, LaFarge's translation of Silas and the Black Mare was included. It was also selected as one of the "Notable Children's Books of 1978" by the Association for Library Service to Children.

After her retirement from book translation, LaFarge went on to pursue personal projects, including developing her skill in painting and her work at the Cambridge Buddhist Association.

== Bibliography ==
=== Authored books ===
- — (1969). Golden Butter. Dial Press. p. 39.

=== Translated books ===
- Carpelan, Bo (1971). Bågen [Bow Island] (in Swedish). Translated by LaFarge, Sheila. Random House. ISBN 9780440008439.
- Gripe, Maria (1973). Glasblåsarns barn [The Glassblower's Children] (in Swedish). Translated by LaFarge, Sheila. Delacorte Press.
- Gripe, Maria (1974). Landet utanför [The Land Beyond] (in Swedish). Translated by LaFarge, Sheila. Delacorte Press.
- Beskow, Elsa (1975). Puttes äfventyr i blåbärsskogen: ritade och berättade [Peter's Adventures In Blueberry Land] (in Swedish). Translated by LaFarge, Sheila. Delacorte Press. ISBN 9780440044352.
- Carpelan, Bo (1976). Paradiset [Dolphins In The City] (in Swedish). Translated by LaFarge, Sheila. Delacorte Press. ISBN 9780440050735.
- Gripe, Maria (1976). Elvis Karlsson [Elvis and His Secret] (in Swedish). Translated by LaFarge, Sheila. Delacorte Press.
- Gripe, Maria (1976). Elvis! Elvis! [Elvis and His Friends] (in Swedish). Translated by LaFarge, Sheila. Delacorte Press.
- Gripe, Maria (1977). I klockornas tid [In the Time of the Bells] (in Swedish). Translated by LaFarge, Sheila. Delacorte Press.
- Gripe, Maria (1977). ...ellen, dellen... [The Green Coat] (in Swedish). Translated by LaFarge, Sheila. Delacorte Press.
- Bødker, Cecil (1978). Silas og den sorte hoppe [Silas and the Black Mare] (in Danish). Translated by LaFarge, Sheila. Delacorte Press. ISBN 9780440079224.
- Bødker, Cecil (1979). Silas og Ben-Godik [Silas and Ben-Godik] (in Danish). Translated by LaFarge, Sheila. Delacorte Press. ISBN 9780440079224.
- Bødker, Cecil (1979). Silas fanger et firspand [Silas and the Runaway Coach] (in Danish). Translated by LaFarge, Sheila. Delacorte Press.
- Haugen, Tormod (1982). Nattfuglene [The Night Birds] (in Norwegian). Translated by LaFarge, Sheila. Delacorte Press. ISBN 9780440064527.
