= Friedrich (novel) =

Novel by Hans Peter Richter

Friedrich (initially published in German as Damals war es Friedrich) is a novel about two boys and their families as they grow together during Hitler's rise to power and reign in Germany in the 1930s. It is by the author Hans Peter Richter. Friedrich was first printed in 1961.

== Plot ==
Friedrich Schneider is a young Jewish boy growing up in an apartment house in Germany, with the narrator as his neighbour and friend. The story starts in 1925 and finishes in 1942 when the narrator is 17. Though the story is told by his non-Jewish friend (Hans Peter Richter or the narrator), Friedrich is the protagonist. The narrator's name is unknown, and speculations are that the narrator is Hans Peter Richter. The narrator tells of the persecution of the Jews through Friedrich's eyes. Friedrich is forced to switch to a Jewish school and is thrown out of swimming pools and movie theaters. An angry mob goes to his house and injured his mother, causing her to die of an infection(see Pogrom). His father gets fired and has an emotional breakdown after getting drunk. Friedrich finds a girlfriend, Helga, whom he likes, but soon he must stop seeing her, or she will be sent to a concentration camp. Friedrich and his father are forced to do whatever they can to make money to survive. Friedrich helps his father hide a rabbi in their house, but soon Friedrich's father and the rabbi are arrested, and Herr Schneider was probably sent to a concentration camp. Friedrich, who was not home when the police came, now must live in hiding.

During an air raid, Friedrich begs to be allowed into the air raid shelter but is kicked out by the air-raid warden, Herr Resch, who was also their landlord. After the raid, the narrator, his family, Herr Resch, and his wife return to the house. They notice Friedrich on the stoop, apparently unconscious. Herr Resch decides to get rid of him by kicking him, and they realise that Friedrich is dead, either killed by shrapnel (not specified) or killed by Herr Resch as evidenced as the trickle of blood he got after Herr Resch kicks him several times. Resch then remarks that Friedrich has died a better death than was expected.

Setting the Scene (1925)

The novel begins with the introduction of a garden gnome named Polycarp. The narrator talks about how he and Friedrich never met: their parents lived in a different apartment building, which was owned by a man named Herr Johann Resch. At first, the Schneiders and the narrator's family were more and dangerous where he can not have in his life because he is dealing with so much already acquaintances, but with the births of the narrator and Friedrich a week apart, they become better friends. The Schneiders' religion is not revealed in this chapter, though it is assumed they are Jewish because of how well-off they are. The narrator's father is unemployed, and the birth of the narrator puts a financial strain on his family. However, the narrator is still well received and feels welcomed in his home.

Potato Pancakes (1929)

One day when Friedrich and the narrator are four years old, Friedrich stays with the narrator's family while his mother attends to some business at City Hall. At first, the narrator is reluctant to share his toys with Friedrich and blocks the way to his room, but Friedrich doesn't seem to mind. He takes out a cuckoo whistle and begins blowing into it, and the narrator is fascinated by it. Friedrich gives him the whistle, and the narrator allows Friedrich to play with his toys. They later help the narrator's mother to make potato pancakes, and eventually, both children fight for the first pancake. When Friedrich drops the pancake, they decided to share and eat it from the ground. Because of the mess, the mother allows them to take a bath together, an activity both enjoy very much. This becomes the foundation of their friendship. Also, the narrator's mother remarks that Friedrich looks "like a little Jew" (in a non-hostile way), probably due to the fact he is circumcised.

Snow (1929)

It is snowing and Friedrich is playing with his mother in the snow, and the narrator wants to go over and play with them. When the narrator sees the duo having so much fun, he is anxious to go and play with them. However, the narrator has to wait until his busy mother is done before he could play. In the end the narrator's mother relents after finishing her work and brings the narrator out to play in the snow with Friedrich, just in time to watch them build a snowman. The narrator's mother thinks that the snowman is missing something after they are done building it, and Friedrich and his mother also seem to have the same thoughts. Thus, they use pieces of trash to form the parts of the snowman, such as potato peels and coal dust, but their landlord, Herr Resch, screams at Friedrich not to mess up his rose bushes when Friedrich when he plays and fools around and calls Friedrich a “Jewish Boy” as an insult. The narrator's mother pulls the narrator away from the window.

Grandfather (1930)

The narrator's grandfather comes to visit and learns of the narrator's interactions with Friedrich. The narrator's grandfather forbids the narrator from playing with Friedrich anymore, although nobody listens.

Friday Evening (1930)

The narrator sits in on the majority of a traditional Friday night Jewish tradition (the Sabbath) after playing with Friedrich all day with his toys. He gets to see how the Jewish people worship and what they do at the Sabbath dinner. The narrator leaves politely shortly after his mother comes home.

School Begins (1931)

On the first day of school, shortly after school lets out, the narrator and Friedrich's families both have a day out at the amusement park. However, since the narrator's and his family are poor, they are helpless to Schneider's generosity, which makes them feel even poorer. When the narrator's father finally jumps at the chance to buy them all photos and licorice, the family has to go without lunch as his father had used all the lunch money at the amusement park.

The Way to School (1933)

Friedrich and Hans see that Friedrich's doctor, Doctor Askenase, has the word "Jew" scrawled over his sign. They go to tell the doctor, but he claims he already knows. Later, they see a crowd of people outside a shop, so they push through and see a man with a swastika on his arm and a sign stating "Don't buy from Jews" blocking the door. However, an old lady pushes past the man saying she wants to buy from the shop and everyone stares at her. The old lady later emerged from the shop and proudly strode away.

The Jungvolk (1933)

The Narrator and Friedrich attend a Hitler Youth camp. The leader explains why the Jews are Germany's enemy, while letting the youths chant "The Jews are our affliction" While every other youth can repeat this mantra with no problem, Friedrich finds it hard to repeat as he himself is a Jew and did not know the racism against the Jews then. This is the first time Friedrich discovers Hitler's hatred for Jews. He is devastated. He runs out, and Hans is left watching.

The Ball (1933)

The narrator and Friedrich were playing with a ball when Hans accidentally threw it into a shopkeeper's window, breaking it. A crowd gathers around. The woman accuses Friedrich of breaking her shop window and trying to steal and insulted him for being a Jew. Hans immediately confessed to breaking her window and denied that Friedrich was trying to steal. The woman disbelieved him. Someone had called the police, and the woman explained the attempted 'burglary' of her shop, while Hans defended Friedrich. Then, Herr Schneider came and the woman explained the situation to him, leaving out her insinuation about Jews. Herr Schneider agreed to pay her for the damage, if the police let Friedrich free.

Conversation On The Stairs (1933)

Herr Resch confronts Herr Schneider on the house's stairwell and asks them to leave, calling the Narrator's Father to bear witness. Hans' father denied. Herr Schneider reminds Herr Resch of the tenant's agreement, but Herr Resch doesn't care. Herr Schneider begs for time to find another apartment.

Herr Schneider (1933)

The narrator and Friedrich sat at the curb outside their house. Friedrich explains some math problems. The street was empty. Far off, a man was walking. He slowly became closer. The approaching man was a drunk Herr Schneider. Friedrich pulls him across the sidewalk. Herr Schneider doesn't say hello back to him. He kept his eyes lowered and tears were running down his face. Herr Schneider and Friedrich disappeared inside the house while the narrator stood outside. The narrator's mother asks Frau Schneider about what happens to Herr Schneider. Frau Schneider drops down and cries loudly and violently. It takes a while for Frau Schneider to calm down. Frau Schneider then proceeds to say that Herr Schneider had lost his job because of his religion. Herr Schneider was forced out of his job at the age of 32.

The Hearing (1933)

Herr Resch sues Herr Schneider and tries to kick him out of the apartment/evict him just because he is causing a "disturbance" .In the court, the attorney of Herr Resch reveals that Herr Schneider is a Jew. However, Herr Schneider also reveals that he lived in Herr Resch's house for ten years and Herr Resch did not find anything wrong with that until a short time ago. The judge argues with Herr Resch that he wanted Herr Schneider out of the apartment only because he is a Jew and says that if he was to support Herr Resch's claim, Herr Resch might sue another person for being a vegetarian or being Catholic. In the end, Herr Schneider is allowed to continue staying in the house. At this point, Friedrich suddenly cries out. The judge calls Friedrich up and assured him that he will see that justice is done.
