= Laura Watkinson =

British translator

Laura Watkinson is a British literary translator. She studied languages at St Anne's College, Oxford, and has obtained some postgraduate qualifications since. She has taught at the University of Erlangen-Nuremberg and University of Milan.

Watkinson translates from Dutch, Italian and German languages into English, ranging from children's picture books and graphic novels to science and history. Since 2003 she has lived in the Netherlands, as of 2012 in Amsterdam. She founded the Dutch chapter of the Society of Children's Book Writers and Illustrators.

Watkinson's publishers won the American Library Association Mildred L. Batchelder Award three times in four years from 2012 to 2015. Thus the Association for Library Service to Children annually recognizes the most outstanding children's book newly published in the U.S. in English translation. All three were picture books translated from Dutch. Another of her translations from Dutch was a runner-up for the 2014 award. In 2015 she won the British biennial Vondel Translation Prize for her translation of Tonke Dragt's De brief voor de koning.

== Projects ==
- Cees Nooteboom - Roads to Berlin (MacLehose Press)
- Jan van Mersbergen - Tomorrow Pamplona (Peirene Press)
- Karlijn Stoffels - Heartsinger (Arthur A. Levine Books)

Batchelder Award citations All four books were published in the U.S. during the year preceding the award. All were originally published in Dutch.

- 2012 winner – Eerdmans Books for Young Readers, an imprint of Wm. B. Eerdmans Publishing Co., Soldier Bear, written by Bibi Dumon Tak, illustrated by Philip Hopman
- 2014 winner – Enchanted Lion Books, Mister Orange, written by Truus Matti
- 2014 honor – Eerdmans Books for Young Readers, The War Within These Walls, written by Aline Sax, illustrated by Caryl Strzelecki
- 2015 winner – Eerdmans Books for Young Readers, Mikis and the Donkey, written by Bibi Dumon Tak, illustrated by Philip Hopman
- 2024 honor – Eerdmans Books for Young Readers, Later, When I'm Big, written by Bette Westera, illustrated by Mattias De Leeuw.
