= The Last Dragon (novel) =

Children's fantasy novel by Silvana De Mari

- First American edition
- Author: Silvana De Mari
- Original title: L'ultimo elfo
- Translator: Shaun Whiteside
- Language: Italian
- Genre: Fantasy
- Publisher: Salani
- Publication date: 2004
- Publication place: Italy
- English publication date: 2006
- Media type: Print
- Pages: 368 pp (US edition)
- ISBN: 1-4231-0405-6

The Last Dragon is a children's fantasy novel by Silvana De Mari, first published in Italy in 2004 under the title L'ultimo elfo. Set in a post-apocalyptic world, it follows the journey of the last elf as he seeks out the last dragon so that the world can be renewed. Translated into English by Shaun Whiteside, it was published in the US by Miramax Books in 2006. It has also been published in the UK as The Last Elf. It is the author's third children's book and the first to be translated into English. It has also been translated into French, German, Spanish, Portuguese, and several other languages.

== Plot summary ==
In a two-part tale, the reader embarks on a journey of humor, sorrow, and tenderness, within a story of cultures colliding, highlighting a young orphaned elf, the last on earth, named Yorsh, full name Yorshkrunsquarklejolnerstrink. His village has been destroyed by torrential rain, and he finds himself living in a world plagued by intolerance, shrouded in darkness, hungry, cold, and wet. Upon meeting and being reluctantly befriended by a hunter named Monser and Sajra, a woman, Yorsh learns of a prophecy and of his importance in saving the world of this Dark Age. To fulfill the prophecy and bring the world into an age where the sun will shine again, he must first find another bereaved creature: the last dragon. Upon discovering the dragon, Yorsh decides to stay and keep him company.

The second part of the story takes place thirteen years later; the dragon dies leaving him with an egg. Yorsh takes upon the task of raising the young dragon. Yorsh, coming to miss deeply his companions, Monser and Sajra, journeys back to the old village to find their daughter Robi, and learns of the hanging they endured for protecting him. Saddened, Yorsh decides he will protect the young orphaned Robi. Deciding to leave, the elf, young dragon, and Robi move to a new country, forming a new constitution to govern the population of their new world, “No one can hit anybody… And you can’t hang people, either.”

== Sequels ==
The story of Yorsh continues in L'ultimo orco (The Last Ogre), published in Italy in 2005. Further books in the saga are Gli ultimi incantesimi (The Last Spells) (2008) and L'ultima profezia (The Last Prophecy) (2010). The sequels have not as yet been published in English language editions.

== Selected editions ==
Italian

- L'ultimo elfo, Adriano Salani Editore, 2004

French

- Le Dernier Elfe tr. Jacques Barbéri, Éditions Albin Michel, 2005

Spanish

- El último elfo, tr. Lina Patricia Bojanini, Belacqua, 2005

Latvian

- Pēdējais elfs, tr. Dace Meiere, Dienas Grāmata, 2006

English

- The Last Dragon, tr. Shaun Whiteside, Miramax Books, 2006 (US edition)
- The Last Elf, tr. Shaun Whiteside, Bloomsbury Publishing, 2007 (UK edition)
- The Last Dragon, audio edition, read by Patricia Connolly, Recorded Editions, 2007

Portuguese

- O Último Elfo, tr. José Neto, ASA Editores, 2007

German

- Der letzte Elf, tr. Barbara Kleiner, cbj, 2008

Lithuanian

- Paskutinis elfas, tr.Laura Vilkaitė, Nieko rimto, 2014

== Distributors ==
- HarperCollins Publishers (United States)
- HarperCollins Canada, Limited (Canada)
- Hyperion Press (United States)
- Turnaround Publisher Services Limited (United Kingdom)
- HarperCollins Publishers Australia (Australia)

== Awards ==
- Premio Andersen, 2004
- Premio Bancarellino, 2005
- Kirkus Star
- Mildred L. Batchelder Award 2007 (Nominated)
- Maine Student Book Award 2007 (Nominated)
- Nutmeg Children's Book Award 2011 (Nominated)
