= Raphael Rudnik =

American poet and literary scout

Raphael Rudnik (April 30, 1933 – June 22, 2009) was an American poet and literary scout. His poems have appeared in The New Yorker, The Quarterly Review of Literature, New Directions, and other journals. Rudnik received much acclaim throughout his career, receiving a Guggenheim Fellowship for poetry, the first Delmore Schwartz Memorial Award, and the Mildred L. Batchelder Award for translation. John Cheever called Rudnik "one of the most brilliant poets of his generation."

== Biography ==
Raphael Rudnik was born April 30, 1933, in New York City. His parents were Charles Rudnik, also a poet, and Amalia Rossfield Rudnik. Rudnik received his B.A. from Bard College in 1955 and M.A. from Columbia University in 1968.

Rudnik published the poetry collections A Lesson From the Cyclops (Vintage, 1969), In The Heart of Our City (Random House, 1972), and Frank, 207 (Ohio University Press, 1982). He also taught literature at Columbia University and elsewhere.

Rudnik began writing a book-length poem, On the Train, around 1982. He worked on the poem steadily for more than three decades. In spring 2009, knowing his health was failing fast after years of emphysema and other conditions, Rudnik redoubled his efforts to finish the manuscript, and completed the revisions a few days before his death. Paul Auster, who was a friend of Rudnik's, edited and compiled the drafts he left behind into a version of over 6,000 lines. An excerpt was published in Bomb Magazine in 2012.
