= Wojciech Oczko =

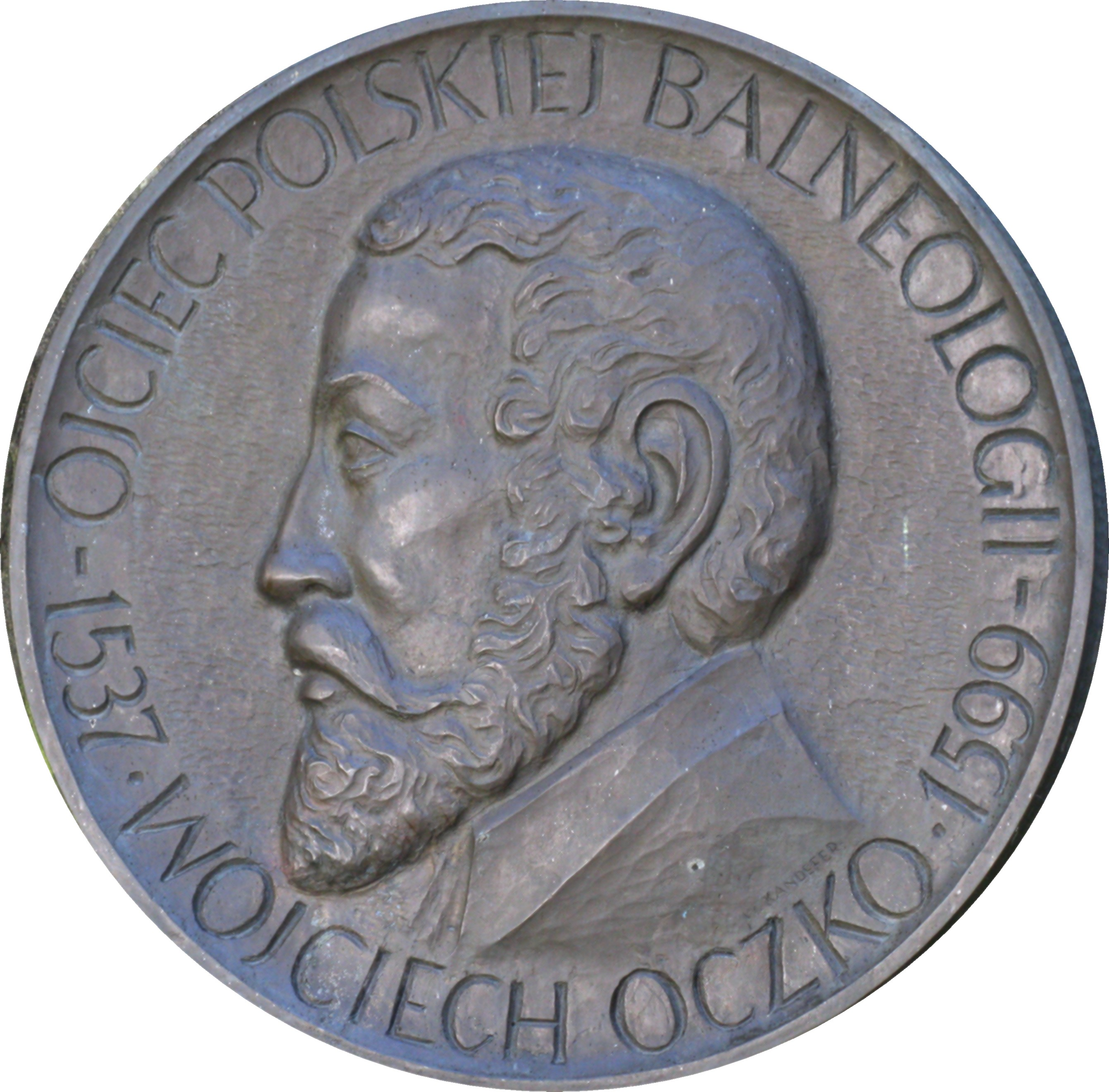
- Commemorative plaque in Iwonicz-Zdrój depicting Wojciech Oczko
- Born: 1537; Warsaw
- Died: 26 December 1599 (aged 61–62); Lublin
- Occupation: Physician

Wojciech Oczko (1537, Warsaw – 26 December 1599 Lublin), also known as Ocellus, was a Polish philosopher, doctor, Royal Secretary and court physician to kings Sigismund II Augustus, Stephen Báthory, and Sigismund III Vasa. One of the founders of Polish medicine, he was a medical writer who studied syphilis and hot springs.

== Life ==
Oczko's father was the Warsaw cartwright Stanisław Oczko. Wojciech began his education at the town and cathedral school schools in Warsaw. In 1559 he began entered the Jagiellonian University, earning his baccalaureus in 1562. He returned to Warsaw for a time and taught at the cathedral school there. In 1565 he left the Polish capitol to study at the Universities of Padua and Bologna, where he earned a doctorate in medicine. He travelled to Spain and France, where he spent time in Montpellier. In 1569 Oczko returned to Warsaw and began to practice medicine at St. Martin's Hospital. He then served for a time as personal physician to the Cracow bishop Franciszek Krasiński, and from 1576–1582 (with some breaks) as the court physician to Stephen Báthory. On the king's recommendation, Oczko studied the mineral springs at Szkło (now Shklo, Ukraine) and Jaworów (now Yavoriv, Ukraine). At the end of his career, Oczko served as personal physician to Sigismund III Vasa. In 1598 Oczko moved to Lublin, where he died a year later.

In 1574 Oczko married Elżbieta Obrąpalska (widow of Stanisław Obrąpalski), and after her death, married again, this time to Jadwiga Umięcka in 1596. Neither marriage produced any children.

== Works ==
Oczko wrote two major works in Polish about anatomy and surgery, as well as dietetics, in the process formalizing a number of terms in Polish medical terminology. The publication date of Cieplic (1578) is symbolically considered to be the foundation of the sanatorium at Iwonicz-Zdrój, whose mineral waters are described in the work.

- Cieplice Kraków: Oficyna Łazarzowa, 1578; repr., Warszawa: E. Klink, 1881 (with Przymiot); partially printed in W. Taszycki, Wybór tekstów staropolskich XVI-XVIII wieku, Lwów, 1928; 2nd ed., Warszawa 1955.
  - Foundational work of Polish balneology. Classifies mineral waters and springs in Poland, and describes how they might be used in curing patients.
- Przymiot. Kraków, 1581; repr. E. Klink, Warszawa, 1881.
  - Contains a summary of the then-current medical understanding of syphilis.

== Bibliography ==
- Bibliografia Literatury Polskiej – Nowy Korbut, vol. 3 Piśmiennictwo Staropolskie, pp. 28–29. Warsaw: Państwowy Instytut Wydawniczy, 1965.
- Kucharz, Eugene J., Marc A. Shampo, and Robert A. Kyle, "Wojciech Oczko—Famous Polish Physician." Mayo Clinic Proceedings 66, no. 8 (1991): 817.
