= Silvana De Mari =

Italian women writer

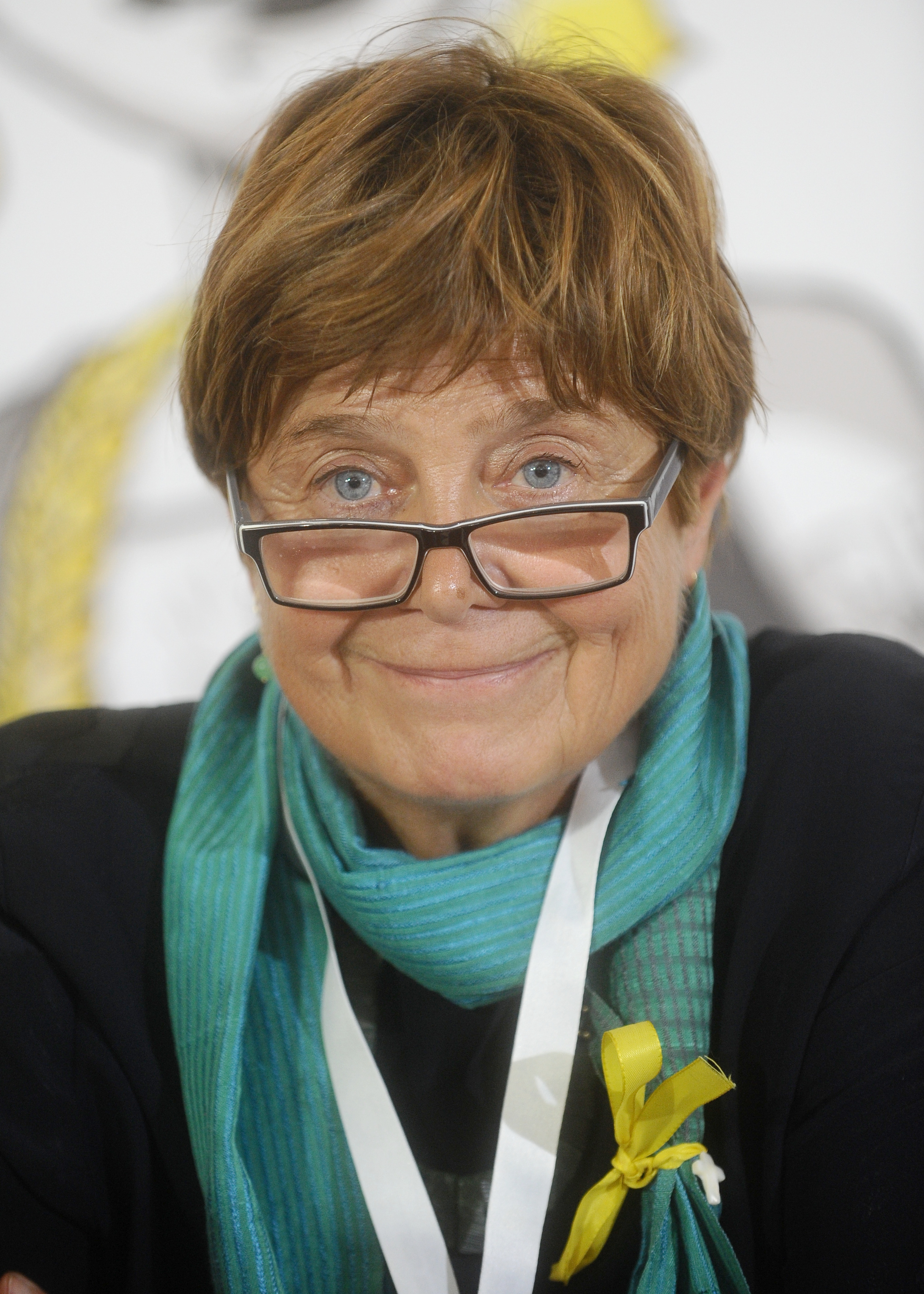
- Born: 5 July 1953 (age 73); Caserta, Italy
- Occupation: Writer

Silvana De Mari (born 5 July 1953) is an Italian writer of children's fiction and a struck off surgeon and psychotherapist. She is also known as the author of L'ultimo Elfo (2004), an award-winning fantasy novel published in English and 18 other languages (UK The Last Elf, US The Last Dragon). The book won the Italian prizes Premio Bancarellino and Premio Andersen. In France, it won the Prix Imaginales in 2005.

In Italy, she is better known for her homophobic, racist, anti-scientific, anti-vax and sexist positions.

== Biography ==
De Mari was born in 1953 in Santa Maria Capua Vetere (Caserta, Italy). She worked as a surgeon in both Italy and Ethiopia before setting up a private psychotherapy practice in Turin.

L'ultimo Elfo (The Last Elf, published in the US as The Last Dragon) was her third children's book and the first to be translated into English. It has also been translated into French, German, Spanish, Portuguese, and several other languages for a total of 23 countries (Brazil, Bulgaria, China, Finland, France, Germany Hungary, Japan, Latvia, Lithuania, Macedonia, Netherlands, Panama, Poland, Portugal, Romania, Russia, Spain, Thailand, Taiwan, Ukraine, United Kingdom, USA).

The following book [L'Ultimo Orco] (The Last Ogre) won the IBBY International Boud Books Young People 2006 prize and the Prix Sorcières "Les prix en littérature jeunesse" in 2009 in France. It has been published in France, Germany, Hungary, Japan, Lithuania, Macedonia, Panama, Poland, Romania, Thailand, United Kingdom and USA.

== Controversies ==
As of early 2017, after a claim made by some homosexual organisations, De Mari was brought before the Italian Medical Association for her statements regarding homosexuality (which she states "does not exist"), homosexual groups (who she called "criminals") and anal intercourse, which were defined by the President of the Order of Medical Doctors as not matching what medicine thinks today. She was convicted twice for aggravated defamation against the LGBT+ community.

She called the American Psychiatric Association "nonsensical", she made references to gay bowel syndrome, a controversial and outdated term, and denied that homosexuality exists, saying, "C'è una sola sessualità e persone biologicamente perdenti che la rifiutano" (There is only one sexuality and biologically lesser people who refute it).

With regard to the Diagnostic and Statistical Manual of Mental Disorders she also said:

The APA, American Psychiatric Association, rules the world using a statistical diagnostic manual without which you can not make an official diagnosis or expertise. The DSM (Diagnostic Statistical Manual) costs lots of money and has the same ethical and scientific value as had the various manifestos on race.

In 2013, De Mari wrote an open letter to Pope Francis, urging him to defend persecuted Christians rather than pursue popularity.

In 2021, the Turin Medical Association suspended her from carrying out professional activities involving interpersonal contact, together with 94 other doctors and dentists, for refusing to undergo the COVID-19 vaccination. In June 2023, she was struck off the Order of Physicians of Turin.

== Convictions for defamation of LGBT people ==
Silvana De Mari was convicted in two defamation cases before the Italian district court of Turin.

In the first case, charges were based on claims made by an LGBT Turin group along with the Human Rights Committee of Piedmont and the City of Turin, regarding statements of De Mari, where she claimed anal sex is a satanic practice, homosexual associations as crimes and called homosexuals a "new aryan race" and "idiots". Silvana De Mari was recognized guilty of defamation and sentenced to pay a fine of 1,500 euros.

The second case was motivated by a complaint of the Mario Mieli Homosexual Association, whose members were accused by Silvana De Mari of promoting pedophilia, necrophilia and coprophagia. This second case also ended with a conviction for defamation. De Mari was sentenced to pay a fine of 5,000 euros as a compensation to the injured association.

== Works ==
=== Novels ===
- L'ultima stella a destra della luna. illus. by Silvia Vignale. Salani. 2000.
- La bestia e la bella. illus. by Gianni De Conno. Salani. 2003.
- Il cavaliere, la strega, la morte e il diavolo. Lindau. 2009.
- Il gatto dagli occhi d'oro. Fanucci. 2009.
- Giuseppe figlio di Giacobbe, Effatà, 2014
- La nuova dinastia 2015, 2017.
- Il gatto dagli occhi d'oro, Giunti, 2015.
- Sulle ali della libertà 2016.

L'ultimo elfo saga:

- L'ultimo elfo. illus. by Gianni De Conno. Salani. 2004.
- L'ultimo orco. Salani. 2005.
- Gli ultimi incantesimi. Salani. 2008.
- L'ultima profezia del mondo degli uomini. Fanucci. 2010.
- Io mi chiamo Yorsh. Fanucci. 2011. (Prequel de L'ultimo elfo)
- L'ultima profezia del mondo degli uomini. L'epilogo. Fanucci. 2012.
- Arduin il Rinnegato. Ares. 2017.

Hania trilogy

- Hania. Il regno delle tigri bianche, Giunti 2015
- Hania. Il cavaliere di luce, Giunti 2015
- Hania. La strega muta, Giunti 2016

=== Essays ===
- Il drago come realtà – I significati storici e metaforici della letteratura fantastica. Salani. 2007.
- La realtà dell'orco. Lindau. 2012.
- L'ultimo nemico che sarà sconfitto è la morte. Joanne Kathleen Rowling e l'eptalogia di Harry Potter ne Il Fantastico nella Letteratura per ragazzi. Luci e ombre di 10 serie di successo, a cura di Marina Lenti, Runa Editrice, 2016.
- Le avventure di Bilbo Baggins, scassinatore, esperto cacciatore di tesori: l'oro e la menzogna nello Hobbit in Hobbitologia, a cura di Marina Lenti e Paolo Gulisano, Camelozampa, 2016.
