= Amerta Movement =

Javanese movement practice

Amerta movement is a form of non-stylised movement practice that draws on free movement, the practice of Vipassanā, Javanese Sumarah meditation and Javanese Theravada Buddhism. Its free-form approach is exploratory rather than therapeutic, though it is frequently used by therapists in many different disciplines as a way of enabling the client to learn more about their own life habits through movement.

== History ==
Amerta movement practice was first developed by Javanese movement artist Suprapto (Prapto) Suryodarmo (1945 - 29 December 2019) in the 1970s. In 1974 he created Wayang Buddha (The Buddha's Puppet). In 1986, he founded the Padepokan Lemah Putih where Amerta movement is now taught in Java.

== Principles and applications ==
Suryodarmo’s Amerta movement work draws on his perception of our relationship with the environment and the natural world, focusing on the body in movement in the environment. From its Buddhist roots, Amerta movement teaches ways to lessen our sense of identification in life and movement. It suggests that the ‘moving self’ is, in fact, a multiplicity of changing selves in a constantly changing environment - an idea that has been recently developed in the theory of eco-somatics.

Usually, according to Suryodarmo, we are in the condition that we are alone and we just see nature. Through moving we can reintegrate parts of our self and become a part of our environment.

Rather than being simply an approach to improvisation, Amerta movement is a practice that cultivates an attitude towards life. Suryodarmo and other trained Amerta movement practitioners use their own body movement as a means of sensing or diagnosing what is evolving in a person’s movement, life and relationships or in the interaction between people from different cultures.

Over time, students of Amerta movement can be seen to become adept at moving in ways that derive from their developing relationship to inner and outer experience. They also learn to move with a recognition of a number of essential ‘lenses’: ‘proportion’ in relation to themselves in their environment a sense of active and passive an understanding of point, line and angle in movement.

== Applications of Amerta movement ==
Amerta movement is studied and applied in Java and in Europe, Australasia and the Americas by dance and movement artists, musicians, psychotherapists, art/music/drama therapists, installation and other artists, filmmakers and teachers in particular.

Since the early 1990s, Amerta movement practice outside Java has been called Sharing Movement and has been witnessed on UNESCO’s World Environment Day as Web Art Garden - a worldwide network of artists and presenting organizations.

According to Katya Bloom, Amerta Movement involves “a skill which can be glossed over in therapy training – how to practice making one’s own bodily experience more conscious as a resource, to sense oneself as a three-dimensional container, able to receive and reflect the transference, projective identification and counter-transference more fully”.

== Teachers and resources ==
In Java and Bali, Amerta movement is taught by Suprapto Suryodarmo, who is based at Padepokan Lemah Putih.

Elsewhere, there are Pribardi Art teachers in Germany, the UK and several other countries.

As of 2025, his padepokan still active.
