= Society of Children's Book Writers and Illustrators =

Nonprofit organization

The Society of Children's Book Writers and Illustrators (SCBWI) is a nonprofit, 501(c)3 organization that acts as a network for the exchange of knowledge between writers, illustrators, editors, publishers, agents, librarians, educators, booksellers and others involved with literature for young people.

The SCBWI has more than 22,000 members worldwide, in over 80 regional chapters, making it the largest children's writing organization in the world.

== History ==
=== Organization History ===
The organization was founded in 1971 as the Society of Children's Book Writers by a group of Los Angeles-based writers, including the group's president Stephen Mooser and executive director Lin Oliver. Authors Judy Blume and Jane Yolen sat on the original board and continue to be involved today.

In 1991, illustrator and board member Tomie dePaola lobbied to officially include illustrators in the organization. and the name was changed to the current: Society of Children's Book Writers and Illustrators. Today, translators are also recognized as part of the children's-literature professions supported by SCBWI.

Further milestones: In 1993, Sue Alexander opened the first office in West Hills, California. In 1996, SCBWI launched its first website. In 1999, in Paris, France, SCBWI held its first conference outside the United States. Also in 1999, in New York City, SCBWI added an annual Winter International Conference. Today, the Winter Conference is held in-person annually in New York City. The former Summer Conference, which was held in-person in Los Angeles, is now a virtual conference only.

Capping off a tumultuous several years, in 2022, Lin Oliver retired as executive director and was succeeded by her daughter-in-law, Sarah Baker.

=== Controversy, diversity initiatives, and the Israel–Palestine conflict ===
Coming under scrutiny during the "Me Too" movement, SCBWI experienced some leadership turnover. On June 3, 2020, SCBWI Executive Director Lin Oliver announced that April Powers had joined the organization as its inaugural Chief Equity & Inclusion Officer. In June 2020, SCBWI appointed April Powers as its inaugural Chief Equity and Inclusion Officer, reflecting a broader expansion of diversity, equity, and inclusion (DEI) roles within U.S. cultural and nonprofit organizations. The role was created as part of the organization’s efforts to address representation and inclusion within the children’s publishing community.

In 2021, SCBWI became involved in further controversy after Powers issued a public statement condemning a rise in antisemitic violence during renewed conflict between Israel and Hamas. The statement affirmed that Jewish people have “the right to life, safety and freedom from scapegoating and fear.” That year, organizations tracking antisemitism reported significant increases in antisemitic incidents in the United States. At the time, SCBWI had also issued statements addressing anti-Black racism and anti-Asian violence.

Some members criticized the antisemitism statement for not also addressing Islamophobia or expressing solidarity with Palestinians. The dispute intensified on social media after Powers stated that SCBWI’s statements were issued in response to surges in hate crimes and would likewise address anti-Muslim violence if warranted. Critics also circulated a prior interview with SCBWI Israel in which Powers had described herself as “pro-Israel.”

Following sustained online criticism, SCBWI executive director Lin Oliver issued an apology to members of the Palestinian and Muslim community who felt “unrepresented, silenced, or marginalized." Amid a torrent of online abuse including death threats, Powers, who is Black and Jewish, resigned from her position.

During the controversy, Palestinian-American writer Razan Abdin-Adnani publicly challenged SCBWI and its representatives on social media. Archived posts attributed to Abdin-Adnani included references to an SCBWI Israel regional advisor and statements asserting that Jews should return to Germany or Poland rather than reside in Israel. The episode drew attention beyond the children’s publishing community and prompted discussion about institutional neutrality, antisemitism, and political expression in cultural organizations.

Several prominent authors associated with SCBWI, including Laurie Halse Anderson, Meg Medina, and Linda Sue Park later stepped down from their advisory board amid internal restructuring and ongoing member debate. In July 2021 an open letter to the organization's leadership from members of the children's book community criticized SCBWI's organizational structure, finances, and diversity efforts. This letter was published July 12 and garnered more than 900 signatures. Many individual members and the entire Rocky Mountain Chapter regional team resigned. On August 4, 2021, the board of advisors authorized an outside company to do an audit to find ways to reorganize and expand SCBWI.

In 2023, following the Hamas invasion of southern Israel and Hezbollah rocket attacks on northern Israel, many Jewish and Israeli SCBWI members called on the organization to condemn the invasion, as SCBWI had for Russia's invasion of Ukraine. To date, the organization has never unilaterally condemned those attacks. Member responses reflected differing views about whether and how a professional literary organization should address the conflict.

Debate over Israel-Palestine continued to affect SCBWI in subsequent years. In March 2024, more than 500 children’s and young adult authors and illustrators signed an open letter urging the organization to call for an Israeli ceasefire in Gaza and to establish a Palestinian regional chapter. The letter described the war as “genocide” and cited humanitarian concerns raised by international organizations. SCBWI responded with a public statement acknowledging the “ongoing war and humanitarian crisis impacting Palestinians and Israelis,” describing the death of children as “unbearable and unacceptable,” while stating that the petition contained “inaccuracies and insensitivities.” That statement also welcomed the creation of a Palestine chapter of the organization. Reactions among members were mixed, with some praising the response and others criticizing it as insufficient.

Amid that incident, in December 2024, SCBWI forcibly removed the volunteer regional advisor of its Israel region, despite a track record of vocally defending SCBWI within the Jewish community, around negative statements made privately about the failure of SCBWI and its executive director to express support for Israeli and Jewish members worldwide. SCBWI global leadership sent an email message to Israel region members at the time announcing falsely that the regional advisor had "officially retired." The Israel region continues to exist under new leadership.

The controversy surrounding SCBWI and its response to global events has been cited within broader debates in the publishing industry concerning Jewish representation, Israel-related themes, and the role of advocacy in literary organizations. Jewish and Israeli children's authors remain concerned about a growing cultural boycott of Israel in children's literature, as evidenced by the 2026 banning of an Israeli literary organization from participating in the Bologna Children's Book Fair, the world's largest and most important professional event dedicated to children's literature.

== Publications ==
The Bulletin: The SCBWI Bulletin is a bi-monthly publication containing information about the field of children's literature. Features include marketing reports; articles on writing, illustrating, and publishing; contests and awards announcements; SCBWI member news; and ongoing SCBWI activities throughout the world.

The Book: SCBWI also publishes The Book, which provides information and references to both published and unpublished writers and illustrators. Publications include specific information on publishers, agents, markets, educational programs, contracts, critique groups, and editorial services.

== Awards and grants ==
=== Award History ===
In October 1973, details were announced for the Golden Kite Award, the only children's literary award judged by a jury of peers. Today, the awards are given annually to recognize excellence in children's literature in four categories: Fiction, Nonfiction, Picture Book Text, and Picture Book Illustration. In March 1978, SCBWI announced it would offer work-in-progress grants in memory of illustrator and board member Don Freeman. Today, nearly $25,000 in Work-in-Progress grants are given annually to SCBWI members. In 2010, SCBWI established the Crystal Kite Member's Choice Awards to recognize great children's literature in 15 regional divisions around the world. In 2017 and 2018, SCBWI briefly offered an award jointly with PJ Library for excellence in Jewish children's literature. This award seems to have been discontinued without any announcement.

=== Current Awards ===
The Society of Children's Book Writers and Illustrators presents several awards and grants to its members each year including:

Amber Brown Grant: Named in honor of the late author and SCBWI supporter, Paula Danzinger, the Amber Brown Grants are given to underserved schools with the desire and commitment to enrich their curriculum with a visit from an author or illustrator. SCBWI provides an all-expense-paid, full-day visit by a well-respected children's author or illustrator. The chosen school also receives a $250 stipend to assist in creating the event and $250 worth of books by the visiting author. One or two schools are chosen each year.

Book Launch Award: The SCBWI Book Launch Award provides two annual awards of $2000 each for an author or illustrator to use for marketing a book scheduled for release during the next calendar year. The money can be used for any kind of promotional purpose that will increase sales and visibility of the book, such as launch events, speaking engagements, book tours, curriculum materials, advertising, book trailers, website development, or community events.

Crystal Kite Member Choice Awards: Recognize great books from the 70 SCBWI regions around the world. Along with the SCBWI Golden Kite Awards, the Crystal Kite Awards are chosen by other children's book writers and illustrators, making them the only peer-given awards in publishing for young readers. Each member of SCBWI is allowed to vote for their favorite book from a nominated author in their region that was published in the previous calendar year.

Golden Kite Award: Given annually to recognize excellence in children's literature in four categories: Fiction, Nonfiction, Picture Book Text, and Picture Book Illustration. Winning authors and illustrators receive an expenses-paid trip to Los Angeles to attend the award ceremony at the Golden Kite Luncheon at SCBWI's Summer Conference in August and a lifetime membership in SCBWI. A commemorative poster with the winners will be created and distributed to, among others, various schools, libraries and publishers.

Magazine Merit Award: The SCBWI Magazine Merit Awards are presented annually for original magazine work for young people. Each year, the SCBWI presents four plaques, one in each category of fiction, nonfiction, illustration, and poetry, each year to honor members' outstanding original magazine work published during that year. The works chosen are those that exhibit excellence in writing and illustration, and genuinely appeal to the interests and concerns of young people. Honor Certificates in each category are also awarded.

Member of the Year: Goes to a member who has given outstanding service to the organization.

Portfolio Award: An award for best portfolio on display in the Juried Art Portfolio Display at the Annual SCBWI Summer Conference in Los Angeles. The winner of the Portfolio Award receives an expenses-paid trip to New York to meet with interested art directors.

Sid Fleischman Award: An award for exemplary writing for children in the genre of humor. Sid Fleischman was the inaugural recipient of the SCBWI Humor Award, for his extensive body of work, at the 32nd Annual SCBWI Conference in Los Angeles, in August 2003.

Student Illustrator Scholarship: Each year four college students studying illustration are selected to attend the Summer and Winter conferences on a full scholarship.

Sue Alexander Most Promising New Work Award: Given to the manuscript deemed most promising for publication at the Los Angeles Summer Conference. Critiquers nominate manuscripts during the Los Angeles conference. The winner receives an expenses-paid trip to New York to meet with interested editors.

Tomie dePaola Award: Given annually to an illustrator of promise chosen by Tomie himself. The award consists of a $1,000 gift certificate for art supplies, plus full tuition, transportation and accommodations to the New York Winter Conference.

Tribute Fund: The SCBWI Tribute Fund commemorates members of the children's book community, their lives and their work by funding scholarships to the SCBWI International Summer and Winter Conferences for the general membership.

Work-in-Progress Grants: The SCBWI Work-In-Progress Grants are designed to assist children's book writers in the completion of a specific project, and are underwritten by a grant from Amazon.com.

A. Orr Fantasy Grant: Established in 2019, this grant supports new authors of middle grade and young adult speculative fiction. Founded in memory of Alice Orr Sprague, who published under the name A. Orr, the grant was created through the support of her sister, Michele Orr, to encourage new voices in fantasy and related genres such as science fiction, magical realism, and folklore. Recognized as one of the few grants dedicated specifically to speculative fiction for young readers, the award provides a cash prize and tuition to SCBWI’s virtual conference.

== Board of advisors ==
As of 2020 the board is made up of a host of prominent names in the field of children's literature including:

- Kathleen Ahrens, professor and author
- Laurie Halse Anderson, author
- Bonnie Bader, publisher
- Tracy Barrett, author
- Judy Blume, author
- Peter Brown, author and illustrator
- Priscilla Burris, illustrator
- Dana Carey, author and illustrator
- Christopher Cheng, author
- Lesa Cline-Ransome, author
- Bruce Coville, author
- Pat Cummings, author, illustrator and professor
- Matt de la Peña, author
- Emma D. Dryden, author
- Ellen Hopkins, poet and author
- Arthur A. Levine, author and publisher of Levine Querido
- Alvina Ling, publisher
- Laurent Linn, art director at Simon & Schuster Books for Young Readers
- Meg Medina, author
- Linda Sue Park, author
- Susan Patron, author and former public librarian
- Jerry Pinkney, illustrator
- Ruta Sepetys, author
- Melissa Stewart, science writer
- Patricia Wiles, author and SCBWI’s Director of Regional Team Management
- Lisa Yee, author
- Cecilia Yung, art director at Penguin Young Readers Group
- Cheryl Zach, author
- Paul O. Zelinsky, illustrator

== Activities ==
The SCBWI sponsors two annual International Conferences on Writing and Illustrating for Children each year, the Summer Conference held in Los Angeles, and the Winter Conference held in New York City. In addition, regional chapters around the world host dozens of smaller conferences throughout the year, ranging from events geared toward professional writers and/or illustrators to events for people just entering the field. Events such as book clubs, book launch parties, book signings, critique groups, gallery shows, KidLit nights, open studio tours, sketch crawls, writer/illustrator retreats, and more occur around the world. Each of the approximately 80 regions is led by a volunteer Regional Advisor (RA) or two co-RAs. Larger regions may also have Assistant RAs and Illustrator Coordinators as well as an advisory committee.

== See also ==
- List of children's classic books
- List of children's literature authors
- List of children's non-fiction writers
- List of fairy tales
- List of illustrators
- List of publishers of children's books
- List of translators of children's books
