= Street names of Warsaw =

Warsaw is the capital of Poland. This article gives an overview of street names in the city that refer to famous persons, cities or historic events.

== In the center of the city (postal code 00-0xx) ==
=== Persons ===
- Krzysztof Kamil Baczyński, 1921–1944, Polish-Jewish poet and Home Army soldier
- Gabriel Baudouin (Boduen) 1689–1768, French priest from Congregation of the Mission, charity activist
- Juliusz Bursche, 1862–1942, General Superintendent of the Polish Lutheran Church
- Canaletto, 1697–1768, Venetian painter who painted 26 views of Warsaw
- Nicolaus Copernicus, 1473–1543, Polish astronomer and proponent of heliocentrism
- Antonio Corazzi, 1792–1877, Italian architect of the Teatr Wielki, Warsaw
- Tadeusz Czacki, 1765–1813, Polish statesman
- Roman Dmowski, 1864–1939, Polish politician, chief ideologue and co-founder of the National Democratic Party
- Aleksander Fredro, 1793–1876, Polish poet and writer
- Tylman van Gameren, 1632–1706, a Dutch architect and engineer who worked for Queen Maria Kasimira of Poland
- Charles de Gaulle, 1890–1970, former president of France
- Wojciech Górski, 1849–1935, educator
- Kazimierz Karaś, 1711–1775, Polish castellan
- Stanisław Małachowski, 1736–1809, Polish aristocrat
- Emil Młynarski, 1870–1935, Polish conductor and composer
- Emilia Plater, 1806–1831, Noblewoman
- Molière, 1622–1673, French theatre writer, director and actor, one of the masters of comic satire
- Stanisław Moniuszko, 1819–1872, Polish conductor, composer, author of many songs, operas, and ballets filled with patriotic and Polish folk themes.
- Vaslav Nijinsky, 1890–1950, a Polish-born Russian ballet dancer and choreographer
- Józef Piłsudski, 1867–1935, Polish revolutionary, statesman and dictator
- Winnie-the-Pooh, cartoon character (Kubusia Puchatka)
- Witold Rowicki, 1914–1989, conductor
- Henryk Sienkiewicz, 1846–1916, Nobel Prize winning writer
- Michał Karaszewicz-Tokarzewski, 1893–1964, a Polish general
- Romuald Traugutt, 1826–1864, Polish general
- Julian Tuwim, 1894–1953, Polish poet of Jewish origin
- Stefan Wiechecki, 1896–1979, Polish writer who studied the Warsaw dialect

=== Groups of people ===
- the Ossolinski family
- Square of the Warsaw Uprisers (Powstańców Warszawy)
- Solidarity, the Polish trade union federation founded in September 1980 that helped bring down the communist regime (Solidarności)

=== Places ===
- Vauxhall, a district of London (Foksal)
- Jerusalem, capital of Israel (Aleje Jerozolimskie)
- Kraków, second largest city in Poland (Krakowskie Przedmieście)
- Mazowsze Voivodeship, largest and most populous of the sixteen Polish administrative regions or voivodships (Mazowiecka)

=== Miscellaneous ===
- Mortgage Street (Hipoteczna)
- Credit Street (Kredytowa)
- Royal Street (Królewska)
- Honey Street (Miodowa)
- New World Street (Nowy Świat)
- Holy Cross Street (Swiętokrzyska)
- School Street (Szkolna)
- Hospital Street (Szpitalna)
- Outlook Street (Widok)
- Gold Street (Złota)

== In the western part of the city centre (postal code 00-1xx) ==
=== Persons ===
- Władysław Anders, 1892–1970, General in the Polish Army and later a politician with the Polish government-in-exile in London.
- Mordechaj Anielewicz, 1919–1943, the commander of the Jewish Fighting Organization (Żydowska Organizacja Bojowa) during the Warsaw Ghetto Uprising
- Piotr Drzewiecki, 1865–1943, former president of Warsaw
- Konstanty Grzybowski, 1901–1970, lawyer and historian
- Jozef Lewartowski, 1895–1942, Communist party activist
- Stefan Mirowski, 1920–1996, Harcerstwo (scouting) activist
- John Paul II, 1920–2005, Roman Catholic pope born in Poland (Jana Pawla II)
- Emilia Plater, 1806–1831, Polish revolutionary that fought in the November Uprising
- L. L. Zamenhof, 1859–1917, initiator of Esperanto

=== Groups of people ===
- the Radosław Group of the Armia Krajowa (Zgrupowania AK Radosław)
- Carmelite street (Karmelicka)

=== Miscellaneous ===
- Parade Square (Plac Defilad)
- Iron Gate Square (Plac Żelaznej Bramy)
- Swamp street (Bagno)
- Wild street (Dzika)
- Boundary street (Graniczna)
- Problem street (Kłopot)
- Nice street (Miła)
- Nalewki street, named after the main municipal water source located there
- Low street (Niska)
- Orla, after the Polish name for an eagle
- Humble street (Pokorna)
- Transit street (Przechodnia)
- Bird street (Ptasia)
- Dragon street (Smocza)
- Cold street (Zimna)

== In the Old Town district (postal code 00-2xx) ==
=== Persons ===
- Bellony
- the mayor's street (Burmistrzowska)
- Wlodzimierz Dolanski, 1886–1973, doctor that treated the blind
- the dean's street (Dziekania)
- Elie Fondaminski, 1880–1942
- St. George's street (Świętojerska)
- Wiktor Gomulicki, 1848–1919, Polish writer
- St. John's street (Świętojanska)
- Jan Kiliński, 1760–1819, commander of the Kościuszko Uprising
- Roman Sanguszko, 1800–1881, Polish aristocrat, patriot and political activist
- Leon Schiller, 1887–1954, Polish theater director
- Zygmunt Słomiński, president of Warsaw

=== Miscellaneous ===
- Birch street (Brzozowa)
- Customs street (Celna)
- Tight street (Ciasna)
- Stone Stairs street (Kamienne Schodki)
- Canon street (Kanonia)
- Church street (Kościelna)
- Crooked Circle street (Krzywe Koło)
- Bridge street (Mostowa)
- Muranów, a district of Warsaw (Muranowska)
- Infantry street (Piesza)
- Beer street (Piwna)
- Street by the Market Square (Przyrynek), next to New Town Market Square
- New Town Market Square (Rynek Nowego Miasta)
- Old Town Market Square (Rynek Starego Miasta)
- Chivalry street (Rycerska)
- Wide and narrow Danube streets (Szeroki and Wąski Dunaj)

=== Groups of people ===
- Heroes of the Warsaw Ghetto (Bohaterów Ghetta)
- The Bonifrater Order (Bonifraterska)
- The Franciscan Order (Franciszkańska)
- The Jesuit Order (Jezuicka)
- The Capuchin Order (Kapucyńska)
- 1st Polish Armoured Division (1 Dywizji Pancernej)

=== Historic events ===
- Baroque (Barokowa)
- Kościuszko Uprising

== On the banks of the Vistula (postal code 00-3xx) ==
=== People ===
- Julian Bartoszewicz,1821–1870, Polish historian
- Konstanty Ildefons Gałczyński, 1905–1953, Polish poet
- Stefan Jaracz, 1883–1945, Polish actor and director
- Tadeusz Kościuszko (Wybrzeże Kościuszkowskie)
- Emilian Konopczyński, 1839–1911, Polish teacher, founder and director of the school
- Stanisław Markiewicz Viaduct,
- Saint Francis de Sales, 1562–1622, (Franciszka Salezego)
- Julian Smulikowski, 1880–1934, Polish social activist and leader of the Polish Teachers' Union

=== Groups of people ===
- Red Cross street (Czerwonego Krzyża)

=== Places ===
- Gdańsk (Wybrzeże Gdańskie)

=== Miscellaneous ===
- Side street (Boczna)
- Brewery street (Browarna)
- Quiet street (Cicha)
- Good street (Dobra)
- Wooden street (Drewniana)
- Electric street (Elektryczna)
- Dam street (Tamka)
- Hare street (Zajęcza)
