= Marsh Award for Children's Literature in Translation =

The Marsh Award for Children's Literature in Translation was a literary prize awarded in the United Kingdom from 1996 until 2017 to the translator of an outstanding work of fiction for young readers translated into English.

The award was given every two years and is sponsored by the Marsh Christian Trust. The award was administered from 1996 by the National Centre for Research in Children's Literature at Roehampton University, and subsidised in its early years by the Arts Council of England. From 2008 the award was administered by the English-Speaking Union.

== Winners ==
- 2017 – Helen Wang for Bronze and Sunflower, translated from the Chinese of Cao Wenxuan
- 2015 – Margaret Jull Costa for The Adventures of Shola, translated from Spanish; originally Basque language by Bernardo Atxaga
- 2013 – Howard Curtis for In the Sea There Are Crocodiles, from the Italian of Fabio Geda
- 2011 – Martin Cleaver for Letters to Anyone and Everyone, from the Dutch of Toon Tellegen
- 2009 – Sarah Ardizzone (née Adams) for Toby Alone, from the French of Timothée de Fombelle
- 2007 – Anthea Bell for The Flowing Queen, from the German of Kai Meyer
- 2005 – Sarah Adams for Eye of the Wolf, from the French of Daniel Pennac
- 2003 – Anthea Bell for Where Were You Robert?, from the German of Hans Magnus Enzensberger
- 2001 – Betsy Rosenberg for Duel, from the Hebrew of David Grossman
- 1999 – Patricia Crampton for The Final Journey, from the German of Gudrun Pausewang
- 1996 – Anthea Bell for A Dog's Life, translated from the German of Christine Nöstlinger

== Shortlists ==
2017

- Oh, Freedom!, by Francesco D'Adamo, translated by Siân Williams (translator) DARF Publishers – Italian
- The First Case, by Ulf Nilsson, translated by Julia Marshall (Gecko Press) – Swedish
- The Flying Classroom, by Erich Kastner, translated by Anthea Bell (Pushkin Children's Books) – German
- Bronze and Sunflower, by Cao Wenxuan, translated by Helen Wang (Walker Books) – Chinese
- The Secret of the Blue Glass, by Tomiko Inui, translated by Ginny Tapley Takemori (Pushkin Children's Books) – Japanese
- Little Black Fish, by Samed Behrangi, translated by Azita Rassi (Tiny Owl Publishing) – Persian

2015

- Waffle Hearts, by Maria Parr, translated by Guy Puzey (Walker Books, 2013) – Norwegian
- The Letter for the King, by Tonke Dragt, translated by Laura Watkinson (Pushkin Children’s Books, 2014) – Dutch
- My Brother Simple, by Marie-Aude Murail, translated Adriana Hunter (Bloomsbury Children’s Books, 2012) – French
- The Good Little Devil and Other Tales, by Pierre Gripari, translated by Sophie Lewis (Andersen Press, 2013) – French
- Anton and Piranha, by Milena Baisch, translated by Chantal Wright (Andersen Press, 2013) – German
- The Adventures of Shola, by Bernardo Atxaga, translated by Margaret Jull Costa (Pushkin Children’s Books, 2013) – Basque

2013

- In The Sea, by Fabio Geda, translated by Howard Curtis (David Fickling Books) – Italian
- The Little Prince, by Antoine de Saint–Exupéry, translated by Ros Schwartz and Chloe Schwartz (The Collector’s Library) – French
- My Own Special Way, by Mithaa Alkhayyat, translated by Fatima Sharafeddini (Orion Children’s Books) – Arabic
- Themba, by Lutz van Dijk, translated by Karin Chubb (Aurora Metro Books) – German
- The Midnight Palace, by Carlos Ruiz Zafron, translated by Lucia Graves (Orion Children’s Books) – Spanish

2011

- The Pasta Detectives, by Andreas Steinhöfel, translated by Chantal Wright (The Chicken House, 2010) – German
- Letters to Anyone and Everyone, by Toon Tellegen, translated by Martin Cleaver (Boxer Books Ltd, 2009) – Dutch
- No and Me by Delphine de Vigan, translated by George Miller (Bloomsbury Publishing, 2010) – French
- David's Story by Stig Dalager, translated by Frances Østerfelt & Cheryl Robson (Aurora Metro Publications, 2010) – Danish

2009

- My Brother Johnny, by Francesco D'Adamo, translated by Sian Williams (translator) (Aurora Metro Press, 2007) – Italian
- When the Snow Fell, by Henning Mankell, translated by Laurie Thompson (Andersen Press, 2007) – Swedish
- Letters from Alain, by Enrique Perez Diaz, translated by Simon Breden (Aurora Metro Press, 2008) – Spanish
- Tina's Web, by Alki Zei, translated by John Thornley (Aurora Metro Press, 2007) – Greek
- Toby Alone, by Timothée de Fombelle, translated by Sarah Ardizzone (Walker Books, 2008) – French
- Message in a Bottle by Valérie Zenatti, translated by Adriana Hunter (Bloomsbury Children's, 2008) – French

2007

- The Flowing Queen, by Kai Meyer, translated by Anthea Bell – German
- The Book of Everything, by Guus Kuijer, translated by John Nieuwenhuizen – Dutch
- A Bridge to the Stars, by Henning Mankell, translated by Laurie Thompson – Swedish
- Dragon Rider by Cornelia Funke, translated by Anthea Bell – German
- Just Like Tomorrow, by Faiza Guène, translated by Sarah Adams – French
- Mimus, by Lilli Thal, translated by John Brownjohn – German

2005

- The Thief Lord, by Cornelia Funke, translated by Oliver Latsch (The Chicken House, 2004) – German
- The Shamer's Signet, by Lene Kaaberbol, translated by the author (Hodder Children's Books, 2003) – Danish
- Playing with Fire, by Henning Mankell, translated by Anna Paterson (Allen & Unwin, 2002) – Swedish
- Eye of the Wolf, by Daniel Pennac, translated by Sarah Adams (Walker Books, 2002) – French
- Kamo's Escape by Daniel Pennac, translated by Sarah Adams (Walker Books, 2004) – French

2003

- The Shamer's Daughter, by Lene Kaaberbol, translated by the author (Hoodder) – Danish
- Brothers, by Ted van Lieshout, translated by Lance Salway (Collins) – Dutch
- Dog, by Daniel Pennac, translated by Sarah Adams (Walker Books) – French
- Where were you, Robert?, by Hans Magnus Enzensberger, translated by Anthea Bell (Puffin) – German
- Bambert’s Book of Missing Stories, by Reinhardt Jung, translated by Anthea Bell (Egmont) – German

== Multiple-award winners ==
Anthea Bell has won the Marsh Award three times (1996, 2003, 2007). Sarah Ardizzone (formerly Sarah Adams) has won the Marsh Award twice (2005, 2009).
