= Toby Alone =

Children's novel by Timothée de Fombelle

Toby Alone, originally published as La Vie suspendue, or A Life Suspended, is a children's novel by French author Timothée de Fombelle. Sarah Ardizzone's translation into English won the 2009 Marsh Award. The book was later followed by a sequel, entitled Toby and the Secrets of the Tree.

== Plot ==
=== Part One ===
A 13-year-old boy named Toby Lolness, who is just one and a half millimetres tall, lives in a civilization nestled in an oak tree. On his seventh birthday, his father, a scientist named Sim, creates a black box that causes one of his toys to move around by harnessing the power of crude sap. However, when Sim refuses to tell anybody how he did it, he and his family are banished to the Lower Branches, where Toby meets his best friend, Elisha Lee, for the first time.

When Toby is thirteen, his parents are arrested by the evil corporate tyrant Joe Mitch, who has a pathological obsession with hole-digging, and thrown into a prison, on a mistletoe ball called Tumble. He desperately wants to learn how to use the sap for his biggest project, the Big Crater, a massive hole in the middle of the tree, and Toby finds himself on the run from his own people. He struggles to survive alone. He is betrayed by his old friend Leo Blue. Another friend, Nils Amen, betrays him as well, but later pretends to be Toby, throwing the searchers off.

Toby passes through the Big Crater, where his father's enemy, W. C. Rolok, finds him. He attempts to make him swallow a sap ball, which the digger-weevils will rip his stomach open to reach. Toby spits the ball down Rolok's throat, takes his clothes, and gives him a whip to fight off the weevils. On the way out, he meets up with Mano Asseldor, who used to live on a farm in the Lower Branches, and the two escape together. Once they reach the Lower Branches, Mano is reunited with his parents and siblings, but he is forced to hide in a space behind the fireplace. Toby tries to get help from a miller and his wife, the Olmechs. They contact Joe Mitch's soldiers, but Toby manages to escape anyway. The Olmechs are thrown into prison for lying.

=== Part Two ===
Finally, Toby reaches the area where Elisha and her mother Isha live. He hides in a cave, and Elisha brings him food every day. When winter comes, Toby is snowed in for several months. He barely survives off Elisha's food and some mildew.

In the spring, he and Elisha create an elaborate plan to rescue Toby's parents from prison. The night of the planned escape, Toby is trapped in a wax cast, pretending to be the jailor Gus Alzan's injured daughter Bernice(or Bernie). Elisha was supposed to break in and rescue him and his parents, but she was unable to get into the prison, causing Toby to think she'd betrayed him. He escapes when a fire weakens the cast. He releases all the water in the cistern, extinguishing the fire. On the way to find his parents, another prisoner tells him they've already been executed, and that Elisha crushed his hand with her foot. Not believing him, Toby goes to his parents' cell, only to find the Olmechs, who were sitting in the cell labelled "Lolnesses". The Olmechs told Toby that his parents were already executed, and they were just the bait. Their son, Lex, is trying to rescue them at the same time.

Toby gives Lex the key to his parents' chains and walks to the end of a mistletoe branch, planning to jump off and end his life, as his parents were dead, and Elisha, the only tie with the world, betrayed him multiple times. However, he hears a bird squawking and decides to burrow into one of the berries and get eaten. He is carried away by the bird and loses consciousness. When he wakes up, he finds himself alive in the grass. He is taken in by the Grass People, specifically a young boy named Moon Boy and his older sister Ilaya, who rename him Little Tree.

Two years later, Pol Colleen, a neighbor from the Low Branches, visits the grass and tells Toby he was adopted when he was a few days old, that his adoptive parents are still alive, and that Elisha, whose mother was once a grass woman, is now being held prisoner by Leo Blue, Toby's old best friend, who has become a ruthless dictator and wants to marry her. Toby decides to go back to the Tree to save her. He succeeds thanks to a rescue plan which will cost the lives of many.

== See also ==
- Toby and the Secrets of the Tree
- Timothée de Fombelle
