= Kampala – Hamburg: Roman einer Flucht =

2020 novel by Lutz van Dijk

- 2020 book cover
- Author: Lutz van Dijk
- Language: German
- Subject: Persecution of homosexuals, LGBTQ migration, LGBTQ rights in Uganda
- Genre: Fiction (short novel)
- Set in: Kampala, Uganda and Hamburg, Germany (other minor settings in Lagos, Nigeria, and in Rwanda)
- Published: 2020
- Publisher: Quer-Verlag (GmbH)
- Publication place: Germany
- Pages: 176
- ISBN: 978-3896562838

Kampala – Hamburg: Roman einer Flucht (lit. 'Kampala – Hamburg: A Novel of Escape') is a 2020 short novel by German-Dutch author Lutz van Dijk published by Quer-Verlag.

The book chronicles the story of David, a gay Ugandan teenager living in Kampala, as he struggles to escape to Germany with the help of a young German man who wants to promote LGBTQ rights in Africa.

== Context ==
=== Author ===
Van Dijk is a German-born special education teacher who emigrated to the Netherlands and worked for the Anne Frank House in Amsterdam. He also spent part of his youth in New York City. Van Dijk took inspiration from German history and the persecution of homosexuals in Nazi Germany, writing several books related to Nazism and homosexuality.

His books have been translated into English, Xhosa, and Afrikaans, among other languages. After moving to Cape Town, Van Dijk founded an NGO for homeless children, also advocating for the organization to promote HIV/AIDS safety measures in South Africa.

=== Book ===
During an interview with Sabine Wagner of Bücher leben!, Van Dijk said that he wanted the book to highlight that the root of homophobia in Uganda is not Islamism but rather similar to Christian fanaticism in parts of the United States. Van Dijk also noted the attempts to impose the death penalty against gay men in Uganda under the auspices of President Yoweri Museveni. He further stated that the Ugandan LGBTQ community deserved complete support.

Van Dijk condemned the Ugandan government as dictatorial, drawing comparisons to other persecutions in history. As a resident of Cape Town and having deep knowledge in topics related to Africa, Van Dijk added that neither he nor his husband suffered from any attack; however, he also said that it is not easy to be gay or lesbian in South Africa. Van Dijk mentioned corrective rape as a form of homophobic violence against lesbians in South Africa. The book was published in 2020 by Quer-Verlag.

== Plot ==
The story chronicles the lives of two young gay teenagers named David. One of the Davids lives in Hamburg, Germany, and the other in Kampala, Uganda. The former is 18 years old, while the Ugandan teen is a 16-year-old secondary school student. The book begins with the description of the elder David, showing his enthusiasm in being a member of the LGBTQ+ rights movement in Germany and how he wants to promote LGBTQ rights in Africa. The Ugandan David struggles with his homosexuality; when he reads on Planet Romeo about David's activities in Germany, he decides to send him an email, leading to a close online friendship.

As the story tells more details about the life of Kampala's David, especially how his gay friends are being assaulted and murdered, David in Hamburg organizes a rescue mission along with other activist friends in Germany. The sequence leads to the African teen requesting help to migrate as a refugee, prompting efforts by a group of gay, non-binary, and transgender people mobilizing resources to bring David safely to Europe. One of the Ugandan boy's most staunch protectors is his own mother, who wholeheartedly accepts his sexual orientation. After Ugandan police launch a crackdown on gay men, David's mother takes out all the money from the bank and gives it to the teenager to help him pay for the trip to Germany.

Before leaving Kampala, David's mother and some of his friends are murdered by Ugandan police. Following a daunting escape amid the growing persecution after him, David manages to flee Uganda, subsequently embarking on a dangerous migrant path to Germany. He first stays in Nigeria and makes a brief passage through Rwanda before completing a risky crossing to Europe via Turkey. Upon reaching Germany, the two Davids meet, and the Ugandan youth begins a new life putting emphasis on honoring his mother and fighting for universal LGBTQ rights.

== Reception ==
The book received a positive review from Arbeitskreis für Jugendliteratur (AfJ), the entity responsible of awarding the Deutscher Jugendliteraturpreis. The website praised Van Dijk's "ability to combine fiction and reality," calling the dialogues "emotionally resonant and informative." In the review, AfJ added that both characters "share the anxiety and the longing for love without fear of punishment." The analysis concludes saying that the story holds background information as well as present-day information about LGBTQ rights in Uganda and other countries where sexual minorities are persecuted.

On its website, the German trade union Education and Science Workers' Union published a synopsis citing Van Dijk's book as a work coming amid the efforts of the Ugandan government to harshen laws, including the introduction of the death penalty against homosexuals. Sabina Wegner of Bücher leben! interviewed Van Dijk about the motives and focus on Uganda and Africa's relationship with sexual minorities. He said that his experiences while working with vulnerable people in South Africa may have spared him and his husband from direct assaults, adding that other members of the LGBTQ community, however, face much violence in the region.

Writing for Queeramnesty Berlin, Naana Lorbert and Stephan Cooper stated that the book is essential for schools, considering that while providing information about the persecution of sexual minorities in parts of the world, it also shows how the members of the LGBTQ community "bravely and resourcefully fight back." Frank Mugisha, the director of Sexual Minorities in Uganda (SMUG), expressed hopes that Van Dijk's book will be read someday in Uganda.

Rolf Brockschmidt of German newspaper Der Tagesspiegel gave another positive review of the novel, saying that Van Dijk drew inspiration from the life of Ugandan LGBTQ activist David Kato, murdered in his home in Mukono District in 2011. Other positive reception of the book came from the Märkische Allgemeine and the magazine Kultura Extra, the latter praising the combination of fiction with actual events.
