= Lutz van Dijk =

German-Dutch author and educator (1955–2026)

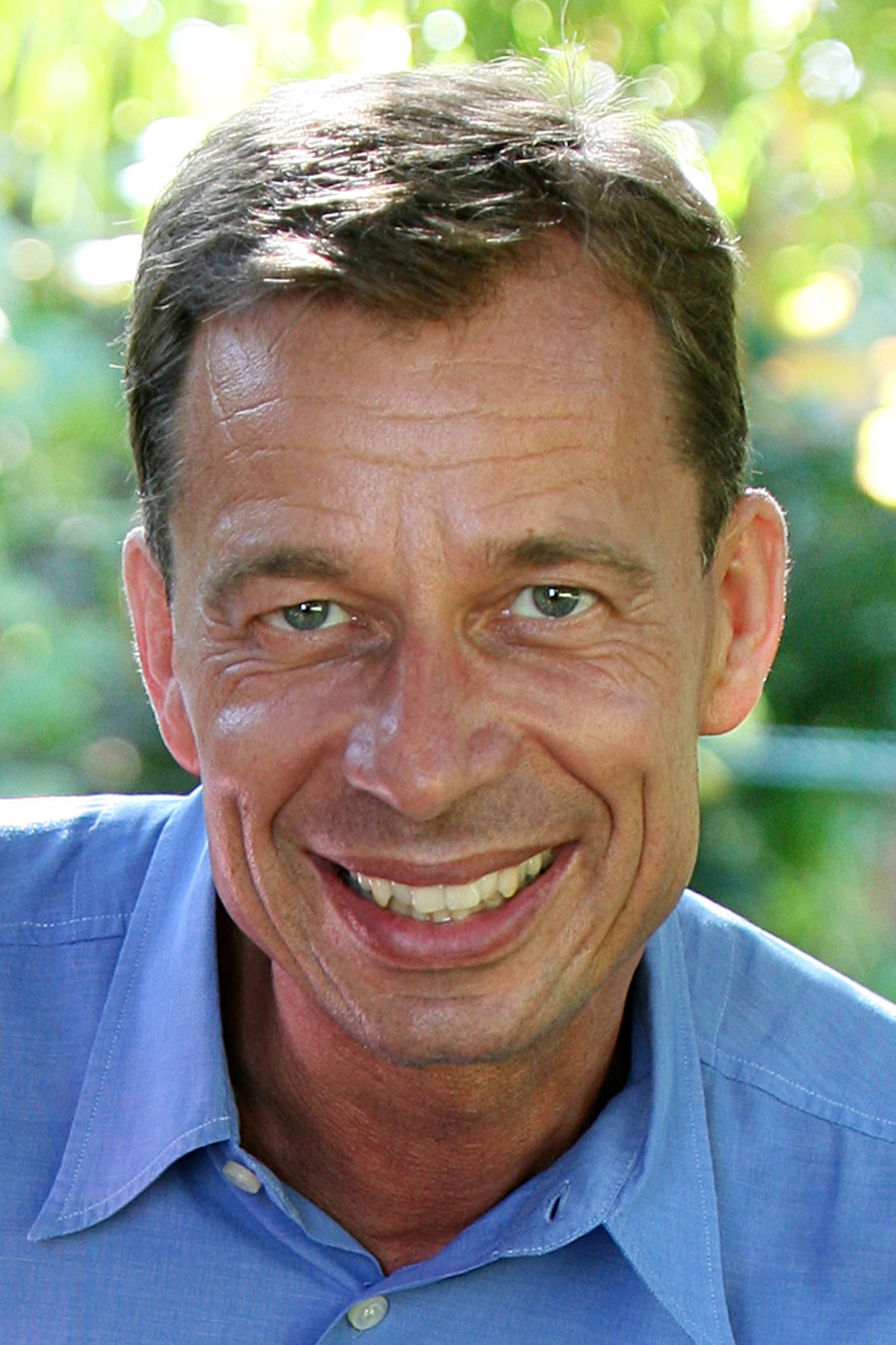
- Van Dijk in 2007
- Born: Lutz van Dijk; 7 August 1955; West Berlin, Germany
- Died: 17 November 2026 (aged 71); Amsterdam, Netherlands
- Citizenship: Germany; Netherlands
- Writing career
- Language: German

Lutz van Dijk (7 August 1955 – 17 November 2026) was a German and Dutch author, educator and human rights activist. Born in Berlin, Germany, he moved to New York City at the age of 18 before relocating to Hamburg, where he studied and worked as a special education teacher. He later worked at the Anne Frank House in Amsterdam and founded an aid organization for homeless children in Cape Town, South Africa. His writing explored subjects such as the persecution of homosexuals in Nazi Germany. He later turned to writing children's literature, writing books that addressed themes including LGBTQ migration.

== Life and career ==
Lutz van Dijk was born on 7 August 1955 in West Berlin, and grew up near the Berlin Wall, in the Lankwitz quarter. In 1973, at age 18, he moved to New York City and also spent time in Canada and Mexico. He returned to Germany and studied pedagogy in Hamburg. He worked there as a teacher in primary schools and in special education. He received his doctorate in 1987 at the University of Hamburg, with a thesis in the field of educational sciences about teachers who opposed Nazism in Germany.

Van Dijk joined the Anne Frank House in Amsterdam in 1992. He became a naturalized Dutch citizen.

In his writing, Van Dijk dealt with topics related to Nazism and homosexuality and, since 2018, he published children's books. Van Dijk also wrote Kampala-Hamburg, a book about a gay refugee from Uganda who escapes persecution in his native country and flees to Hamburg with the help of German LGBTQ+ activists. Van Dijk wrote most of his books, around 50 novels and documentaries in German, with many of them translated into Afrikaans, Xhosa, and English.

In 2001, Van Dijk and his husband Perry Tsang founded the aid organization HOKISA (Homes for Kids in South Africa) in a town near Cape Town. His partners in the NGO were mostly South African activists. HOKISA provides support for children and young people who have lost their parents to AIDS or who are themselves HIV-positive. The first HOKISA home opened near Cape Town in 2002.

In the summer of 2009, he was named an honorary professor in poetics at the Research Center for Children's and Young Adult Literature at the University of Oldenburg. In 2024 he wrote an autobiography, Irgendwann die weite Welt (At some time the vast world), recounting his childhood in a city divided by the Berlin Wall, and his decision to move to New York City as soon as he turned 18. In 2026 he published as a sequel "Die weite Welt. New York bis Kapstadt, narrating his life from his years in the United States to his those in South Africa.

Van Dijk suffered from Parkinson's disease. He died in Amsterdam on 17 November 2026, at the age of 71.

== Awards ==
In 1997, Van Dijk was awarded the Youth Literature Award of Namibia. In 2001, he received the Gustav Heinemann Peace Prize for Township Blues. His book Kampala – Hamburg was nominated in 2021 for the Deutscher Jugendliteraturpreis.

== Publications ==
- Alternativschulen. Information, Probleme, Erfahrungen. Rowohlt, Reinbek 1979, ISBN 978-3-499-17261-8.
- Lernen in der Friedensbewegung. Beltz, Weinheim/Basel 1984, ISBN 978-3-407-33302-5.
- Aufstand im Gelobten Land. Erkundungen zur Intifada. Junius, Hamburg 1989, ISBN 978-3-88506-171-7.
- Feinde fürs Leben? Aufregende Ferien in Jerusalem. Rowohlt, Reinbek 1989, mehrere Neuauflagen, ISBN 978-3-499-20555-2.
- Verdammt starke Liebe: Die wahre Geschichte von Stefan K. und Willi G. Rowohlt, Reinbek 1991 (new ed. Querverlag, Berlin 2015), ISBN 978-3-89656-229-6.
- "Ein erfülltes Leben – trotzdem …" Erinnerungen Homosexueller 1933–1945. Rowohlt, Reinbek 1992, ISBN 978-3-499-18278-5.
- mit Karin Chubb: Der Traum vom Regenbogen. Nach der Apartheid: Südafrikas Jugend zwischen Wut und Hoffnung. Rowohlt, Reinbek 1999, ISBN 978-3-499-22598-7.
- Lutz van Dijk erzählt die Geschichte der Juden. Campus, Frankfurt am Main 2001, ISBN 978-3-593-36703-3.
- Von Skinheads keine Spur. cbj, München 2009, ISBN 978-3-641-01056-0.
- Der Attentäter. Hintergründe der Pogromnacht 1938: die Geschichte von Herschel Grynszpan. cbj, München 2003, ISBN 978-3-570-30108-1.
- with Günter Grau: Einsam war ich nie: Schwule unter dem Hakenkreuz 1933–1945. Querverlag, Berlin 2003, ISBN 978-3-89656-097-1.
- Themba. cbj, München 2006, ISBN 978-3-570-40301-3.
- Leben bis zuletzt: Geschichten von Freundschaft, Liebe und Tod. cbj, München 2007, ISBN 978-3-570-30220-0.
- Die Geschichte von Liebe und Sex. Campus, Frankfurt am Main 2007, ISBN 978-3-593-37913-5.
- Auf Leben und Tod. Wie in der Welt gestorben wird. Gütersloher Verlagshaus, Gütersloh 2010, ISBN 978-3-579-06875-6.
- Romeo und Jabulile. Peter Hammer, Wuppertal 2010, ISBN 978-3-7795-0281-4.
- African Kids. Eine südafrikanische Township-Tour. Peter Hammer, Wuppertal 2012, ISBN 978-3-7795-0423-8.
- Afrika – Geschichte eines bunten Kontinents. Neu erzählt mit afrikanischen Stimmen. Peter Hammer, Wuppertal 2015, ISBN 978-3-7795-0527-3.
- "Endlich den Mut …" Briefe von Stefan T. Kosinski (1925–2003). Querverlag, Berlin 2015, ISBN 978-3-89656-228-9.
- Mbongis Weg zur Schule. Eine Geschichte aus Afrika. Fischer Duden Kinderbuch, Frankfurt am Main 2018, ISBN 978-3-7373-3349-8.
- Kampala – Hamburg: Roman einer Flucht. Querverlag, Berlin 2020, ISBN 978-3-89656-283-8.
- ed. with Joanna Ostrowska and Joanna Talewiez-Kwiatkowska: Erinnern in Auschwitz auch an sexuelle Minderheiten. Querverlag, Berlin 2020, ISBN 978-3-89656-289-0.
- Jüdische Leben. Berichte aus 4000 Jahren. Büchergilde Gutenberg, Frankfurt am Main 2021, ISBN 978-3-7632-7283-9.
- Irgendwann die weite Welt. Ein autobiografischer Roman. Querverlag, Berlin 2024, ISBN 978-3-89656-346-0.
- Die weite Welt. New York bis Kapstadt. Querverlag, Berlin 2026, ISBN 978-3-89656-720-8.
