= Faïza Guène =

French writer and director (born 1985)

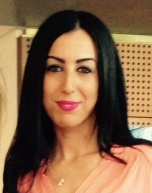
- Guène in 2015
- Born: 7 June 1985 (age 41); Bobigny, France
- Occupation: Novelist
- Writing career
- Period: 2004–present
- Notable works: Kiffe kiffe tomorrow (2004); Dreams from the Endz (2006)

Faïza Guène (born 7 June 1985) is a French writer and director, best known for her two novels, Kiffe kiffe demain and Du rêve pour les oufs. She has also directed several short films, including Rien que des mots (2004).

== Biography ==
Born in Bobigny, France, in 1985, to parents of Algerian origin, Guène grew up in Pantin, in the northeastern suburbs of Paris. She attended Collège Jean Jaurès, followed by Lycée Marcelin Berthelot in Pantin. She began studies in sociology at Université Paris VIII, in St-Denis, before abandoning them to pursue writing and directing full-time.

Her debut novel, Kiffe kiffe demain, was published in 2004 when Guène was 19 years old. It has sold more than 400,000 copies and been translated into 26 different languages. The novel was translated into English in 2006 by Sarah Ardizzone under the title Kiffe Kiffe Tomorrow (US) and Just Like Tomorrow (UK).

Guène's second work, Du rêve pour les oufs, was released in 2006 in France and translated into English by Ardizzone as Dreams from the Endz.

Guène wrote for Respect Magazine since 2005.

In 2022, she was elected a Royal Society of Literature International Writer.

== Publications ==
- Kiffe kiffe demain. Paris: Hachette Littérature, 2004.
- Du rêve pour les oufs. Paris: Hachette Littérature, 2006.
- Les gens du Balto. Paris: Hachette Littérature, 2008.
- Un homme, ça ne pleure pas. Paris: Fayard, 2014.
- Millénium blues. Paris: Fayard, 2018.
- La discrétion. Paris: Plon, 2020.
- Kiffe kiffe hier. Paris: Fayard, 2024.

== Sources ==
- Faïza Guène at Hachette Livre
- Faïza Guène at BookBrowse
- Faïza Guène at Evene
