= Transgender asylum seekers =

Transgender people seeking refugee status

Transgender asylum seekers are transgender people seeking refuge in other countries (or legally distinct regions such as states) due to stigmatization or persecution in their home country. Transgender people oftentimes flee due to dangerous living conditions and discrimination.

Because of their gender non-conformity, transgender asylum seekers face elevated risks to their mental and physical health. Transgender asylum seekers encounter greater challenges in comparison to cisgender asylum seekers those whose gender identity is the same as their sex assigned at birth. The challenges transgender asylum seekers face include higher risks of physical and sexual assault, torture, "conversion therapy" practices, and forced isolation. Research shows that transgender migrants and asylum seekers face intersecting forms of discrimination—related to their being both transgender and migrant people—that can generate health risks for members of the community because of how their "lives [...] are continuously upended by oppressive policies." As a result, transgender people face challenges in the asylum process not experienced by others.

As defined in the 1951 United Nations Convention Relating to the Status of Refugees, a refugee or asylum seeker is any "person owing to a well-founded fear of being persecuted for reasons of race, religion ... [or] membership [to] a particular social group [that cannot] avail himself of the protection of that country" which does not include discrimination on the basis of sex. As of 2025, there are only 37 countries across the globe that provide asylum to individuals out of concern that they may be persecuted for their sexual orientation and/or gender identity in their country of origin. Only a few of these countries consistently and methodically carry out studies that include sexual orientation and gender identity (SOGI) measures within their collections of demographic data. Because of this, the pool from which one can collect generalizable information about the lived experiences of LGBTQ+ asylum seekers, refugees, and migrants is extremely limited.

In the US, gender-based discrimination laws are based on the experiences of cisgender women, therefore, transgender migrants are forced to undergo rigid asylum processes that exclude their identities. Additionally, their experiences are not encompassed because the "refugee experience" has been seen through Eurocentric terms due to standardized term and definition of the refugee following World War 2 and it is also a broad category.

For example, asylum claims made by transgender refugees are considered under the basis of persecution because of their involvement in a particular social group in the U.S. This requirement means that membership to a social group is not enough in order to claim asylum, but that refugees must prove that they have been persecuted because of their social group's standing in order to be granted refuge. Transgender asylum seekers are required to provide "proof of gender transition" which reproduces harmful ideas of gender binaries.

The growing restrictive asylum policies and processes include increased periods of mandatory detention and extended processing times. Due to longer processing times, transgender migrants are forced to remain in detention centers while they wait and experience sexual assault due to facilities separated by gender binaries. As a result, transgender asylum seekers are required to navigate complex legal procedures and experience trauma throughout the process.

These processes result in high levels of mental and physical distress as refugees navigate the asylum process.

== Countries of origin ==
Transgender persons may have experienced "severe persecution" in the countries they have fled, even where anti-transgender laws do not exist. Regardless of anti-transgender laws, the strict gender norms that exist in many countries, associating masculinity exclusively with men and femininity exclusively with women, perpetuate the violence faced by transgender refugees. Because transgender people often move away from identifying with their sex assigned at birth, or feel as if their gender is fluid, many transgender refugees face persecution, discrimination, and transphobia in their home countries. The stigmatization and violence faced by this group of refugees can take place in a range of places, including within the home, the workplace, with health care providers, or simply from the general population.

Research shows that transgender individuals experience greater socioeconomic disadvantages, more exposure to traumatic events, and more stressors than cisgender individuals within their home countries. These individuals also often face multiple forms of stigmatization related to their employment, health care access, housing, and other areas of life. A document review of asylum applications of Mexican transgender refugees revealed several common themes, focusing on stressors experienced, health consequences of these stressors, and services accessed by transgender asylum seekers. In their place of origin, Mexico, each asylum seeker faced some levels of verbal, physical, and sexual assault, an unstable environment, fear for their safety and security, and economic insecurity.

Transgender asylum seekers seek refuge from many parts of the world.

=== Mexico ===
The report states that "[w]hile living in Mexico ... verbal assaults often started at a very early age and continued until they escalated to physical assault." Most asylum seekers within the study reported numerous physical assaults by peers, family members, and authority figures, and many reported sexual assaults that started in their early teens.

For example, one asylum seeker explained how "[In Mexico] [m]y father always rejected me throughout my childhood . . . He beat me a lot. He beat me with his hands, kicked me a lot, and often [used] whatever he could find around him to beat me. I lived in fear for my life around my father... because he wanted to have sons that acted like men not women." Focusing on the violence faced because of gender norms, this asylum seeker describes violence within her own household. While living in Mexico, many asylum seekers also reported being kicked out of their homes or fleeing because of violent family members, and many reported living on the streets or with anyone who would take them in. In addition, asylum seekers reported moving multiple times to escape harassment, discrimination, and abuse or to find a more LGBTQ-inclusive environment, creating a lot of environmental instability.

A 2020 public health review determined that transgender women seeking asylum from Mexico were fleeing a situation of "extreme vulnerability." Finally, each asylum seeker reported leaving Mexico because of extreme fear of violence and death since many of them had friends who, because of their identities, were beaten, raped, or even murdered. This report shows the high levels of mental and physical stressors of transgender asylum seekers within their home countries.

=== Central America ===
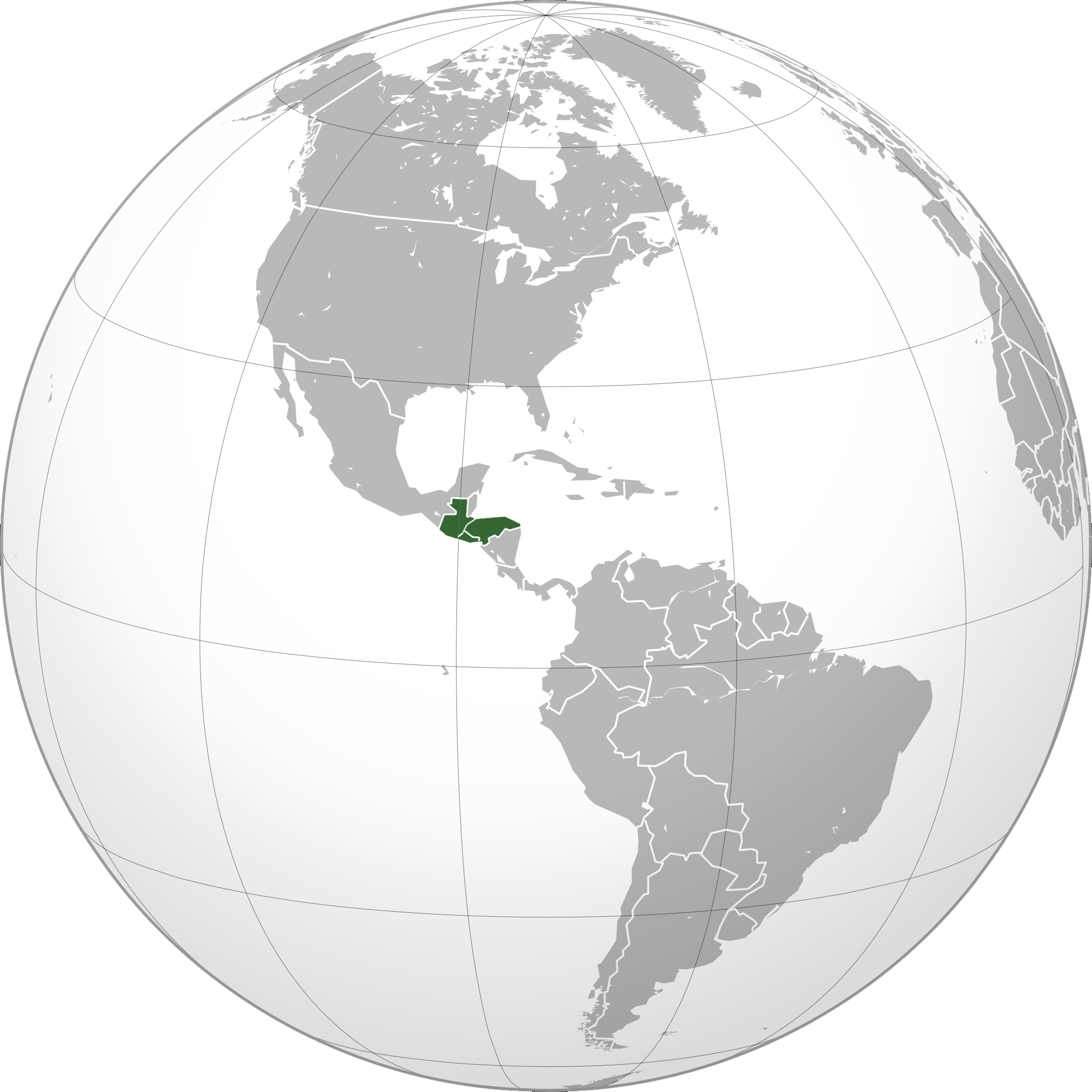
Geographic Location of Central America's Northern Triangle (Honduras, El Salvador, and Guatemala)

In 2017, Amnesty International released a report on LGBTI people seeking asylum in Mexico, describing El Salvador, Guatemala, and Honduras as being "no safe place" for transgender people. The countries of El Salvador, Guatemala, and Honduras form part of the Northern Triangle which is a region in Latin America that is experiences high rates of violence, unemployment, and low levels of economic opportunities due to prolonged instability fueled by US intervention. Alongside the conditions of violence and repression Central American societies produce, transgender individuals face discrimination in employment. Transgender asylum seekers encounter higher rates of hate crimes and homophobia in their countries of origin in Central America due to the machismo and misogyny within Central American societies. For example, maras in Central America have been found to perpetrate hate crimes against transgender migrants by cutting of their hair, which symbolizes transition, in order to strip them from their dignity. As such, Central American transgender migrants can only attain safety from these forces by becoming asylum seekers or migrating from their home countries.

Violence against transgender individuals are not seen as valid claims and perpetrators act with impunity because state forces and authorities do not enforce laws protecting transgender individuals. Most importantly, Central American migrants cross multiple borders from their home countries prior to arriving in Mexico. For instance, at the Mexico/Guatemala Border there is only one migrant shelter that serves LGBTQ migrants, known as La 72. Central American migrants undergo different levels of exploitation in comparison to asylum seekers from Mexico who experience different economic conditions. Transgender Central American migrants are vulnerable to sexual exploitation as well due to their conditions of being undocumented in Central American countries. In Mexico, transgender migrant women are targeted for human and sex trafficking in popular destinations for sex tourism, specifically Guadalajara and Puerto Vallarta in Jalisco. Asylum seekers and migrants, therefore, will be subject to kidnappings and extortion from organized crime. After the 1996 Immigration Reform and Control Act, immigration became criminalized in order to surveil asylum seekers and migrants, ultimately to control immigration coming into the U.S.

On their journey north, police and authorities will target transgender migrants. Maras have forced transgender migrants to travel with drugs, hide weapons, and traffick drugs. As such, authorities will surveil and criminalize transgender migrants as they make their journey across Mexico. Following attacks or abuses on the migrant trail, migrants can be denied access to health care and medical attention from healthcare providers and hospitals in Mexico and Central America due to homophobia.

Most transgender asylum seekers arriving in the United States flee from Central American countries. On their journey North, transgender asylum seekers also encounter maras (gangs) who extort, rape, hide weapons, and force them to sell drugs in transit due to the heteronormative gang structure present in many transnational organizations.

==== Honduras ====
Around 90 LGBTQ+ citizens were killed in Honduras between the years of 2009 to 2012. In the eyes of those sympathetic to the victims, only a portion of the perpetrators have been held accountable. Those asserting that more can be done on behalf of the Honduran government believe that state, federal, and local officials routinely fail to properly investigate and dissect crimes committed against LGBTQ+ citizens—particularly transgender individuals. Such a group argues that these kinds of hateful perpetrations are commonly left unreported on a national and local scale because of the rampant social stigma surrounding queerness in the country.

Recently, however, the Honduran government has taken action to address violence enacted upon the LGBTQ+ community after facing a great amount of social condemnation. Many accused the government of continuously failing to resolve cases of attacks committed against members of the LGBTQ+ community. As a result, the Honduran government created a unit within the Attorney General's Office that is aimed at examining cases containing targeted violence against transgender individuals within the country, and was first established in January 2011 in Tegucigalpa. Since then, a similar unit has been added to the government of San Pedro Sula.

== Transportation ==
=== Caravans ===
One form of transportation utilized by many in the transgender community across Latin America are caravans. Many use this medium to flee oppression, marginalization, and discrimination in their home countries.

During the so-called 'Central American Exodus of late 2018 and early 2019', a record-high numbers of Latin American migrants—with Central Americans in particular—assembled in caravans to travel towards the US-Mexico border, partaking in a form of transmigration that those who could not afford to travel with a coyote considered the safest option. These caravans provided asylum seekers with aid that has been donated by volunteering institutions to help them on their migratory journeys.

== Treatment while seeking asylum ==
In most cases, transgender asylum seekers are at greater risk than others while seeking asylum. The restrictive asylum policies and processes, increased periods of mandatory detention, and extended processing times, create unsafe, unstable environments for transgender persons. Although the claim for asylum due to discrimination faced because of gender identity can constitute viable grounds for asylum, "proving" one's identity can be particularly challenging for transgender asylum seekers. Adjudicators, those who approve asylum claims, often rely on outdated, medicalized notions of what it means to be transgender, and usually require transgender asylum seekers to desire, seek out, or obtain, some sort of medical procedure before approval. Additionally, to claim asylum transgender refugees must produce proof of persecution, which often requires them to retell experiences of trauma through categories such as gender reassignment, sex assigned at birth, their dead name, hormone therapy, etc. For asylum seekers, this requirement can add additional stress as these definitions might not be applicable to multiple cultures and as they are required to retell their experiences through Westernized vocabulary.

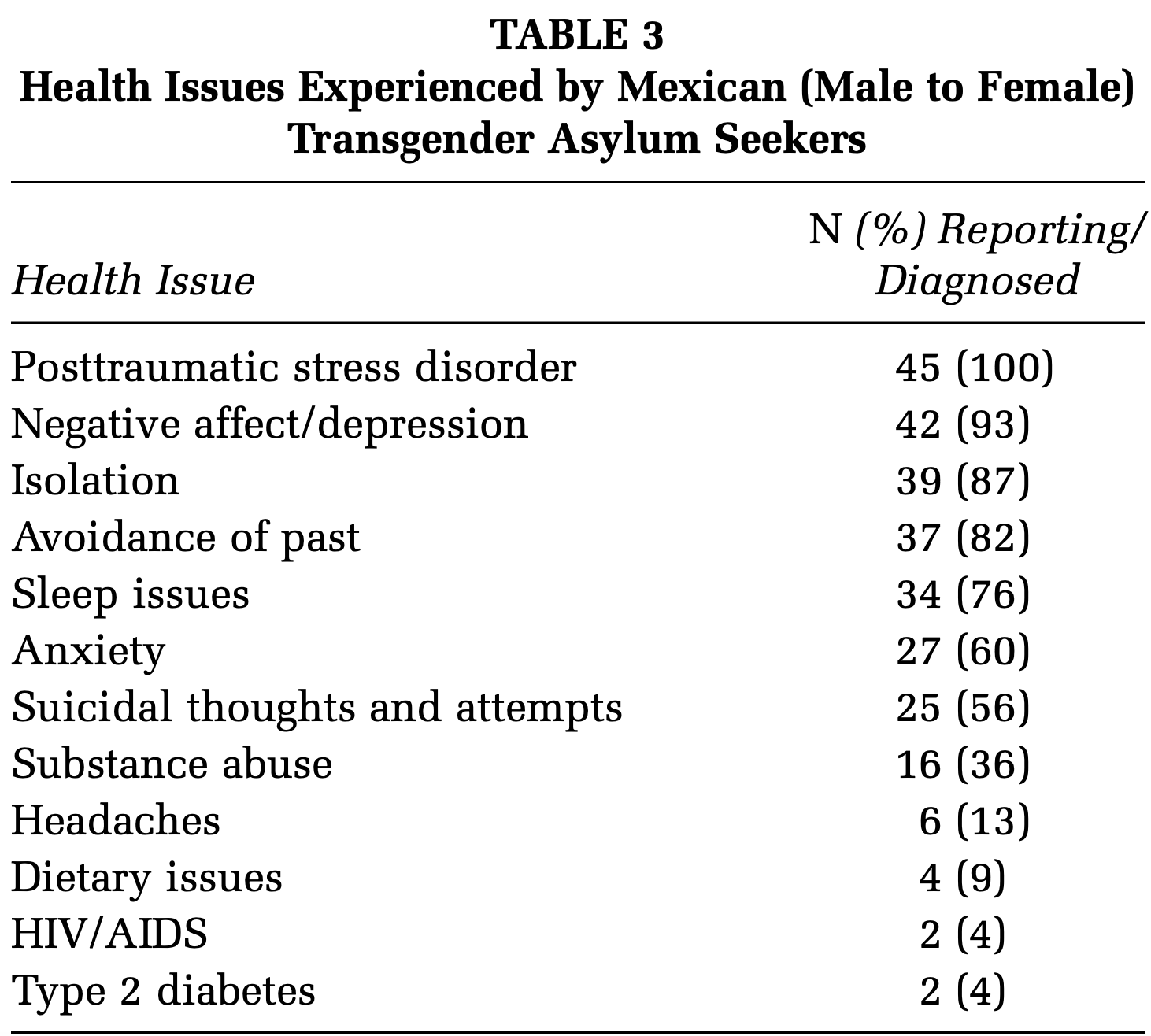
Health Issues Experienced by Mexican (Male to Female) Transgender Asylum Seekers

Also, because they are required to retell traumatic stories or discuss the abuses they experienced within their home countries, transgender persons face high levels of emotional and physical distress, and most asylum seekers report feelings of sadness, hopelessness, depression, and anxiety while seeking asylum. In the study focused on document review of asylum applications of Mexican transgender refugees, professionals diagnosed 100% of the asylum seekers with PTSD and diagnosed 93% with depression. Over half of the asylum seekers reported suicidal tendencies and several made attempts as suicide, to them, seemed like the only way to escape the verbal, physical, and sexual abuse they experienced. A report based on interviews from 28 transgender women from El Salvador, Guatemala, Honduras and Mexico, highlighted that all the women interviewed had survived physical assault, verbal violence, and denial of routine treatments while in detention. Transgender refugees in particular suffer from inadequate access to hormone therapy while in the asylum process, and often suffer from physical abuse within detention.

Transgender people may also be at risk while detained in the countries in which they seek asylum. NGOs such as Human Rights Watch Transgender Europe, and the National Center for Transgender Equality have reported cases of rape and abuse of transgender people in UK, US, Norwegian, and Greek facilities for asylum seekers. In the United States, Immigration and Customs Enforcement places transgender asylum seekers in a "transgender pod" where there is a lack of medical and mental health services. Additionally, some countries rely on a gender binary in their placement of transgender refugees during the detention process. Because of this reliance, some transgender refugees are placed in detention centers based on their sex assigned at birth rather than their gender identity. This placement adds another sense of mental distress, trauma, and physical abuse for transgender refugees.

Globally, asylum laws leave LGBT refugee detainees "particularly susceptible to heightened levels of physical and mental abuse."

=== Mexico–United States border ===
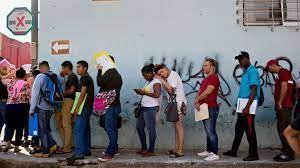
Asylum Seekers in Mexico

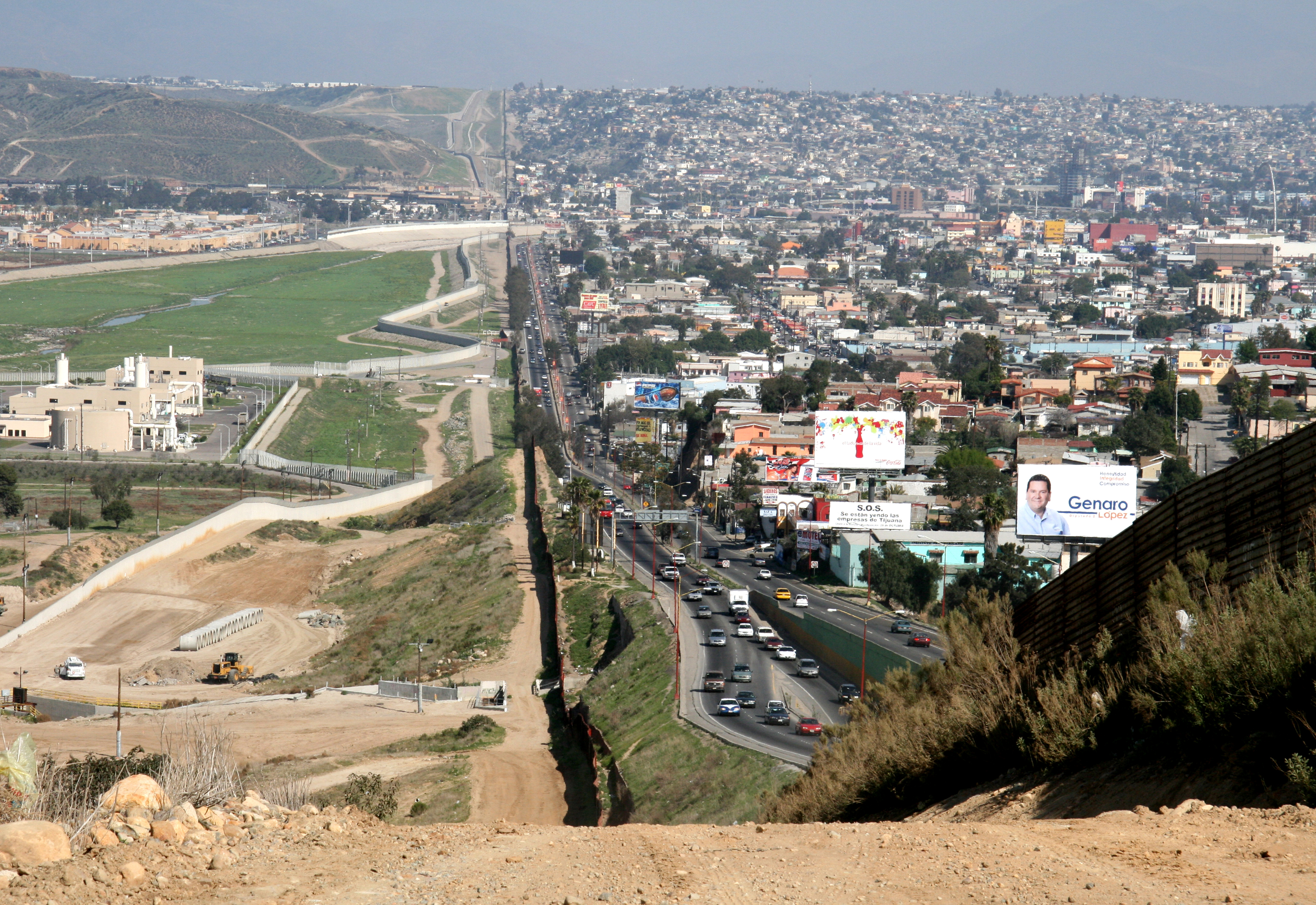
Mexico/U.S. border

Mexico has a highly militarized border in response to the 1996 Immigration Reform and Control Act which criminalized migration by increasing surveillance at points of entry and immigration checkpoints throughout Mexico. Following pressure from the U.S., Mexico implemented Plan Frontera Sur and the Prevention through Deterrence Policies which pushed asylum seekers and migrants to take more dangerous migration routes across Sonoran Desert terrains in Mexico to discourage migration from Central America.

Asylum seekers seeking refuge in the U.S. must remain in immigration detention centers once they file for asylum and throughout the duration of their case. In Immigration and Customs Enforcement (ICE) detention, transgender migrants are oftentimes placed in solitary confinement due to gender binaries in facilities. ICE Agents have also been reported for being responsible for perpetrating acts of sexual assault and harassment rather than other detainees.

Oftentimes, hormone replacement therapy (HRT) is denied in ICE detention facilities and ICE does not maintain accurate records of who receives treatment. For example, transgender refugees may only receive HRT if they were already undergoing such treatments before being detained. This lack of access may make them more visible during transition and hence more readily targeted for transphobic abuse. For instance, the Ninth Circuit in the 2022 Transgender Law Center vs. Immigration Customs Enforcements revealed that ICE redacted and withheld information about the death of a migrant in custody in violation of the Freedom of Information Act. The denial of medical treatment, including hormone treatments and medical treatments to combat HIV/AIDS, places transgender people at higher risks of mental and physical distress during the process.

In ICE detention centers, there is a lack of access to gender affirming care and facilities. Transgender women who are asylum seekers are oftentimes placed with cisgender men. In consequence, transgender women have experienced higher rates of rape, assault, and harassment from detainees and detention center staff.

== Asylum outcomes ==
When denied asylum, there have been reports of adverse outcomes for transgender persons. According to the ASPIDH Rainbow Trans Association, a transgender woman seeking asylum in the United States was killed in El Salvador weeks after her request was denied. One asylum seeker explains how "[they are] afraid to return to Mexico because the society is very homophobic. There is a lot of discrimination and abuse of transgender people in Mexico. The police do nothing to protect us, and often kill transgender people like me. There is no safe place for me to live anywhere in Mexico." The violence and discrimination faced by transgender persons create these adverse outcomes if they are denied asylum and required to return to their home countries.

Transgender persons may also face difficulties after being granted asylum because of their gender identity. The Williams Institute reported in 2022 that transgender asylum seekers may be disproportionately harmed by detention practices and face sustained mental health challenges as a result. Additionally, transphobic people, and transphobia exist within every part of the world, still leaving asylum seekers vulnerable to violence or emotional distress even if granted asylum.

== Legal issues and political debate in the United States ==
Since 2000, the United States has recognized transgender asylum seekers as a social group that deserves protection on the basis of gender identity. The lack of employment opportunities in their home countries, as a result of their transgender identity, sometimes means that transgender refugees were forced into prostitution as a means of survival. Despite the country's recognition of transgender asylum seekers, transgender refugees are sometimes disqualified under the United States' criminalization of prostitution, even if they are not engaged in criminal activity.

The United States' requirement that transgender refugees prove their identity also disadvantages them in the refugee process as many refugees are unable to begin transitioning until arriving in the United States. Transgender asylum seekers are not given a voice or agency during the asylum process. For instance, the Biden-Harris administration created stricter requirements for asylum proceedings which adversely impacted transgender migrants from Central and South America in 2021. The administration re-implemented President Donald Trump's orders, specifically Migrant Protection Protocols known as "Remain in Mexico" policy which required migrants and asylum seekers from Latin America to remain in Mexico while their asylum proceedings were being processed, specifically asylum seekers who were not Mexican nationals in 2019. Asylum seekers had their "pending" cases cancelled shortly after Trump's policy was implemented. The "Remain in Mexico" policy adversely impacted transgender migrants and asylum seekers in Mexico as they were required to remain in encampments following their "credible fear" interview which occurs prior to meeting an immigration judge. Transgender migrants are asked to "prove" their transition, gender identity, and sexuality during this interview. Throughout the COVID-19 pandemic, many hearings were cancelled or rescheduled causing migrants to stay in Mexico for extended time periods which impacted 850,000 immigration cases from being presented in front of a judge.

Some U.S. political activists have sought to improve conditions for transgender asylum seekers. In January 2025, President Donald Trump issued Executive Order mandate into law which specified that the federal government only recognizes two genders, either male or female. As a result, documents utilized during asylum legal proceedings can no longer protect transgender people from discrimination.

== Support and legal organizations serving transgender asylum seekers in the United States ==
In the U.S., there are many organizations available to support transgender individuals following the experience of gender-based discrimination in their home countries. Many provide free legal services and consultations through their website.

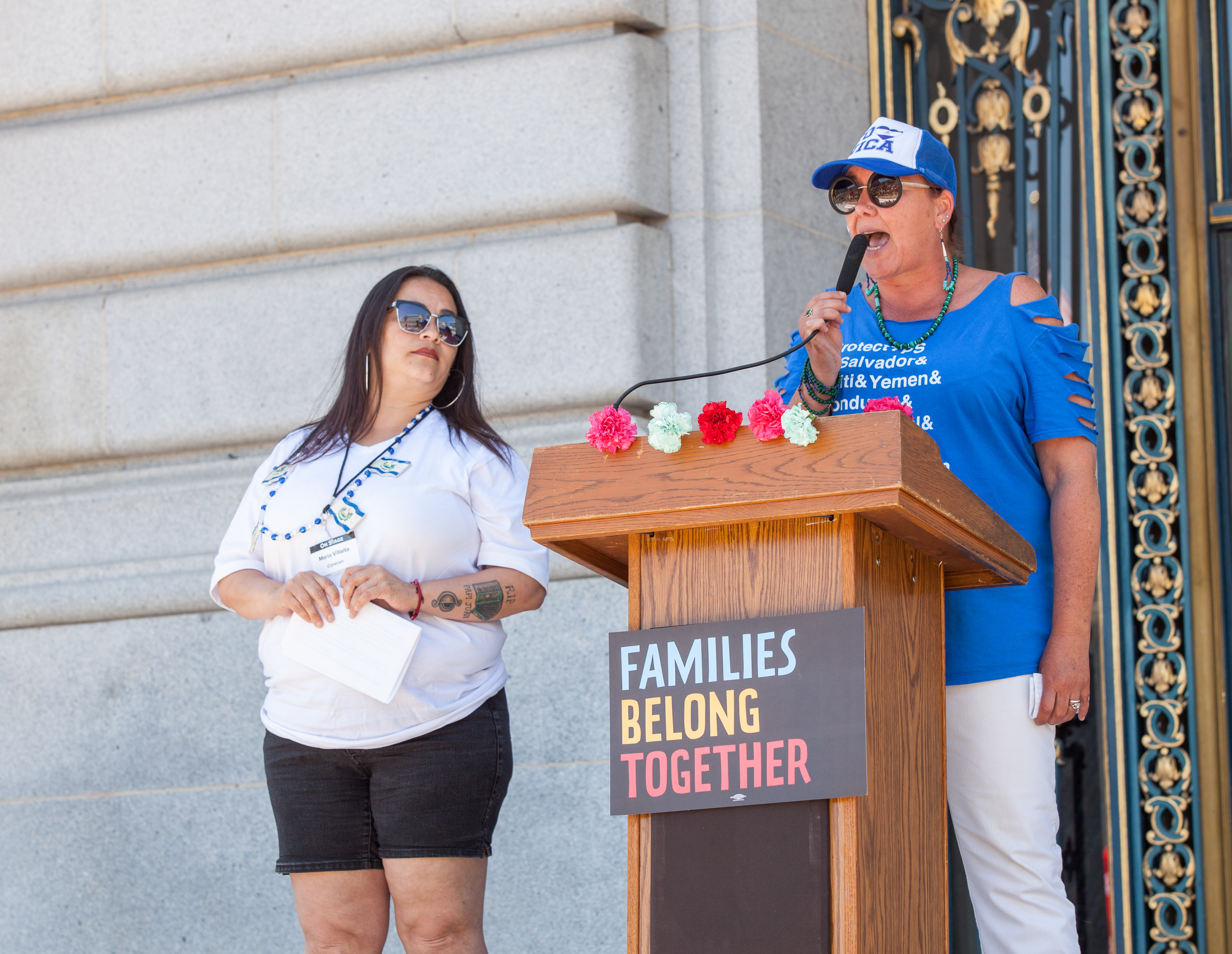
CARECEN-SF Rally for "Families belong together"

=== Southern California and Bay Area ===
In the Bay Area, East Bay Sanctuary Covenant (EBSC) provides legal services for low-income immigrants who have fled gender-based discrimination and violence in their home countries to support them with the asylum process. EBSC has historically taken on refugee cases from individuals with backgrounds of persecution in their home countries, such as LGBTQIA+ people, Indigenous people, domestic violence survivors, and those who have traveled unaccompanied to the U.S. EBSC supports immigrants with support services geared towards affirmative asylum, DACA, green cards, work permits, and the naturalization process in the U.S.

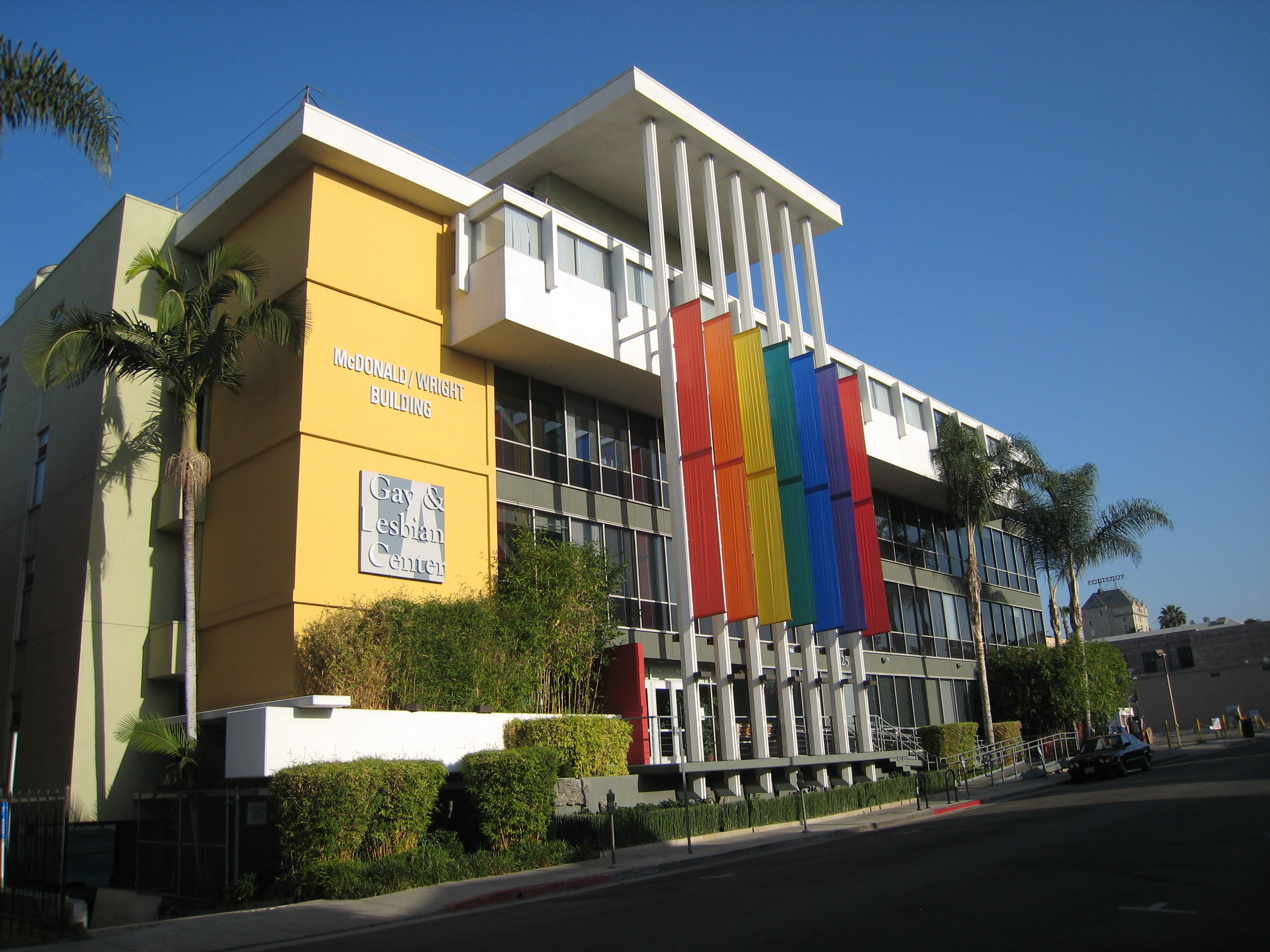
Los Angeles LGBT Center McDonald/Wright Building

Additionally, CARECEN-SF (Central American Resource Center) provides legal consultations and services for asylum applications from their team of paralegals and attorneys which is located in San Francisco. Moreover, CARECEN is also located in Los Angeles and San Bernardino which provides free legal consultations, screenings, and services for a variety of immigration cases. For example, Southern California's CARECEN Offices offer support for survivors of domestic violence and abuse.

In Los Angeles, the Los Angeles LGBT Center also provides support with finding stable housing and resources for individuals who have experienced detention and incarceration. Most importantly, the Los Angeles LGBT Center provides legal services for LGBT individuals fleeing from their home countries due to persecution and violence. The LGBT Center supports in preparing asylum declarations and providing defense for individuals held in immigration detention centers among other services.

The Transgender Law Center is a non-profit organization dedicated to supporting transgender individuals with their immigration cases. The Transgender Law Center also provides legal support. The Center leads the Border Butterflies Project Initiative alongside other organization to address the demand for asylum proceedings and legal defense at the U.S./Mexico Border.

== Countries of residence — Latin American transgender asylum seekers living in South America ==
=== Argentina ===
Argentina is widely considered to be a sort of "heaven" for trans migrants and asylum seekers due to the country's relatively low crime rates in comparison to other Latin American countries, as well as because of its progressive laws regarding transgender rights. It is because of such circumstances that the country receives thousands of migrants on a yearly basis, mainly from a Latin American, south-to-south basis (meaning that they are people from Latin America, born in the global south and moving within the global south).

Studies show, however, that many within the transgender migrant community in Argentina do not hold the opinion that the country lives up to its repute for progressiveness. Rather than provide a heaven, they argue that Argentina continuously pushes experiences of violence and marginalization upon them.

Such subjections to discrimination are often different from those which they experience in their countries of origin. Once they have been integrated into Argentinian society, trans migrants and asylum seekers, who are primarily from Latin America, often find it difficult to get access to healthcare and get hired for jobs in Argentina. Additionally, a high quantity of civilian reports regarding unlawful detainment and cruel treatment by police officers have been made by trans migrants in the country.

Unlike forms of discrimination experienced in their home countries, transgender migrants in Argentina are discriminated against not only because they are transgender, but also because they are migrants, creating an intersection of oppressive practices wherein "discrimination based on gender identity gets worsened by the migratory condition."

Despite their hardships, however, the Latin American transgender community in Argentina continues to find ways in which they can extend community building and demonstrate resilience. Many transgender Bolivians, for example, partake in a Bolivian migrant collective called Diversidad Bolivia en Argentina (DBA), where they use art practices (such as dance, performance, and fashion) to not only celebrate their community, but also respond to and defy Argentina’s intersectional discrimination of their people.

=== Brazil ===
To get Venezuelan asylum seekers and refugees to move towards the northern regions of the country and away from the southern states, the Brazilian government established the Interiorização Strategy in 2018. This voluntary relocation is perpetuated by the program's ability to help Venezuelan migrants attain jobs in the northern areas of the country. Overall, the program aims to alleviate some of the pressure which northern border states, such as Roraima and Amazonas, are feeling at the hands of Venezuelan migration into Brazil.

Yet, research shows that it is extremely difficult for LGBTQ+ individuals (particularly transgender people) within the Venezuelan migrant community to participate and get access to the program, as they are subjected to a level of discrimination in the job market that is worsened by their gender identity.

A great portion of trans Venezuelan migrants faced challenging realities while living in Brazil during the COVID-19 pandemic—not just because of the health and economic effects which the virus had on the nation as a whole, but also because of the discriminatory practices that were aggravated and intensified during the pandemic.

In an article published in 2022, all 12 trans Venezuelan migrants in Brazil who were interviewed claimed to have experienced severe financial hardships during the COVID-19 pandemic because of the intersectional forms of discrimination they faced while looking for work in an already dire job market. Several noted that it was extremely difficult for them to receive employment, even when the country began to employ programs aimed at decreasing the unemployment rate. One middle-aged trans Venezuelan woman named Emily stated, "It’s been a long time since I worked. I cannot find work because I am a trans woman. When I apply for jobs, I’ve always been rejected." Because of such precarious states of survival, many in the community have had to seek employment within unsafe work industries, such as sex work.

=== Peru ===
Through the conducting of personal interviews with 17 Venezuelan transgender women migrants in Peru, a 2025 study examined the pressures pushing forth this migration pattern. Besides looking at driving factors, the study also inspected the economic circumstances that supported such a people's movement in the first place. The majority of the interviewees reported experiencing employment, familial, and economic challenges once in Peru. The study reports that familial responsibility often complicates this group’s migratory stories, particularly regarding their quest for financial independence with the imposed duty of having to send remittances back home, even when under enormous financial stress.

== See also ==
- Asylum seeker
- LGBTQ migration
- LGBTQ refugees and asylum seekers in Canada
- Transgender rights
- LGBTQ refugees and asylum seekers
