= Sarah Ardizzone =

British translator, French to English

Sarah Ardizzone Hon. FRSL
- Born: Sarah Adams; 1970 (age 55–56)
- Occupation: Literary translator
- Awards: Marsh Award for Children's Literature in Translation (2005, 2007); Scott-Moncrieff Prize (2007)

Sarah Ardizzone Hon. FRSL (née Adams; born 1970) is a British literary translator, working from French to English. She has won the Marsh Award for Children's Literature in Translation twice (in 2005 and 2009), and the Scott-Moncrieff Prize once in 2007. She was elected an Honorary Fellow of the Royal Society of Literature in 2024.

== Career ==
Ardizzone has translated some 40 titles by writers including Daniel Pennac, Yasmina Reza and Alexandre Dumas. She specialises in translating sharp dialogue, urban and migrant slang – "a world literature in French". She also curates educational programmes – including Translation Nation, Translators in Schools and the Spectacular Translation Machine – and is a patron of children's world literature charity Outside In World.

In 2022, Ardizzone was appointed Chevalier de l'ordre des Arts et des Lettres for services to literature, and in 2024, she was elected an honorary Fellow of the Royal Society of Literature.

== Translations ==
- Small Country, by Gaël Faye
- The Little Prince (Joann Sfar's graphic novel version) – was a New York Times Notable Book of 2010
- Toby Alone, by Timothée de Fombelle – won the Marsh Award for Children's Literature in Translation, 2009
- Just Like Tomorrow, by Faïza Guène – won the Scott-Moncrieff Prize, 2007; shortlisted for the Marsh Award for Children's Literature in Translation, 2007
- Eye of the Wolf, by Daniel Pennac – won the Marsh Award for Children's Literature in Translation, 2005
- Kamo's Escape by Daniel Pennac – shortlisted for the Marsh Award for Children's Literature in Translation, 2005
- School Blues, by Daniel Pennac
- The Rights of the Reader, by Daniel Pennac
- Bar Balto, by Faïza Guène
- Men Don't Cry, by Faïza Guène – won the Scott-Moncrieff Prize, 2022

== Awards and honours ==
- 2005: Winner of the Marsh Award for Children's Literature in Translation for Eye of the Wolf, by Daniel Pennac
- 2007: Shortlisted for the Marsh Award for Children's Literature in Translation
- 2007: Winner of the Scott-Moncrieff Prize for Just Like Tomorrow by Faïza Guène
- 2009: Winner of the Marsh Award for Children's Literature in Translation for Toby Alone, by Timothée de Fombelle
- 2010: New York Times Notable Bookfor The Little Prince (Joann Sfar's graphic novel version)
- 2019: Shortlisted for Albertine Prize for Small Country
- 2022: Appointed Chevalier de l'ordre des Arts et des Lettres for services to literature
