= Theresa Hannig =

German science fiction author (born 1984)

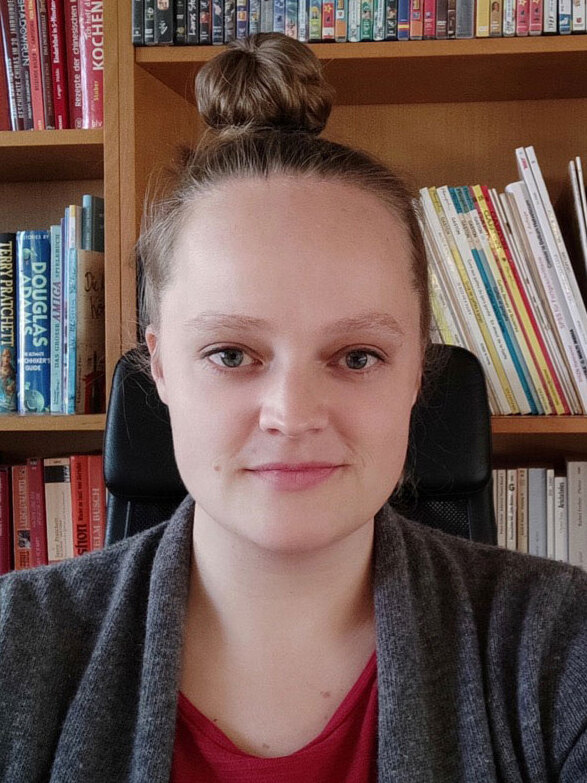
- Hannig in 2020
- Born: 21 June 1984 (age 42); Munich
- Writing career
- Genre: Science fiction
- Website: theresahannig.de

Theresa Hannig (born 21 June 1984) is a German science fiction author.

== Biography ==
Hannig was born in Munich on 21 June 1984 though she was raised in Kottgeisering and Fürstenfeldbruck. Hannig attended LMU Munich where she studied Political Science and went on to a varied career in software development, project management and as a lighting designer. She is married with two children. In 2016, her then unpublished novel Die Optimierer was awarded the first Stefan Lübbe Prize. This led to a publishing contract and her novel won the Seraph Award for Speculative Fiction in 2018 for the best debut novel. The sequel was published in 2019. Hannig has a mystery thriller published in 2021.

Hannig's work deals with data protection, basic income and automation. She gives talks on science fiction and digitization. She led a petition to increasing visibility of women and non-binary people on the German Wikipedia.

== Works ==
- Die Optimierer Bastei Lübbe, Cologne 2017. ISBN 9783404208876
- Die Unvollkommenen Bastei Lübbe, Cologne 2019. ISBN 9783404209477
- König und Meister Edition Roter Drache, 2021. ISBN 9783968150147
- Pantopia FISCHER Tor, 2022. ISBN 9783596706402
- Parts Per Million FISCHER Tor, 2024. ISBN 9783596708918
- Über Morgen. Geschichten aus einer besseren Zukunft Hirnkost, 2025. ISBN 9783988571410
