= Seraph Award for Speculative Fiction =

The Seraph Award is a literary award for speculative fiction written in German. It is given annually during Leipzig Book Fair. The award is organized and overseen by the Phantastische Akademie.

== Award ==
In the category "Best Novel", all works published by a publishing house within the current calendar year are eligible. The second category is "Best Debut Novel". This category includes prize money of 2,000 Euros. From 2012 to 2015, the award was sponsored largely by Stadtwerke Leipzig. Since 2016, the Leipzig Book Fair has been the main sponsor. The same year, a third category was established, awarding the best self-published novel ("Best Indie").

== Selection process ==
The winners are selected by a jury of 21 members who are newly nominated each year. The jury comprises fiction editors, journalists, bloggers, authors, literary agents, translators, booksellers, librarians as well as readers. The Phantastische Akademie and its supporters select the nominees from all submissions. From the list of nominees, the jury votes for the winners. The winners are announced at Leipzig Book Fair.

== Winners ==
Best Novel

- 2012 de: Christian von Aster : Der letzte Schattenschnitzer. ISBN 978-3-608-93917-0.
- 2013 Kai Meyer : Asche und Phönix. ISBN 978-3-551-58291-1.
- 2014 de: Ju Honisch : Schwingen aus Stein. ISBN 978-3-86762-170-0.
- 2015 Kai Meyer : Die Seiten der Welt. ISBN 978-3-8414-2165-4.
- 2016 de: Nina Blazon : Der Winter der schwarzen Rosen. ISBN 978-3-570-16364-1.
- 2017 de: Katharina Seck : Die silberne Königin. ISBN 978-340420862-3.
- 2018 Michael Marrak : Der Kanon mechanischer Seelen. ISBN 978-3-95869-257-2.
- 2019 Bernhard Hennen : Die Chroniken von Azuhr - Der Verfluchte. ISBN 978-3-596-29726-9.
- 2020 Christoph Marzi : Mitternacht. ISBN 978-3-492-28090-7.
- 2021 Ursula Poznanski : Cryptos. ISBN 978-3743200500.
- 2022 de: Joshua Tree : Singularity. ISBN 978-3-596-70087-5.

Best Debut Novel

- 2012 de: Nina Marewski : Die Moldau im Schrank. ISBN 978-3-03762-015-1.
- 2013 de: Mechthild Gläser : Stadt aus Trug und Schatten. ISBN 978-3-7855-7402-7
- and de: Jan Oldenburg : Fantastik AG. ISBN 978-3-492-70257-7.
- 2014 de: Katharina Hartwell : Das fremde Meer. ISBN 978-3-8270-1137-4.
- 2015 de: Akram El-Bahay : Flammenwüste. ISBN 978-3-404-20756-5.
- 2016 de: Daniel Illger : Skargat. ISBN 978-3-608-94642-0.
- 2017 de: Julia Lange : Irrlichtfeuer. ISBN 978-3-42651943-1.
- 2018 Theresa Hannig : Die Optimierer. ISBN 978-3404208876.
- 2019 de: Kris Brynn : The Shelter - Zukunft ohne Hoffnung. ISBN 978-3-7325-5777-6.
- 2020 de: Bijan Moini : Der Würfel. ISBN 978-3-85535-059-9.
- 2021 de: Theresa Jeßberger : Töchter der Freiheit. ISBN 978-3-7335-0641-4
- 2022 de: Eleanor Bardilac : Knochenblumen welken nicht. ISBN 978-3-426-52716-0.

Best Indie

- 2016 de: Hanna Kuhlmann : Nachtschatten.
- 2017 No "Best Indie" awarded.
- 2018 de: Janna Ruth : Im Bann der zertanzten Schuhe.
- 2019 de: Birgit Jaeckel : Das Erbe der Rauhnacht.
- 2020 de: Erik Kellen and Mira Valentin : Windherz. ISBN 978-3-748112167.
- 2021 de: Siegfried Langer : Das Buch, das dich findet. ISBN 979-8644510139
- 2022 de: Tanya Hartgers : Crimson Dawn. ISBN 978-3-7543-1213-1.
