= Toby and the Secrets of the Tree =

2007 children's novel by Timothée de Fombelle

Toby and the Secrets of the Tree, published in French as Les Yeux d'Elisha (lit. The Eyes of Elisha), is a children's novel by Timothée de Fombelle published in 2007. It is a sequel to the award-winning Toby Alone and continues the story of Toby and his efforts to save his parents, his friends and his home from devastation.

== Plot ==
Elisha Lee, once a friend of Toby Lolness, is being held captive by Leo Blue, who had become a ruthless dictator and wishes to marry her. She tried to escape from her egg in the Nest but was captured. Meanwhile, Toby Lolness, thanks to the guidance of two Grass people Jalam and Moon Boy, managed to return to the tree, but the two Grass people were caught along with other Grass People, while Toby managed to continue his journey in the tree. Meanwhile, Mano Asseldor was still hiding at Seldor Farm, which has been converted into a place to detain captured Grass People. The family, still living at the farm, tried all their efforts to prevent Mano from being caught.

At the Crater, Toby's parents, held captive by Joe Mitch, set up a night school for the Tree Council while they also tried to dig a tunnel out of the Crater. Sim Lolness, Toby's father, was often hauled out to be shown in front of a new convoy of Grass people, to check if any of the Grass People recognised him, to gather proof that the professor had ever sold the secret of his invention to the Grass People, as claimed by Joe Mitch. Sim Lolness, however, spotted Moon Boy wearing the emblem of the Lolness family, and tried to ask him where he got that from but got no response. Nevertheless, it raised hopes that his son was still alive.

Meanwhile, Toby meets up with another one of his old friends, Nils Amen, who is the leader of a band of woodcutters and is also helping to hide some fugitives in a secret forest in the tree. Nils pretends to side with Leo Blue, in order to give Elisha the message that Toby has returned. Meanwhile, the Asseldor family managed to escape along with Mano Asseldor while Mo distracts the soldiers by playing the cello (playing music has been outlawed by Joe Mitch by this time). The Asseldors managed to take refuge in Nils' hidden house. Meanwhile, while trying to find out how the Moon Boy got the emblem, Sim tried to arrange a meeting with him, but met with a soldier Tiger, who managed to take the emblem away from Moon Boy.

Nils' visits to the Nest, however, has aroused suspicions by his father, Norz and his friend, Solken, that he is on Leo's side, and both decided to kill him. At the same time, Leo found out about Nils' betrayal and vowed to kill him to next time he comes to the Nest. Elisha, in hopes of escaping, agrees to marry Leo, after receiving a secret message from someone (later revealed to be from Leo). On March 15, the day of the marriage, Elisha managed to escape with the help of a soldier. Elisha then ran towards Seldor Farm, where she managed to get Mo out of the farm after tricking some soldiers there, and went on towards to find her mother, Ilsha, back at the Lee household.

Meanwhile, Nils, not knowing the recent events, went to visit Elisha and found her gone. Leo and his men tried to capture him, but Nils managed to escape after noticing Leo's behaviour, but was then captured by the other woodcutters who believed he had gone over to Leo's side. Just before the other woodcutters were going to execute Nils for treason, Toby provides an alibi, explaining that it was a part of his plan that helped rescue Elisha.

Then, Elisha finds out that Toby is fighting Leo at the lake, and runs over, stopping the fight. She explains to Leo that they share a father, who was killed by Joe Mitch and not the Grass People. Leo realizes how much he has changed because of the terrible influences around him and his desire for power.

Leo ends up joining Toby in trying to find his parents, and then kills Joe Mitch himself. Toby kills Tiger, the guard who killed his biological father. Sim and Maya are saved.

Finally, the world goes back to normal, and the Tree ends up surviving, healing well after Joe Mitch had died.

== Characters ==
Toby – Son of Sim and Maya Lolness, Toby is a fugitive on the Tree with both Leo Blue and Joe Mitch after him. He attempts to rescue his love, Elisha Lee, from the Nest at the top of the tree, where she is going to be married to Leo Blue. He has just returned from a journey from the Prairie visiting the Grass people. He carries their mark: Designs drawn on the soles of his feet with caterpillar ink.

Leo Blue – Leo Blue is the son of the famed butterfly explorer, El Blue. His mother died when he was quite young and he was once best friends with Toby. However, his belief that the Grass People killed his father feeds his hatred toward the Lolness family and he eventually lands them all in jail. It is later found out that he is a half brother with his to-be bride Elisha Lee. He takes on the persona of the Shadow to gain closeness to Elisha.

Elisha Lee – Born of Isha Lee, the princess of the Grass people, and El Blue, Elisha is half-Grass person and half-Tree person. She carries the Grass people mark (foot decorations). She is said to be pretty and has a rebellious and stubborn streak. She is in love with Toby but is captured by Leo Blue to be married to him. She is held captive in the egg in the top nest of the Tree. She is Leo's half sister.

== Reception ==
Critical reception has been positive. Reviewers for the School Library Journal both praised the work, with one stating that "This interesting piece of eco-fantasy provides a satisfying conclusion for those who enjoyed the first book." The Horn Book Guide had a similar opinion as they felt that the book would be best appreciated by readers who had finished the first novel.

Kirkus Reviews was more mixed in their opinion, writing "Once all these people and threads intersect, the sheer quantity of coincidence and contrivance to tie them off neatly strains credulity to the breaking point. Nonetheless, the knit never quite ravels, displaying a brilliance and depth nothing short of dazzling. A mess, but a spectacular one."

Peter Berkrot, accomplished voiceover actor and audiobook narrator, calls this Toby book one of his favourite titles while BookTrust included it in the BookTrust 2010 Best Book Guide.
