= Tiny Owl Publishing =

British independent children's book publisher

Tiny Owl Publishing is an independent children's picture book publisher based in London. Founded in 2015 with the aim of creating picture books for everyone, Tiny Owl have published over 30 titles. Tiny Owl are the current joint regional winners of The British Book Awards' Small Press of the Year 2020.

== History ==
Tiny Owl Publishing was founded in 2015 by Delaram Ghanimifard and her husband Karim Arghandehpour, with the intent to focus on diversity and inclusion in children's picture books. In their first year, they published nine titles, all of which were translations of titles from Iran. Tiny Owl works closely with schools, libraries, and literacy charities.

== Awards and nominations ==
- Regional winner for Small Press of the Year 2020 as part of The British Book Awards
- Winner of the English PEN Translates Award for Felix After the Rain
- Winning Highly Commended in CLiPPA 2019 for Thinker: My Puppy Poet and Me
- Longlisted for Kate Greenaway Medal and English Association 4-11 Children's Book Award for Quill Soup
