= Timothée de Fombelle =

French author and playwright

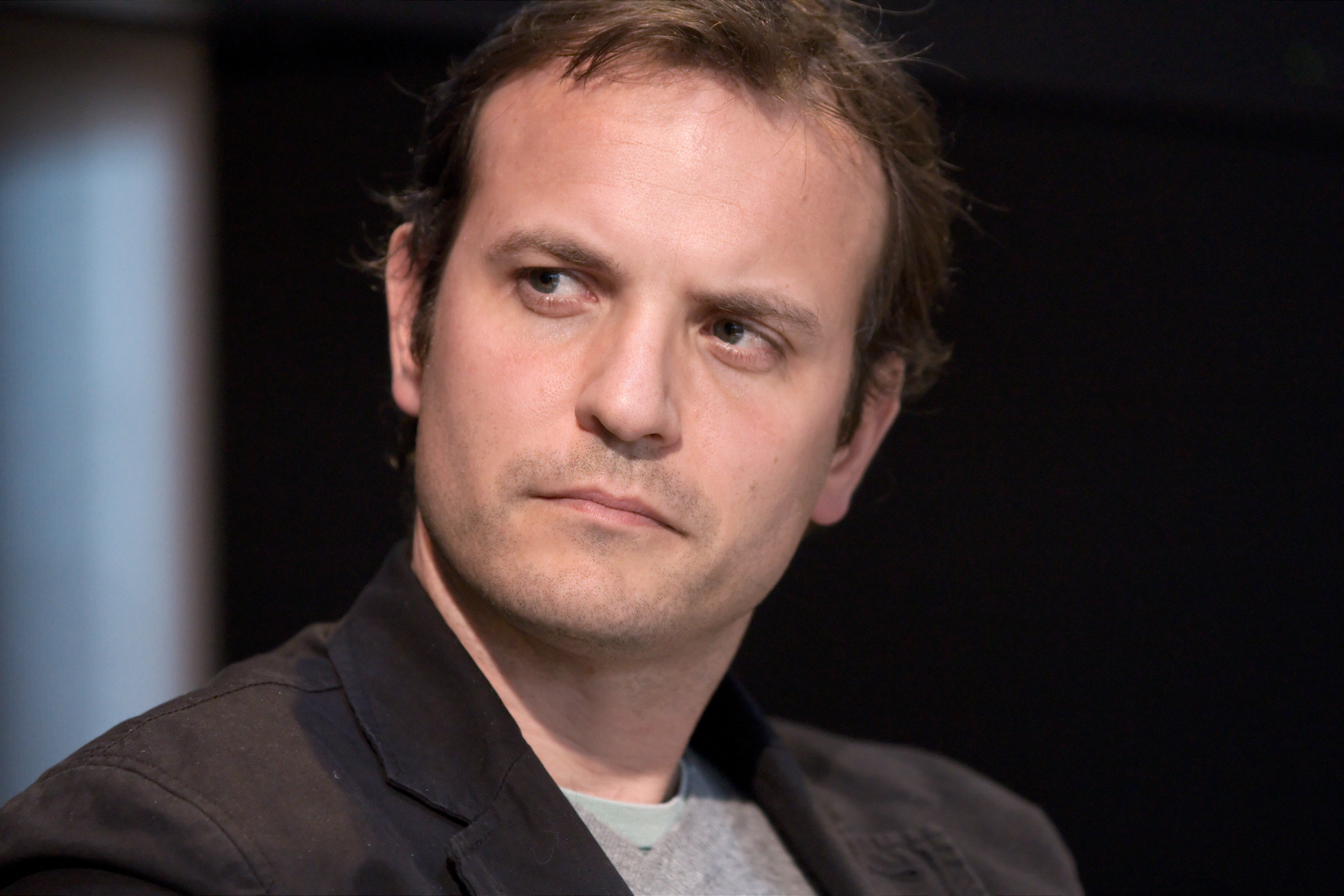
Timothée de Fombelle at the Salon du Livre in Paris, 2010

Timothée de Fombelle (French pronunciation: [timɔte də fɔ̃bɛl]) is a French author and playwright.

He has recently been recognized for his novels Toby Alone and Vango, and both of the sequels. His plays, which include Le Phare, Je danse toujours, and Rose Cats, have been translated into many languages, such as German, Italian and Greek.

== Biography ==
Timothée de Fombelle was born in 1973 in Paris, but his architect father often took him to Africa. Each summer, the family vacationed in the countryside in western France, where he and his siblings played in the woods, performed plays for their parents, and read the books in the library. At the age of seventeen, he founded the theater group La Troupe des Bords de Scène for which he wrote and staged.

At first he was a literature teacher. After teaching in Paris and Vietnam, he became a playwright. He builds his own sets.

He made his debut as a playwright with Le Phare, which he wrote in 1990 with actor Clément Sibony. Many of his plays, such as Je danse toujours, center on loss and fragility, but he sometimes writes comedies, such as Rose Cats. Je danse toujours was read at the opening of the Festival d'Avignon.

In 2006, he made his debut as an author with Toby Alone, a young adult novel published by Gallimard Jeunesse. The novel met with great success and has been translated into 29 languages. It has received 20 awards, including the English Marsh Award for Children's Literature in Translation, the Italian Andersen Award, and most French awards for children's literature. The movie rights were bought by Amber Entertainment (UK, United States). Toby Alone and its sequel Toby and the Secrets of the Tree tell the story of a boy a millimeter and a half tall who lives in an oak tree and must save it from destruction. "To me, the trees are green planets and like these trees, my planet earth is also endangered," said de Fombelle.

In March 2010, Gallimard Jeunesse published the first volume of a second duology, Vango. It takes place across Europe in the 1930s. The two books are called Between Sky and Earth and A Prince Without Kingdom.

In 2018 Timothée de Fombelle wrote the Candlewick "fairytale world" children's novel The Book of Pearl.

The English-language publisher of de Fombelle declined publishing a translation of his 2020 novel Alma, le vent se lève, for being a book about trans-Atlantic slavery written by a white European man.

== Personal ==
His wife, Laetitia, is an actress and amateur boxer. They have a young daughter named Jeanne Elisha, born in 2004. He is a Catholic.

== Bibliography ==
=== Plays ===
- 2001: Le Phare
- 2003: I Always Dance

=== Novels ===
- 2006: Toby Alone
- 2007: Toby and the Secrets of the Tree
- 2009: Celeste, My Planet
- 2010: Between Sky and Earth
- 2011: A Prince Without Kingdom
- 2012: Victoria Dream
- 2014: Two lives of Mr. Pearl
- 2017: Neverland
- 2018: The Book of Pearl
- 2020: Alma, le vent se lève

== See also ==
- Toby Alone
- Toby and the Secrets of the Tree
