= Kai Meyer =

German writer (born 1969)

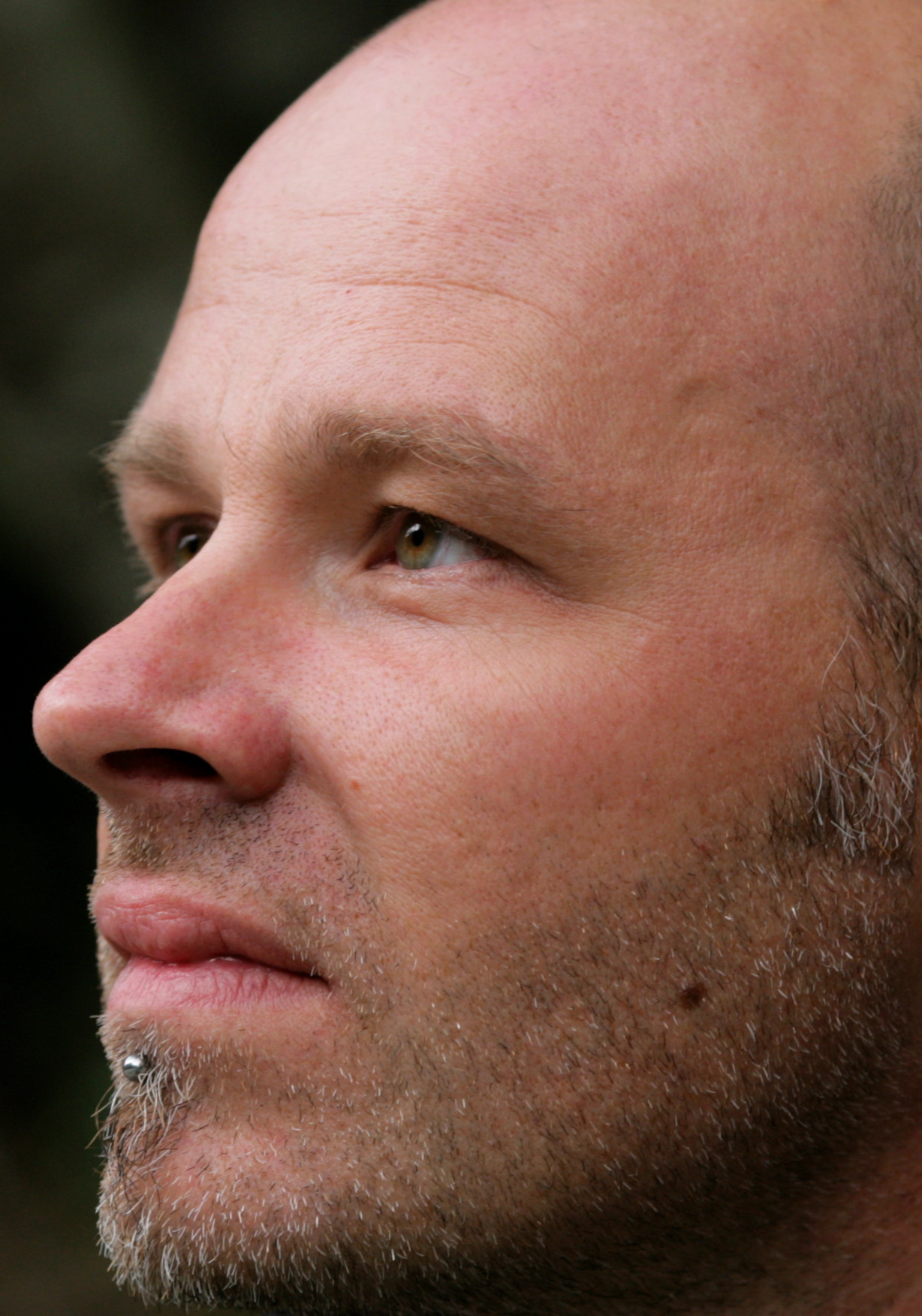
Kai Meyer

Kai Meyer (born 23 July 1969 in Lübeck) is a German speculative fiction writer. He has won multiple awards for his work including the 2013 and 2015 Seraph Award for Speculative Fiction.
