= LGBTQ migration =

Migratory movement of LGBTQ people

LGBTQ migration refers to the movement of lesbian, gay, bisexual, transgender, and queer (LGBTQ) individuals across international borders or within a single country. Many migrate to escape discrimination, legal restrictions, violence, and social stigma–such as homophobia and transphobia–related to their sexuality or gender identity. Others seek greater social acceptance, legal protections, or economic opportunities. LGBTQ migrants often face social exclusion, violent retaliations, and socio-economic challenges in their home countries. Globally and domestically, many LGBTQ individuals attempt to leave discriminatory regions in search of more inclusive environments.

== History ==
=== Background ===
In various countries throughout the world, homosexuality and being transgender are subject to legal restrictions. As of 2018, 71 countries criminalized homosexuality, with at least five countries and some regions in others imposing the death penalty for it. Additionally, in 47 countries and certain regions of others, individuals were not legally permitted to change their gender. Thirty-seven countries effectively criminalized being transgender, while 13 explicitly did so.

The legal status of LGBTQ individuals has influenced migration patterns, with some choosing to relocate to other countries. In addition to legal restrictions, social factors such as discrimination and violence by family members, communities, or authorities contribute to migration decisions.

LGBTQ individuals may seek to move to countries with more inclusive legal frameworks and social environments. Some migrate through educational or employment opportunities, marriage, or other legal pathways, while others are asylum seekers. Under the 1951 United Nations Convention Relating to the Status of Refugees, individuals may qualify as refugees if they face persecution in their home countries based on factors such as race, religion, nationality, membership in a particular social group, or political opinions.

In some Western nations, LGBTQ individuals from countries with restrictive laws are recognized as belonging to a vulnerable social group. However, migration patterns vary, and not all LGBTQ individuals relocate due to persecution. While many countries have anti-discrimination laws and policies, LGBTQ migrants may still encounter legal, economic, and social challenges.

== By region ==
=== Oceania ===
In the early 1900s, homosexuality was a legally recognized basis for deportation in Australia. The country began allowing homosexual immigration in the 1980s, and same-sex marriage was legalized in 2017.

LGBTQ individuals in Australia continue to face discrimination in multiple areas, including sport.

LGBTQ populations in Australia are commonly found in urban areas, a trend observed in many countries where urban centers are often regarded as more inclusive. Data from Australia and New Zealand indicates that LGBTQ parents are more likely to reside in suburban or rural areas. Children of LGBTQ parents living in these areas have been reported to experience higher rates of homophobic bullying at school compared to those living in urban areas.

=== North America ===
At the beginning of the 20th century, homosexuality was classified as a mental disorder and was used as a basis to prohibit queer individuals from immigrating to the United States and Canada. Canada permitted homosexual immigration in 1991.

==== Mexico and Central America ====
Studies on LGBTQ migration in the Mexico-Central America region indicate that LGBTQ individuals are particularly vulnerable to violence stemming from homophobia or transphobia, as well as risks such as physical and sexual violence. Many have experienced these threats throughout their lives, resulting in trauma. During migration, some LGBTQ individuals, particularly queer men and trans women, engage in or return to sex work, which increases their exposure to violence and risks to their physical and emotional well-being.

LGBTQ migrants may also encounter social inequalities such as racism, xenophobia, and economic oppression during their migrations. Some trans women adapt their gender presentation to appear more masculine during migration, affecting their gender expression, which was often a factor in persecution in their countries of origin.

In legal and bureaucratic processes, LGBTQ migrants may face homophobia, transphobia, and administrative systems that are not adequately equipped to address their specific needs. Transgender individuals, particularly trans women, frequently experience sexual violence and discrimination in shelters, where they may be denied accommodations that align with their gender identity. While some shelters cater specifically to LGBTQ migrants, restrictions on aspects such as social interactions, relationships, and expressions of affection may limit civil liberties.

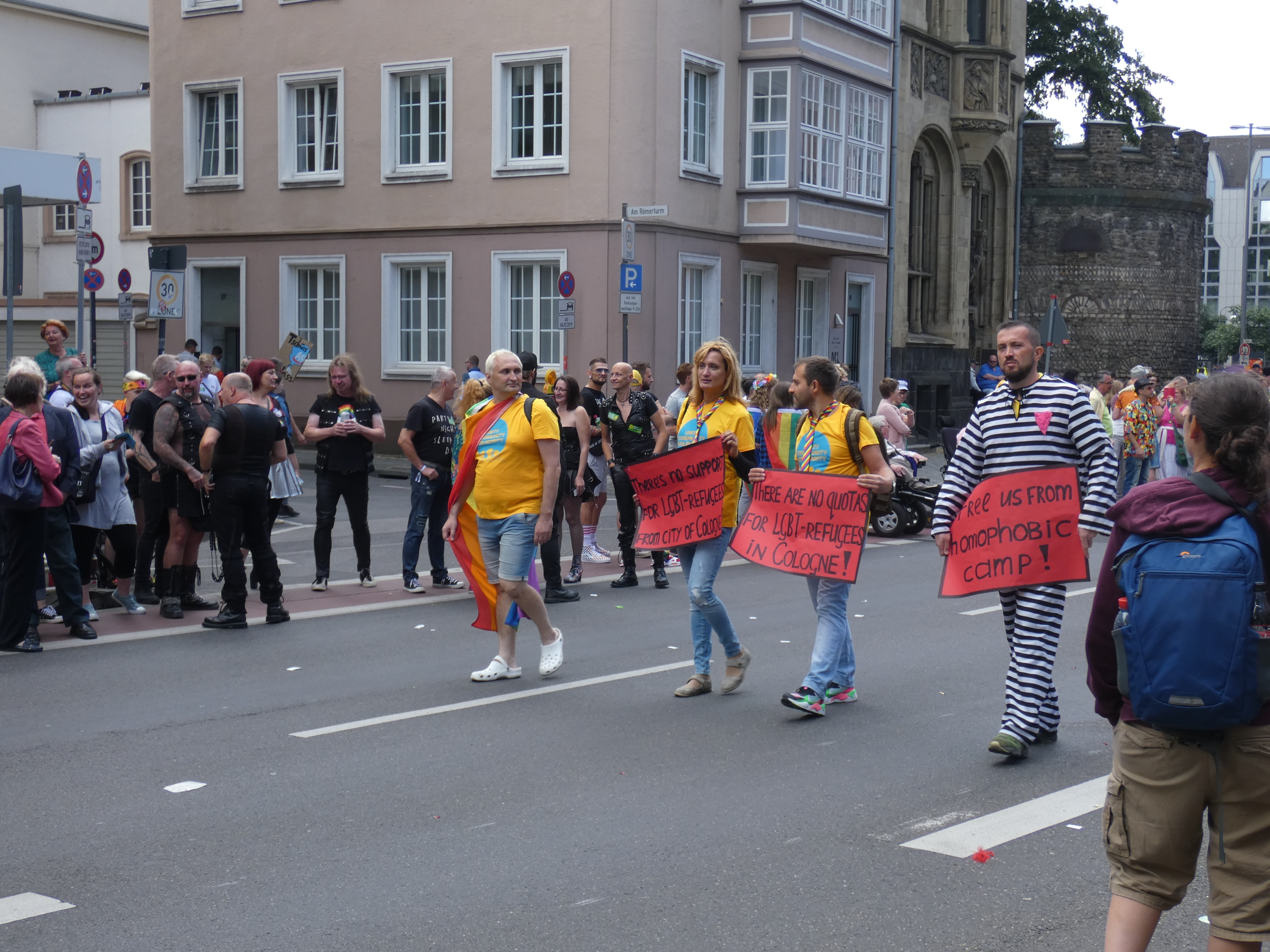
LGBTQ refugees at a demonstration in Cologne, Germany, 2019

==== Canada ====
Research conducted in the 2010s on LGBTQ immigrants to Canada indicates that support groups specifically designed for African and Caribbean LGBTQ immigrants provide various benefits, including improvements in mental health, employment opportunities, and housing stability.

==== United States ====
The Immigration and Nationality Act of 1965 was the first U.S. policy to explicitly prohibit "sexual deviates" from entering the country and required the Immigration and Naturalization Service to deport individuals classified under this category.

Since "sexual deviance" was considered a medical condition, sexual minority immigrants were barred from entering the United States for an extended period. In 1994, a policy change allowed sexual minorities to be recognized as members of a particular social group that could face persecution in their home countries, making them eligible to seek asylum in the United States.

In the United States, judges and immigration officials require that homosexuality must be socially visible in order for sexual persecution to be a viable complaint. Additionally, homosexuality must be regarded as a permanent and inherent characteristic for U.S. immigration authorities to recognize it in asylum cases. The United States Citizenship and Immigration Services reviews LGBTQ refugee and asylum claims in immigration courts. The complexity of legal procedures can make it difficult for asylum seekers to effectively represent themselves.

=== Europe ===
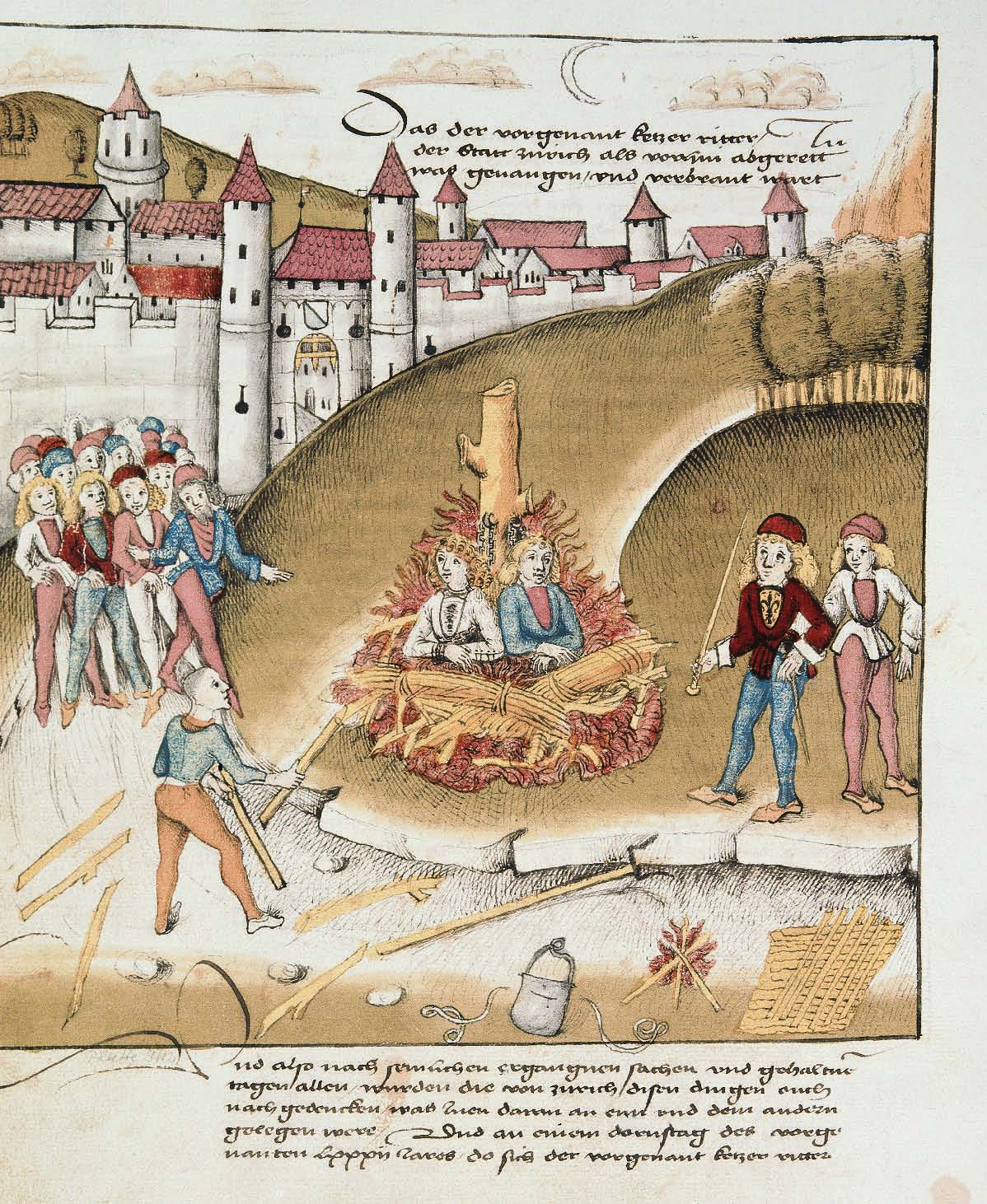
The knight of Hohenberg burned with his servant for sodomy, Zurich 1482

Europe generally has legal protections and policies that support LGBTQ rights, though attitudes and levels of acceptance vary by country. This variation has contributed to a perceived divide between countries with more inclusive policies, often associated with Western Europe, and those with restrictive laws or less social acceptance.

LGBTQ asylum seekers in European countries may face challenges in proving their sexual orientation or gender identity to qualify for asylum. Until 2010, many LGBTQ asylum seekers were advised to return to their home countries and conceal their identities.

In the European Union, transgender citizens have the right to free movement. However, in practice, they encounter legal and administrative barriers that limit their ability to fully exercise this right within the Union.

==== Great Britain ====
Legal protections against sexual orientation-based discrimination in employment were introduced in the UK in 2003. However, homophobia and transphobia continue to present difficulties for LGBTQ migrants.

Many Irish LGBTQ individuals have historically migrated to Great Britain, particularly London and other large urban areas, in search of employment and a more accepting social environment. Irish LGBTQ immigrants may experience vulnerability due to the absence of family support networks, homophobia, transphobia, and discrimination.

=== Africa ===
==== Uganda ====
The period leading up to and following the passage of the Anti-Homosexuality Act, 2014, saw an increase in LGBTQ Ugandans fleeing the country, with at least 400 seeking refuge in Kenya. Initially, the United Nations High Commissioner for Refugees prioritized the resettlement of LGBTQ Ugandan refugees in Kenya. However, as the influx of refugees continued, responsibility for their support shifted to Kenyan LGBTQ organizations, which often lacked the resources to fully address the refugees' specific needs.

=== Asia ===
LGBTQ rights in Asia are limited, with individuals facing discrimination, marginalization, and, in some countries, criminalization, including the death penalty. LGBTQ migrants from Asian countries make up a significant proportion of asylum seekers. A minority of Asian countries have legal protections and policies that support LGBTQ rights. Within the region, LGBTQ individuals migrate from less tolerant areas to more LGBTQ-friendly locations, both within their home countries and internationally.

Taiwan

In 2017, Taiwan legalized same-sex marriage, becoming the first country in East Asia to do so. This legalization has made Taiwan a destination for LGBTQ migrants from other Asian countries seeking a more inclusive legal and social environment.

==== Palestine and Israel ====
Compared to its Middle Eastern neighbors, the Israel has more LGBTQ-supportive policies for Israeli citizens and accepts LGBTQ asylum applicants. Although Israel ratified the UN Convention and Protocol Relating to the Status of Refugees in 1951, it has not explicitly adhered to its provisions. Nonetheless, some LGBTQ individuals from the Middle East have migrated to Israel.

Israel does not grant asylum to Palestinian LGBTQ individuals, citing the position that "there is no systematic persecution based on sexual orientation in the Palestinian Authority".

Some critics argue that Israel's stance on LGBTQ rights has been used to divert attention from its human rights violations against Palestinians, a practice known as homonationalism or pinkwashing. Anthropologist Sa'ed Atshan describes pinkwashing as the portrayal of Israel as a safe haven for LGBTQ individuals to attract tourism and international support. Critics suggest that while cities like Tel Aviv-Yafo are often portrayed as LGBTQ-friendly, the broader Israeli context is strongly divorced from the experiences and goals of queer communities across the rest of the Middle East and North Africa.

==== Nepal and the Philippines ====
Most families of LGBTQ emigrants from Nepal and the Philippines indicate that, although most emigrants' families do not approve of their lifestyles, remittance payments (i.e. when the person who left the country sends money back to their family) are a proven aid to breaking down the controversies surrounding their gender and/or sexual nonconformity.

==== Turkey ====
Turkey is both a country of origin and a country of asylum for LGBTQ refugees. The exact number of arriving or fleeing LGBTQ asylum seekers in Turkey is unknown since the state does not provide migration statistics concerning sexual orientation and gender identity. However, academic researches show that LGBTQ asylum seekers arrive in Turkey from North and Sub-Saharan Africa as well as the Middle East. LGBTQ refugees escaping from Turkey established a solidarity group in Austria.

== Current trends of migration ==
Prominent countries known for substantial LGBTQ emigration include Iran, Iraq, Jamaica, Pakistan, Saudi Arabia, Mexico, and Brazil.

LGBTQ immigrants are seen frequently to immigrate to Canada, Britain, and the United States. In 1994, U.S. immigration law recognized sexual persecution as grounds for seeking asylum. U.S. president Barack Obama ordered federal agencies to provide asylum for persecuted LGBTQ persons. In 2008, only Canada, Norway, Iceland, Denmark, the United States, and Switzerland had enacted immigration equality allowing for partner sponsorship.

Data shows nearly 4,400 people sought asylum from 2007 to 2017. But the exact number of LGBTQ people seeking asylum into the United States is not known as of 2020.

A documented trend, is an increase in migration by both family units and unaccompanied minors seeking asylum in the United States. The United Nations Human Rights Council reported unaccompanied minors, including LGBTQ minors migrations to the US had risen from 4,059 in 2009 to 10,443 in 2011, which had grown again to 21,537 in 2013. By 2014, 68,541 unaccompanied youth were taken into custody at the U.S. southern border.

The United Nations Refugee Agency reports that there are approximately 4.4 million asylum seekers and 26.6 million refugees worldwide. However, it is unknown how many migrants are lesbian, gay, bisexual, and transgender.

In reference to domestic LGBTQ migration, moving from smaller towns or rural areas to big cities is the most common trend of migration.

Experts on Migration and Human Security, reports that many individuals attempt to first migrate within their own countries of origin before seeking international asylum due to gang violence, poverty, and exploitative labor conditions. In cases of gang violence, youth are often targeted for recruitment; when they refuse, their lives are put at risk. Although relocating may solve their temporary problem within recruitment into a gang, new issues arises. Entering into new communities does not mean safety is always provided, as gang members may assume the youth are affiliated with rival groups or are deserters. Both of these scenarios can lead to violence or death. The most vulnerable are young women and LGBTQ individuals. Two female interviewees reported experiencing sexual harassment from gang members, while LGBTQ youth frequently faced death threats and murder attempts all occurring within their home neighborhoods. Economic hardship further drives migration, as many young people are forced into labor but are paid poorly due to their age and lack of experience, despite working equally long hours as the adults. Interviewees consistently reported that their earnings were insufficient to meet basic needs or support their families. Job opportunities were scarce in their hometowns, prompting many to leave in search of better employment prospects.

== Asylum seekers and migrants ==
Refugees, defined by the United Nations High Commissioner for Refugees (UNHCR), are displaced persons who "owing to a well-founded fear of being persecuted for reasons of race, religion, nationality, membership of a particular social group or political opinion, is outside the country of his nationality, and is unable to, or, owing to such fear, is unwilling to avail himself of the protection of that country." LGBTQ refugees are those who are persecuted due to their sexuality or gender orientation and are unable to find protection from their home nation. Individuals can seek refugee status or asylum in several different ways: they can register at a U.N. outpost, visit their intended country and a visa and apply once they are in the country, or they can make a report at their official government representation headquarters. Once a claim is filed, the intended country for reallocation evaluates eligibility of asylum requirements.[UNHCR] During meetings to determine eligibility and suitability, applicants face obstacles that can prevent them from making a successful claim.

Scholars have highlighted how changes in the U.S. criminal justice and immigration systems such as the expansion of detention centers and the increased targeting of specific populations—have facilitated the portrayal of migrants as disposable and criminal. Western media in addition, perpetuates this narrative and promotes a moral panic within society. This framing legitimizes state violence and exclusion while reinforcing a framework in which entire populations are labeled "deportable." These developments align with the analysis of scholars like Susan Coutin, who argue that such infrastructures essential to solidifying discourses that dehumanize migrants.

Óscar Martínez’s ethnographic work in The Beast underscores viewing migration through a "network of relations", a framework that captures the complex interplay of laws, policies, and societal attitudes that sustain the vulnerability and marginalization of migrants. This perspective emphasizes that migration to the United States is not simply a result of individual decisions but is driven by enduring conditions of political, economic, and social destitution in countries such as El Salvador, Guatemala, and Honduras. These experience also extend to LGBTQ migrants, who often face compounded risks due to their gender identity or sexual orientation.

=== Navigating the system ===
The first obstacle asylum seekers face is navigating the process in applying for refugee status or asylum. Some countries, including the United States, do not offer any legal assistance in making the asylum claim, requiring the applicant to find and fund their own legal representation. Many applicants inside the United States do not get a lawyer during this process and represent themselves. Other countries, such as the United Kingdom, offer legal aid, increasing the number of applicants who have access to legal advice and representation in applying for refugee status or asylum.

While many refugees share the same difficulties navigating the system, LGBTQ refugees face additional challenges due to the nature of their claim. Communities are built among LGBTQ refugees and asylum-seekers, leading to a network of advice about how to navigate the system. These networks help share success stories in navigating the system. Agencies funded by the government to resettle and assist refugees and asylum-seekers can offer further, more general assistance. According to Carol Bohmer and Amy Shuman, statistics show that chances of a successful asylum or refugee claim are greatly improved with legal assistance in the United States. Furthermore, the percentage of refugee claims admitted for LGBTQ claims tend to be lower compared to their heterosexual counterparts.

Refugees also face difficulty in securing housing once their application process is approved. In the United Kingdom, for instance, refugees can face difficulties integrating into neighborhoods, and are faced with gaps in provision, choices of housing options, and on-going support.

=== Credibility ===
Due to the nature of sexuality and gender claims, applicants often encounter issues with the credibility of their stories. Sexuality and gender identification is a private expression that cannot be determined by appearance. In seeking asylum, applicants are expected to prove their sexual or gender orientation as a proof of being a part of a particular social membership. They are also expected to prove that they are in fear of their life. Applicants applying for asylum due to sexual orientation are asked to present an "identity narrative".

The process of proving life-threatening experiences in home countries is one of the biggest challenges for LGBTQ asylum seekers. Many LGBTQ asylum seekers do not have any written records of being persecuted in their home countries which could increase their chances of being granted political asylum. The lack of documentation and records has created a bureaucratic obstacle disconnect when many LGBTQ migrants need to obtain legal access and social support. The primary purpose of documentation is to establish evidence of well founded fear of persecution, in order for the asylum seeker to find safety, security, and relief throughout their immigration proceedings. Migrants are also likely to find it difficult to explain their identity and past experiences in a way that is exactable to immigration officials. Many fear having their sexual identity recorded in state documents. LGBTQ migrants may not be familiar with the appropriate "identity narrative" that might assist in their cases. LGBTQ asylum seekers might also feel fear, guilt, or shame to talk about their sexuality or identity to state officials. Some of them may have been psychologically traumatized in their home countries, which also prevents them from successfully proving the violent experiences that led to their migration.

According to Neva Wagner, asylum claims in the United Kingdom face a "notorious challenge". Over 98% of sexual orientation claims were denied in the United Kingdom between 2005 and 2009, compared to the 76.5% refusal rating for all asylum applicants.

Bisexual claimants face an even greater challenge in providing evidence that immigration officials expect in asylum cases due to their dual sexuality. This can lead to a lack of clarity and understanding of their experiences. In bisexuality claims, claimants must demonstrate that they are at risk for persecution, even if their sexuality allows them to act in a heterosexual manner. The common presumption that bisexuals are able to choose partners from the opposite sex is one of the main reasons why they have more obstacles in the process of asylum seeking. The first known bisexual person granted asylum based on their sexuality in the United States was Apphia Kumar, who was first advised to apply as a lesbian.

British claimants also require evidence from an "expert witness"–someone with expertise on the country in which the person seeks asylum–and some countries require a medical documentation of physical and psychological harm done. These requirements decrease the credibility of the asylum seeker's own testimony as well as relying on homonationalist ideas to determine who is "queer enough".

Lawyer S Chelvan reported to the Huffington Post that the use of pornographic evidence–individuals taping themselves having sex with same-sex partners–has risen due to challenges to credibility of queer claims. Furthermore, immigration officials have refused witnesses for the credibility of queer asylum claims if the witness did not have sex with the applicant. Credibility becomes an issue, as many refugees keep their identity as being queer a secret from their own family and friends in order to avoid persecution.

=== Cultural differences in gender and narratives ===
The first step in verifying eligibility for asylum-seekers and refugee applicants is the initial investigation into why asylum is being sought. This is often done through applicant narratives, where the applicant is asked questions about their experiences and is then evaluated in how their story matches the eligibility requirements. In the U.K., initial credibility determinations are given great significance. Initial determinations are not reviewable by appeal, and if credibility is examined, initial determinations are given precedence. Retelling their experiences can be traumatic and unaligned with a chronological telling that is expected in Westernized narratives. Some asylum seekers may not identify with any of the accepted terminology in the country to which they migrate, such as "lesbian" or "bisexual". They may understand their experience as more fluid, informed by the standards of queerness in the culture and country from which they emigrated. There is also an inherent gendered expectation in narratives. Rachel Lewis writes that "The racialized, classed, and gendered stereotypes of male homosexual identity typically invoked by asylum adjudicators pose particular challenges to lesbian asylum applicants."

Women face additional obstacles, whether they are lesbians, bisexuals, transgender, or heterosexual. Women's narratives of persecution often take place in the home, so the violence experienced by females is often taken less seriously than males. Rachel Lewis argues that same-sex female desires and attraction are often overlooked in the U.K. cases, and applicants face a "lack of representational space within heteronormative asylum narratives for the articulation of same-sex desire." Simply put, lesbian narratives do not fit into the expected picture of an LGBTQ applicant. Instead, women are expected to be discreet in their affairs to avoid persecution. Persecution of lesbians can be seen as routine in countries where it is common for women to be raped; in that situation, every woman is at risk of being attacked, and their lesbian identity would not constitute being persecuted for being a part of a social grouping. Women who appear vulnerable because they are openly lesbian or foreign women "in need of rescue from oppressive patriarchal--read third world--cultures" are more likely to be granted political asylum due to sexuality than women who identify as lesbian privately.

=== Psychological aspect of LGBTQ migration ===
Research indicates that LGBTQ asylum seekers often suffer from poor mental health such as post-traumatic stress disorder (PTSD), depression, anxiety, and different complex traumas. These conditions are often driven by prolong exposure to discrimination, social exclusion, persecution, and substantial fear of violence faced in their home countries. Many LGBTQ migrants undergo threats, physical and sexual violence, rejection within their family and communities, and are coerced to mask their sexual and gender identity. There are deeper physiological undertakings through the immigration process. Individuals are often detained and isolated in hostile environments. Additionally, LGBTQ asylum seekers often face significant uncertainty while awaiting asylum hearings, as-well as the overarching fear of being deported back to the country they had previously fled. Throughout their hearings they can be re-traumatized as they are forced to recount the violence and hate they endured in order to seek asylum within the U.S.

== Notable case studies of LGBTQ asylum ==
=== Josie ===
In a legal case described in the book, Josie is a butch lesbian who had escaped gender violence in Honduras. She experienced corrective rape, which is a hate crime intended to correct or punish the individual due to their sexual orientation. In her testimony she indicated that police authorities raped her on multiple occasions. Her girlfriend was then raped by multiple policemen, essentially gang raped, and Josie was forced to watch. The police guards, as well as gang members, held Josie captive in her barrio for being a lesbian and having a fem-presenting girlfriend. She had been detained and deported twice from the U.S by Immigration and Customs Enforcement (ICE). In the first instance, she did not disclose her sexuality nor the violence she endured. She distrusted and feared the authorities because of her experiences with law enforcement officers in Honduras. She was then deported. The second time ICE arrested her, she chose to come out as gay and disclose in detail the violence she has endured. Although she had a strong case, her credibility was questioned because she had not disclosed her full story during her previous deportation. As a result, her asylum claim was met with skepticism. Whether the judge doubted her honesty due to her earlier silence or found the case insufficient for other reasons, the outcome remained the same: she was deported once again.

=== Santiago ===
Santiago was an unaccompanied minor from Honduras. He arrived at the U.S.-Mexico border, and a coyote, a human smuggler, helped him cross at sixteen. He identifies as a gay male and received counseling when he entered school in the U.S. In Honduras he was harassed and experienced violence from his father after he found out he was gay. His father called him slurs, while his mother would continually defend Santiago. She was then abused by her husband for standing up for Santiago. He found the worst treatment at school in Honduras. He was sexually abused by a male educator who forced him to perform sexual acts. His abuser stated that if he told anyone, he would kill Santiago's family. The abuse continued for a year. He was afraid his father would find out and beat him up, so he fled Honduras. He experienced similar sexual coercion by the coyote. He indicated that he was touched and forced to perform oral sex. Santiago was reunited with a maternal Aunt who was living in the US. He does not feel comfortable in disclosing his identity, a gay undocumented youth, as he fears he will find abuse and harassment. Santiago found additional unease in high school in the U.S. because he overheard students say slurs to each other.

=== Yaqueline ===
Yaqueline is a trans unaccompanied minor from El Salvador who migrated at sixteen. She came out as transgender to her parents at fourteen, and they disowned her. She was sex trafficked by gang members within El Salvador and then into Mexico. Yaqueline escaped from the gang’s control, migrated to the U.S., and immediately turned herself in to the border patrol agents. She disclosed her identity and notified the agents that if she returned to El Salvador, she would be in danger. In doing so, she believed the law would protect her. Yaqueline found that border patrol was being forceful with her when they took her into state custody. Despite telling authorities that she identifies as a girl, she was held in with young men. Yaqueline recounted that the agents took her clothes off to examine her body and laughed at her. She was left humiliated. She did not find the protection she believed she was going to receive in custody due to her disclosure. She eventually gained legal protection and obtained papers. She found that after she acquired legal status, she began to feel more comfortable disclosing her trans identity to her peers.

== See also ==
- Immigration equality
- Refugee women
- Transgender asylum seekers
