= Delessert =

Delessert is a surname. Notable people with the surname include:

- Adolphe Delessert (1809–1869), French explorer and naturalist
- Édouard Delessert (1828–1898), French painter, archaeologist and photographer
- Étienne Delessert (banker) (1735–1816), French banker
- Étienne Delessert (illustrator) (1941–2024), Swiss graphic artist and illustrator
- François-Marie Delessert (1780–1868), French banker and politician
- Jules Paul Benjamin Delessert (1773–1847), French banker and naturalist
- Jason Delessert, American who sued a hearing aid company after being denied medical coverage
