= Hans Christian Andersen Award =

Pair of literary awards

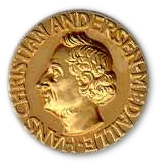
- Awarded for: Outstanding and lasting contribution to children's literature
- Presented by: International Board on Books for Young People
- First award: 1956; 70 years ago
- Website: ibby.org

The Hans Christian Andersen Awards are two literary awards given by the International Board on Books for Young People (IBBY), recognising one living author and one living illustrator for their "lasting contribution to children's literature". The writing award was first given in 1956, the illustration award in 1966. The former is sometimes called the "Nobel Prize for children's literature".

The awards are named after Hans Christian Andersen, a 19th-century Danish author of fairy tales, and each winner receives the Hans Christian Andersen Medaille (a gold medal with the bust of Andersen) and a diploma. Medals are presented at the biennial IBBY Congress.

== History ==
The International Board on Books for Young People (IBBY) was founded by Jella Lepman in the 1950s. The Hans Christian Andersen Award was first proposed in 1953 and awarded three years later, in 1956. It was established in the aftermath of World War II to encourage the development of high-quality children's books. The award was set to be given biennially and was initially awarded for individual works that had been published in the preceding two years. By 1962, the award's formal criteria were amended "to a living author who is judged to have made a lasting contribution to good juvenile literature by the outstanding value of his or her work. The author's complete works, in particular those in fiction, will be taken into consideration in awarding the medal."

Runners up were listed in 1960, 1962, and 1964. In reflection of what IBBY considered to be a trend of increasing quality in picture books, the award was expanded to include illustrators in 1966. From 1966 to 1996 runners up were named as "Highly Commended". In 1998, this was replaced with a list of three to four "Finalists". It is sometimes called the "Little Nobel Prize" or the "Nobel Prize for children's literature" and has been cited as the "most important activity" of IBBY. Between 1992 and 2022, the patron of the awards was Queen Margrethe II of Denmark. A special issue of Bookbird, a journal published by IBBY, is published as the award is given out.

== Jury ==
The winner of the Hans Christian Andersen Awards is selected by a jury which is put together by IBBY's executive committee. The Jury's president is elected by IBBY's General Assembly. There were initially seven jurors, but this was increased to eight and in 2000 to ten. Two years later, the jury was split with five members focusing on writing and the other five handling illustrations. The jurors are expected to be competent in children's literature and ideally represent a diverse group. It generally takes six months to review candidates and select a winner.

Jella Lepman served as Jury President for the first three Andersen Awards, 1956 to 1960, and remained on the jury until her death in 1970, as the President of IBBY and then as its honorary president. Current four-year terms cover two award cycles. Other notable presidents have included Virginia Haviland (1970–1974), Patricia Crampton (1982–1986), and Ana Maria Machado (1986–1990).

== Selection process ==
The award's regulations read: "The Hans Christian Award is presented every two years by IBBY to an author and to an illustrator, living at the time of the nomination, who by the outstanding value of their work are judged to have made a lasting contribution to literature for children and young people. The complete works of the author and the illustrator will be taken into consideration in the selection process". The award is explicitly designed to be an "international" work, and it is not explicitly given to a certain country.

IBBY has many member nations—all countries are eligible for membership. Every member nation has its own organization, known as a "national section", that is active across the country. All member nations can nominate candidates for consideration in the Hans Christian Andersen Awards. Some member states will repeatedly nominate the same author or illustrator, others nominate a new candidate each time. To nominate a candidate, a dossier is prepared that provides information including a list of works and biographical sketch. The portfolio must have between five and ten books by the candidate, which are sent to jurors, IBBY's president, and the "Jury Secretary". There were sixty-six nominees from thirty-three countries for the 2022 Hans Christian Andersen awards.

Each winner receives the Hans Christian Andersen Medaille, a gold medal with the bust of Andersen, and a diploma. These medals are presented at the biennial IBBY Congress.

== Writing award winners ==
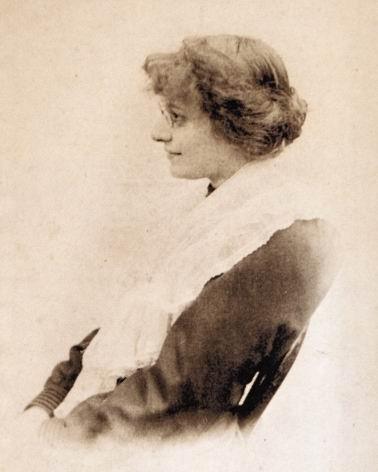
Eleanor Farjeon received the first award in 1956

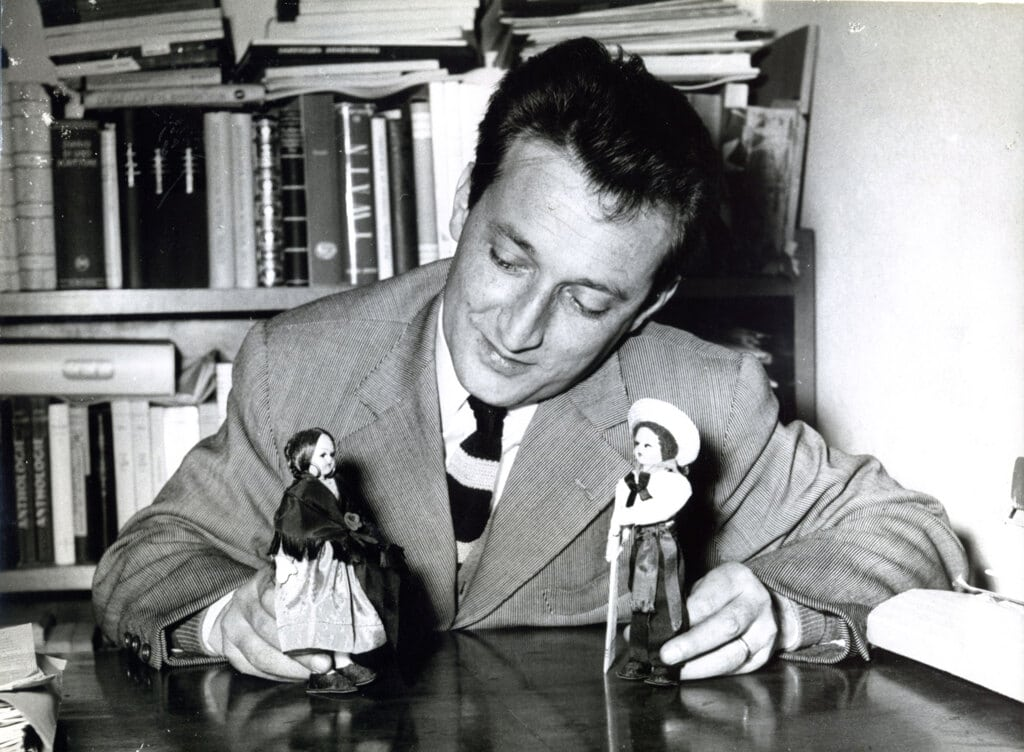
Gianni Rodari, who received the 1970 award

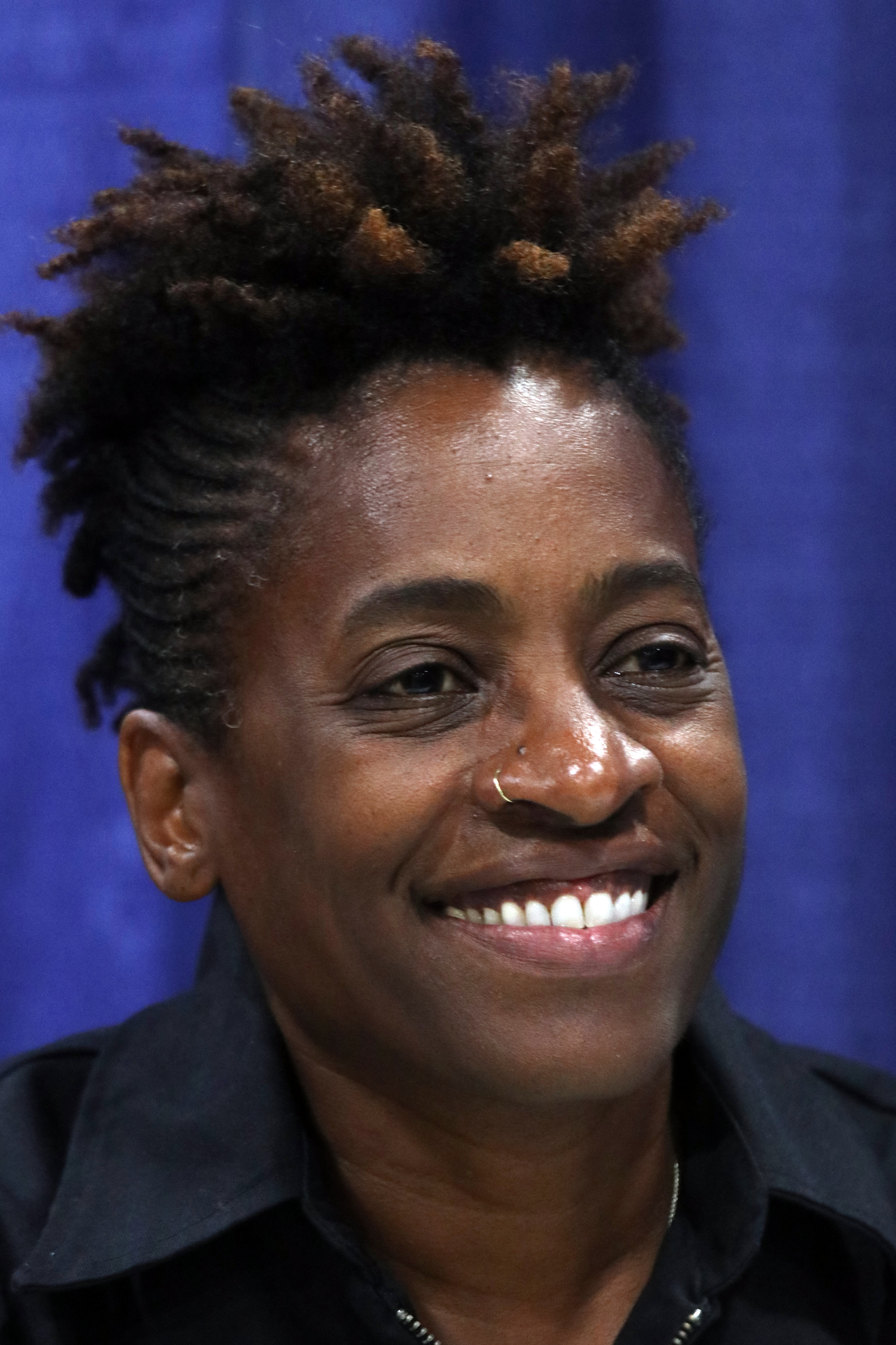
Jacqueline Woodson received the award in 2020

Winners of the writing award
Year	Winner	Country	Award
1956	Eleanor Farjeon (for The Little Bookroom)	United Kingdom	Winner
1958	Astrid Lindgren (for Rasmus på luffen)	Sweden	Winner
1960	Erich Kästner (for Als ich ein kleiner Junge war)	West Germany	Winner
1962	Meindert DeJong	USA	Winner
1964	René Guillot	France	Winner
1966	Tove Jansson	Finland	Winner
1966	Karl Bruckner	Austria	Highly Commended
1966	Gianni Rodari	Italy	Highly Commended
1966	José María Sánchez-Silva	Spain	Highly Commended
1968	James Krüss	West Germany	Winner
1968	José María Sánchez-Silva	Spain	Winner
1968	Gianni Rodari	Italy	Highly Commended
1968	Elizabeth Coatsworth	USA	Highly Commended
1970	Gianni Rodari	Italy	Winner
1970	Ana María Matute	Spain	Highly Commended
1970	E. B. White	USA	Highly Commended
1970	Ela Peroci	Yugoslavia	Highly Commended
1972	Scott O'Dell	USA	Winner
1972	Colette Vivier	France	Highly Commended
1972	Otfried Preußler	West Germany	Highly Commended
1972	Ana María Matute	Spain	Highly Commended
1972	Maria Gripe	Sweden	Highly Commended
1972	Sergey Mikhalkov	USSR	Highly Commended
1972	Siny van Iterson	Netherlands	
1974	Maria Gripe	Sweden	Winner
1974	Cecil Bødker	Denmark	Highly Commended
1974	Colette Vivier	France	Highly Commended
1974	Rosemary Sutcliff	UK	Highly Commended
1976	Cecil Bødker	Denmark	Winner
1976	Agnija Barto	USSR	Highly Commended
1976	E. B. White	USA	Highly Commended
1978	Paula Fox	USA	Winner
1978	Alan Garner	UK	Highly Commended
1980	Bohumil Říha	Czechoslovakia	Winner
1980	Lygia Bojunga Nunes	Brazil	Highly Commended
1980	Harry Kullman	Sweden	Highly Commended
1982	Lygia Bojunga Nunes	Brazil	Winner
1984	Christine Nöstlinger	Austria	Winner
1984	Patricia Wrightson	Australia	Highly Commended
1986	Patricia Wrightson	Australia	Winner
1988	Annie M.G. Schmidt	Netherlands	Winner
1988	Claude Roy	France	Highly Commended
1990	Tormod Haugen	Norway	Winner
1990	Bjarne Reuter	Denmark	Highly Commended
1992	Virginia Hamilton	USA	Winner
1992	María Elena Walsh	Argentina	Highly Commended
1992	Houshang Moradi Kermani	Iran	Highly Commended
1994	Michio Mado	Japan	Winner
1996	Uri Orlev	Israel	Winner
1998	Katherine Paterson	USA	Winner
1998	Brian Doyle	Canada	Finalist
1998	Ruskin Bond	India	Finalist
1998	Alice Vieira	Portugal	Finalist
1998	Anne Fine	UK	Finalist
2000	Ana Maria Machado	Brazil	Winner
2000	Ulf Stark	Sweden	Finalist
2000	Peter Dickinson	UK	Finalist
2000	Lois Lowry	USA	Finalist
2002	Aidan Chambers	United Kingdom	Winner
2002	Bart Moeyaert	Belgium	Finalist
2002	Bjarne Reuter	Denmark	Finalist
2004	Martin Waddell	Ireland	Winner
2004	Barbro Lindgren	Sweden	Finalist
2004	Bjarne Reuter	Denmark	Finalist
2004	Joel Rufino dos Santos	Brazil	Finalist
2004	Jürg Schubiger	Switzerland	Finalist
2006	Margaret Mahy	New Zealand	Winner
2006	Jon Ewo	Norway	Finalist
2006	Peter Härtling	Germany	Finalist
2006	Philip Pullman	UK	Finalist
2006	Toon Tellegen	Netherlands	Finalist
2006	Eugene Trivizas	Greece	Finalist
2008	Jürg Schubiger	Switzerland	Winner
2008	Bartolomeu Campos de Queirós	Brazil	Finalist
2008	Brian Doyle	Canada	Finalist
2008	Guus Kuijer	Netherlands	Finalist
2008	David Almond	UK	Finalist
2010	David Almond	United Kingdom	Winner
2010	Ahmadreza Ahmadi	Iran	Finalist
2010	Bartolomeu Campos de Queirós	Brazil	Finalist
2010	Lennart Hellsing	Sweden	Finalist
2010	Louis Jensen	Denmark	Finalist
2012	María Teresa Andruetto	Argentina	Winner
2012	Paul Fleischman	USA	Finalist
2012	Bart Moeyaert	Belgium	Finalist
2012	Jean-Claude Mourlevat	France	Finalist
2012	Bianca Pitzorno	Italy	Finalist
2014	Nahoko Uehashi	Japan	Winner
2014	Ted van Lieshout	Netherlands	Finalist
2014	Houshang Moradi Kermani	Iran	Finalist
2014	Mirjam Pressler	Germany	Finalist
2014	Renate Welsh	Austria	Finalist
2014	Jacqueline Woodson	USA	Finalist
2016	Cao Wenxuan	China	Winner
2016	Louis Jensen	Denmark	Finalist
2016	Ted van Lieshout	Netherlands	Finalist
2016	Mirjam Pressler	Germany	Finalist
2016	Lois Lowry	USA	Finalist
2018	Eiko Kadono	Japan	Winner
2018	Marie-Aude Murail	France	Finalist
2018	Farhad Hassanzadeh	Iran	Finalist
2018	Joy Cowley	New Zealand	Finalist
2018	Ulf Stark	Sweden	Finalist
2020	Jacqueline Woodson	USA	Winner
2020	María Cristina Ramos	Argentina	Finalist
2020	Bart Moeyaert	Belgium	Finalist
2020	Marie-Aude Murail	France	Finalist
2020	Farhad Hassanzadeh	Iran	Finalist
2020	Peter Svetina	Slovenia	Finalist
2022	Marie-Aude Murail	France	Winner
2022	María Cristina Ramos	Argentina	Finalist
2022	Fatima Sharafeddine	Lebanon	Finalist
2022	Peter Svetina	Slovenia	Finalist
2022	Annika Thor	Sweden	Finalist
2022	Margaret Wild	Australia	Finalist
2024	Heinz Janisch	Austria	Winner
2024	Marina Colasanti	Brazil	Finalist
2024	Lee Geum-yi	South Korea	Finalist
2024	Bart Moeyaert	Belgium	Finalist
2024	Timo Parvela	Finland	Finalist
2024	Edward van de Vendel	Netherlands	Finalist
2026	Michael Rosen	United Kingdom	Winner
2026	Ahmad Akbarpour	Iran	Finalist
2026	Timothée de Fombelle	France	Finalist
2026	María José Ferrada	Chile	Finalist
2026	Lee Geum-yi	South Korea	Finalist
2026	Pam Muñoz Ryan	United States	Finalist

== Illustration award winners ==
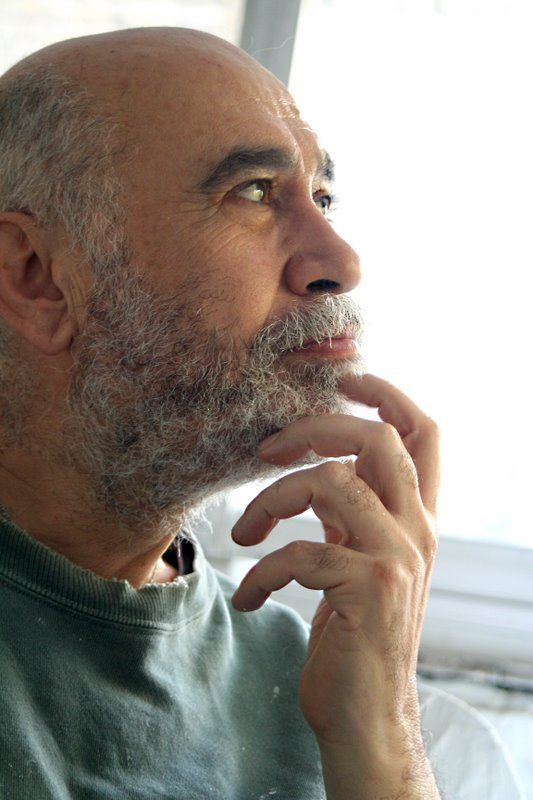
Farshid Mesghali, the 1974 recipient

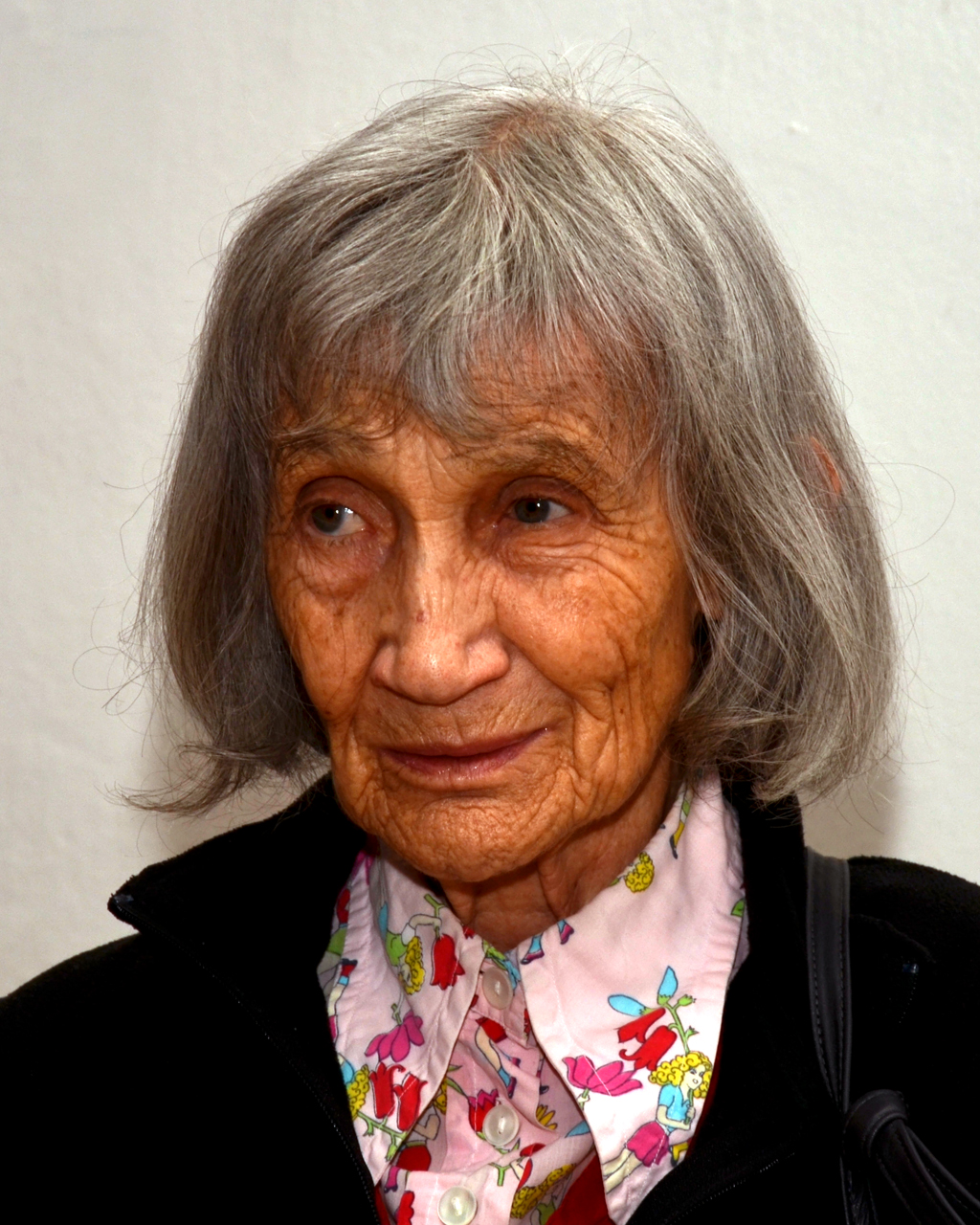
Květa Pacovská, the 1992 recipient

Winners of the illustration award
Year	Winner	Country	Award
1966	Alois Carigiet	Switzerland	Winner
1966	Jiří Trnka	Czechoslovakia	Highly Commended
1966	Brian Wildsmith	UK	Highly Commended
1968	Jiří Trnka	Czechoslovakia	Winner
1968	Ib Spang Olsen	Denmark	Highly Commended
1968	Brian Wildsmith	UK	Highly Commended
1968	Roger Duvoisin	USA	Highly Commended
1970	Maurice Sendak	USA	Winner
1970	Ib Spang Olsen	Denmark	Highly Commended
1970	Ota Daihachi	Japan	Highly Commended
1970	Lidja Osterc	Yugoslavia	Highly Commended
1972	Ib Spang Olsen	Denmark	Winner
1972	Elizabeth Cleaver	Canada	Highly Commended
1972	Adolf Zábranský	Czechoslovakia	Highly Commended
1972	Janosch	FRG	Highly Commended
1972	Petros Zambellis	Greece	Highly Commended
1972	Björn Berg	Sweden	Highly Commended
1972	Felix Hoffmann	Switzerland	Highly Commended
1974	Farshid Mesghali	Iran	Winner
1974	Helga Aichinger	Austria	Highly Commended
1974	Nicole Claveloux	France	Highly Commended
1974	Charles Keeping	UK	Highly Commended
1976	Tatjana Mawrina	USSR	Winner
1976	Ľudovít Fulla	Czechoslovakia	Highly Commended
1976	Svend Otto S.	Denmark	Highly Commended
1978	Svend Otto S.	Denmark	Winner
1978	Leo & Diane Dillon	USA	Highly Commended
1980	Suekichi Akaba	Japan	Winner
1980	Tomi Ungerer	France	Highly Commended
1980	Etienne Delessert	Switzerland	Highly Commended
1982	Zbigniew Rychlicki	Poland	Winner
1984	Mitsumasa Anno	Japan	Winner
1984	Helme Heine	FRG	Highly Commended
1984	Raymond Briggs	UK	Highly Commended
1986	Robert Ingpen	Australia	Winner
1986	Adolf Born	Czechoslovakia	Highly Commended
1988	Dušan Kállay	Czechoslovakia	Winner
1988	Yasuo Segawa	Japan	Highly Commended
1990	Lisbeth Zwerger	Austria	Winner
1992	Květa Pacovská	Czechoslovakia (Note: Pacovská received the award one year before Czechoslovakia dissolved into its constituent states.)	Winner
1994	Jörg Müller	Switzerland	Winner
1996	Klaus Ensikat	Germany	Winner
1998	Tomi Ungerer	France	Winner
1998	Binette Schroeder	Germany	Finalist
1998	Dick Bruna	Netherlands	Finalist
1998	Stasys Eidrigevičius	Poland	Finalist
2000	Anthony Browne	United Kingdom	Winner
2000	Rotraut Susanne Berner	Germany	Finalist
2000	Boris Diodorov	Russia	Finalist
2000	Maria Lucija Stupica	Slovenia	Finalist
2002	Quentin Blake	United Kingdom	Winner
2002	Grégoire Solotareff	France	Finalist
2002	Rotraut Susanne Berner	Germany	Finalist
2002	Daihachi Ohta	Japan	Finalist
2004	Max Velthuijs	Netherlands	Winner
2004	Rotraut Susanne Berner	Germany	Finalist
2004	Roberto Innocenti	Italy	Finalist
2004	Javier Serrano	Spain	Finalist
2004	Grégoire Solotareff	France	Finalist
2006	Wolf Erlbruch	Germany	Winner
2006	Lilian Brøgger	Denmark	Finalist
2006	Etienne Delessert	Switzerland	Finalist
2006	Isol Misenta	Argentina	Finalist
2006	Grégoire Solotareff	France	Finalist
2006	Klaas Verplancke	Belgium	Finalist
2008	Roberto Innocenti	Italy	Winner
2008	Isol Misenta	Argentina	Finalist
2008	Svjetlan Junaković	Croatia	Finalist
2008	Adolf Born	Czech Republic	Finalist
2008	David Wiesner	USA	Finalist
2010	Jutta Bauer	Germany	Winner
2010	Carll Cneut	Belgium	Finalist
2010	Etienne Delessert	Switzerland	Finalist
2010	Svjetlan Junaković	Croatia	Finalist
2010	Roger Mello	Brazil	Finalist
2012	Peter Sís	Czech Republic (Note: Sis was nominated by the extant Czech Republic. He was born in the former Czechoslovakia and educated there in Applied Arts. He has been a U.S. citizen from 1982.)	Winner
2012	John Burningham	UK	Finalist
2012	Roger Mello	Brazil	Finalist
2012	Mohammad Ali Baniasadi	Iran	Finalist
2012	Javier Zabala	Spain	Finalist
2014	Roger Mello	Brazil	Winner
2014	Rotraut Susanne Berner	Germany	Finalist
2014	John Burningham	UK	Finalist
2014	Eva Lindström	Sweden	Finalist
2014	François Place	France	Finalist
2014	Øyvind Torseter	Norway	Finalist
2016	Rotraut Susanne Berner	Germany	Winner
2016	Alessandro Sanna	Italy	Finalist
2016	Suzy Lee	South Korea	Finalist
2016	Marit Törnqvist	Netherlands	Finalist
2016	Pejman Rahimizadeh	Iran	Finalist
2018	Igor Oleynikov	Russia	Winner
2018	Pablo Bernasconi	Argentina	Finalist
2018	Linda Wolfsgruber	Austria	Finalist
2018	Xiong Liang	China	Finalist
2018	Iwona Chmielewska	Poland	Finalist
2018	Albertine Zullo	Switzerland	Finalist
2020	Albertine Zullo	Switzerland	Winner
2020	Isabelle Arsenault	Canada	Finalist
2020	Seizo Tashima	Japan	Finalist
2020	Sylvia Weve	Netherlands	Finalist
2020	Iwona Chmielewska	Poland	Finalist
2020	Elena Odriozola	Spain	Finalist
2022	Suzy Lee	South Korea	Winner
2022	Beatrice Alemagna	Italy	Finalist
2022	Ryoji Arai	Japan	Finalist
2022	Iwona Chmielewska	Poland	Finalist
2022	Gusti	Argentina	Finalist
2022	Sydney Smith	Canada	Finalist
2024	Sydney Smith	Canada	Winner
2024	Cai Gao	China	Finalist
2024	Iwona Chmielewska	Poland	Finalist
2024	Nelson Cruz	Brazil	Finalist
2024	Elena Odriozola	Spain	Finalist
2024	Paloma Valdivia	Chile	Finalist
2026	Cai Gao	China	Winner
2026	Beatrice Alemagna	Italy	Finalist
2026	Linda Bondestam	Finland	Finalist
2026	Gundega Muzikante	Latvia	Finalist
2026	Walid Taher	Egypt	Finalist
2026	María Wérnicke	Argentina	Finalist

== Winners by country ==
The winners are most often residents of Europe and North America; the first winner from outside that region was Farshid Mesghali in 1974, from Iran. After receiving the award, many authors and illustrators have their works gain wider recognition, particularly in the form of more translations. As of 2024 there have been award winners from 29 countries. Americans have won the most writing awards (6) and have the most award winners (7). Germans have won the most illustration awards with four.

Country	Illustration	Writing	No. of winners
United States	1	6	7
Germany	4	2	6
Japan	2	3	5
United Kingdom	2	4	6
Czechoslovakia	3	1	4
Switzerland	3	1	4
Brazil	1	2	3
Denmark	2	1	3
France	1	2	3
Austria	1	2	3
Australia	1	1	2
Italy	1	1	2
Netherlands	1	1	2
Sweden	—	2	2
Argentina	—	1	1
Canada	1	—	1
China	1	1	2
Czech Republic	1	—	1
Finland	—	1	1
Israel	—	1	1
Iran	1	—	1
Ireland	—	1	1
South Korea	1	—	1
New Zealand	—	1	1
Norway	—	1	1
Spain	—	1	1
Poland	1	—	1
Russia	1	—	1
Soviet Union	1	—	1

== See also ==
- Astrid Lindgren Memorial Award
- List of literary awards

== Bibliography ==
- Glistrup, Eva (2002). The Hans Christian Andersen Awards, 1956–2002. International Board on Books for Young People.
- Ellis, Alec (1973). How to find out about children's literature (3d ed.). Oxford: Pergamon Press. ISBN 0-08-016970-8. OCLC 624532.
