= Suzy Lee =

Korean illustrator and author (born 1974)

Lee Suzy
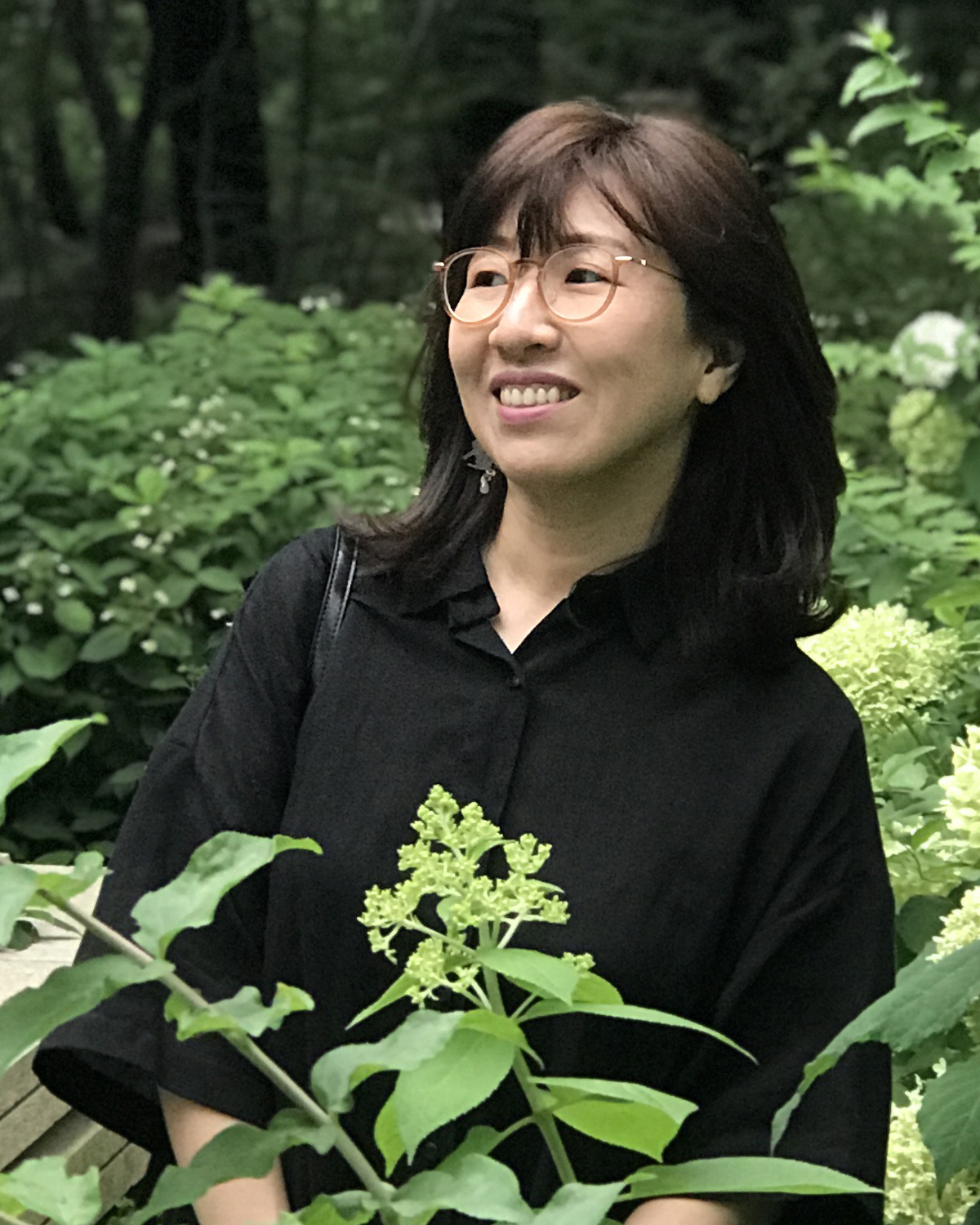
- Born: February 9, 1974 (age 52); Seoul, South Korea
- Occupations: Illustrator, author
- Writing career
- Language: Korean
- Genre: Children's literature, picture books, artists’ books
- Notable works: Mirror, Wave, Shadow; Open This Little Book, Lines
- Website: www.suzyleebooks.com

Suzy Lee (Korean: 이수지; born February 9, 1974) is a Korean picture-book illustrator and author. She is critically acclaimed as an artist who explores the pleasures and tensions that lie between reality and fantasy. She is also known for her remarkable achievements in the field of wordless picture books, or silent books. She gained global attention for her three works – Mirror (2003), Wave (2008), and Shadow (2010), known collectively as "The Border Trilogy" – using the center binding of the pages of a book as a means to create a narrative crossing the boundaries between reality and fantasy. Wave and Shadow were respectively named by The New York Times as Best Illustrated Children's Books of 2008 and 2010. Wave was also awarded the gold medal for Original Art by the Society of Illustrators in 2008. In 2016, Suzy Lee was shortlisted for the Hans Christian Andersen Award, regarded as the Nobel Prize for children's literature, an award which she received in 2022. Lee has received a number of other prestigious awards from around the world including the FNLIJ Award Luís Jardim for the Best Book without Text in 2008 and the Boston Globe-Horn Book Award for Excellence in Children's Literature in 2013.

== Biography ==
Lee was born and raised in Seoul. She received a Bachelor of Fine Arts in Painting from Seoul National University in 1996. She started out her professional career as an illustrator, but she soon became fascinated with picture books upon encountering the world of artists' books. She decided to pursue graduate studies, receiving her Master's in Book Arts from Camberwell College of Arts in London, England in 2001. The following year, she published her first book, Alice in Wonderland, which was also her final graduation project. Since then, she has published over thirty books. Lee organized projects such as the leader of the artist collective, Vacance Project, and illustrating Dream of Becoming Water, a book interpretation of a song by the same title by Korean singer-songwriter Lucid Fall.

== Career ==
Suzy Lee made her debut as a picture-book artist with Alice in Wonderland, which was the final project for her master's program. She participated in the Bologna Children's Book Fair with a dummy of the book and pitched it to publishers, eventually signing a deal with the Italian publishing house Corraini Edizioni in 2002. La Revanche des Lapins, for which she was selected for the Illustrator's Exhibition at the Bologna Children's Book Fair in 2002, was published in Switzerland the following year and recognized as one of "The Most Beautiful Swiss Books." Lee gained attention in the picture-book world for the publication of the series of three books, Mirror (2003), Wave (2008), and Shadow (2010), complemented by The Border Trilogy, a manual to the series sharing the details of her creative process and approach to picture-books. Beginning with her solo exhibition highlighting "The Border Trilogy" at the Museo d’Arte Moderna di Bologna (MAMBo) in Italy, Suzy Lee has been engaging with readers and audiences across the world through exhibitions and book fairs held in countries including the United States, Swenden, Germany, Brazil, Spain, China, Singapore, Japan, India, Mexico, Italy, France and Korea. In 2013, she illustrated the official poster for the Library of Congress National Book Festival. Later in the same year, she was honored with the Boston Globe-Horn Book Award for Open This Little Book. In 2016, she was shortlisted for the Hans Christian Andersen Award in recognition of the literary and aesthetic innovation qualities of her works. She received the award in 2022.In 2019, she received the 60th Korean Publishing Culture Award and selected for the IBBY Honour List for River, a book inspired by a personal story of her dog. She has founded Hintoki Press, an independent publishing house, through which she has directly published experimental works such as Sim Cheong and The Magic Jar. She also leads the project group, Vacance.

== Style ==
For Suzy Lee, the charm of picture-books lies in their power as a medium to convey the simplest truths in a simple yet refined manner. She uses a wide variety of materials from pen, pencil, charcoal, watercolor to acrylic, and different artistic practices including collage and print-making, depending on the book she is working on. She particularly enjoys using charcoal. Suzy Lee's books often the relationship between fantasy and reality.

== Awards ==
- 2022 Hans Christian Andersen Award Illustration
- 2020 Open Book Awards of Best Books Children and Young Adults Category, Taiwan - Wave
- 2020 The 60th Korean Publishing Culture Awards for Young People's Literature – River
- 2020 IBBY Honour List – River
- 2016 Shortlisted for the Hans Christian Andersen Award
- 2014 Please Touch Museum Annual Book Award, Philadelphia, U.S.A. – Open This Little Book
- 2014 Best Children's Books of the Year, Children's Book Committee at Bank Street College of Education, U.S.A. – Open This Little Book
- 2013 Picture Book Honor Winner, Boston Globe–Horn Book Award for Excellence in Children's Literature, U.S.A.- Open This Little Book
- 2010 Best Illustrated Album (Premio Album Ilustrado), El Gremio de Librerías de Madrid, Spain – Wave
- 2010 FNLIJ Award Luís Jardim – The Best Book without Text (Prêmio FNLIJ Luís Jardim – O Melhor Livro de Imagem), FNLIJ (Fundação Nacional do Livro Infantil e Juvenil), Brazil – Wave
- 2010 The Best Illustrated Children's Books, The New York Times, U.S.A. – Shadow
- 2008 The Best Illustrated Children's Books, The New York Times, U.S.A. – Wave
- 2008 Best Books, Publishers Weekly, U.S.A. – Wave
- 2008 Best Books, School Library Journal, U.S.A. – Wave
- 2008 The Best Books of the Year, Kirkus Review, U.S.A. – Wave
- 2008 Gold Medal, Original Art Award, Society of Illustrators, U.S.A. – Wave
- 2008 Notable Children's Books in the Language Arts, Children's Literature Assembly of the National Council of Teachers of English, U.S.A. – The Zoo
- 2005 The Illustrators Exhibition, Bologna Children's Book Fair, Italy – The Black Bird
- 2003 The Most Beautiful Swiss Books, Swiss Federal Office of Culture, Switzerland – La Revanche des Lapins
- 2002 The Illustrators Exhibition, Bologna Children's Book Fair, Italy – La Revanche des Lapins

== Works ==
- 2020 Fart Match (Hintoki Press) ISBN 979-11-967188-6-2
- 2020 Hill Over Hill (Hintoki Press) ISBN 979-11-967188-5-5
- 2019 Sim Cheong (Hintoki Press) ISBN 979-11-967188-1-7
- 2019 The Magic Jar (Hintoki Press) ISBN 979-11-967188-2-4
- 2019 The Boy Who Bought the Shade Under the Tree (Hintoki Press) ISBN 979-11-967188-3-1
- 2018 River (BIR Publishing Co.) ISBN 978-8-875707-63-7
- 2018 Lines (Chronicle Books) ISBN 1452156654
- 2018 The Border Trilogy (Corraini Edizioni) ISBN 978-88-757071-6-3
- 2010 Shadow(Chronicle Books) ISBN 978-0-8118-7280-5
- 2008 Wave (Chronicle Books) ISBN 978-0-8118-5924-0
- 2008 My Bright Atelier (BIR Publishing Co.) ISBN 978-8-949101-60-6
- 2007 The Black Bird (Gilbut Children Publishing Co.) ISBN 978-8-990025-30-2
- 2006 Action Korean Alphabet (Gilbut Children Publishing Co.) ISBN 978-89-558217-9-6
- 2004 The Zoo(BIR Publishing Co.) ISBN 978-89-491-0047-0
- 2003 Mirror (Edizioni Corraini) ISBN 978-8-887942-40-8
- 2003 La Revanche des Lapins (La Joie de Lire) ISBN 978-2882582485
- 2002 Alice in Wonderland (Corraini Edizioni) ISBN 978-88-87942-27-9 *Currently housed in the Tate Modern’s Collection of Artist Books (London, U.K.)

=== Collaborations with other authors ===
- 2022 See You Someday Soon with Pat Zietlow Miller (Roaring Brook Press) ISBN 9781250221100
- 2020 The Yulu Linen with Cao Wenxuan (Bear Books) ISBN 979-11-583618-2-2
- 2020 Dream of Becoming Water with Lucid Fall (Chungaram Media) ISBN 979-11-587113-1-3
- 2017 This Beautiful Day with Richard Jackson (Atheneum) ISBN 978-14-814413-9-1
- 2015 Ask Me with Bernard Waber (Houghton Mifflin) ISBN 978-0547733944
- 2013 Open This Little Book by Jesse Klausmeier (Chronicle Books) ISBN 978-08-118678-3-2
- 2013 Love You, My Baby with Mun Hye-jin (BIR Publishing Co.) ISBN 978-89-491185-0-5
- 2008 Shadow is My Friend with Park Jung-Sun (Chondung Books) ISBN 978-89-900255-9-3
- 2008 Open the Door! with Park Jung-Sun (BIR Publishing Co) ISBN 978-89-491517-1-7
- 2005 The Naked Painters with Moon Seung-Yeon (Chondung Books) ISBN 978-89-900250-9-8
