= François-Marie Delessert =

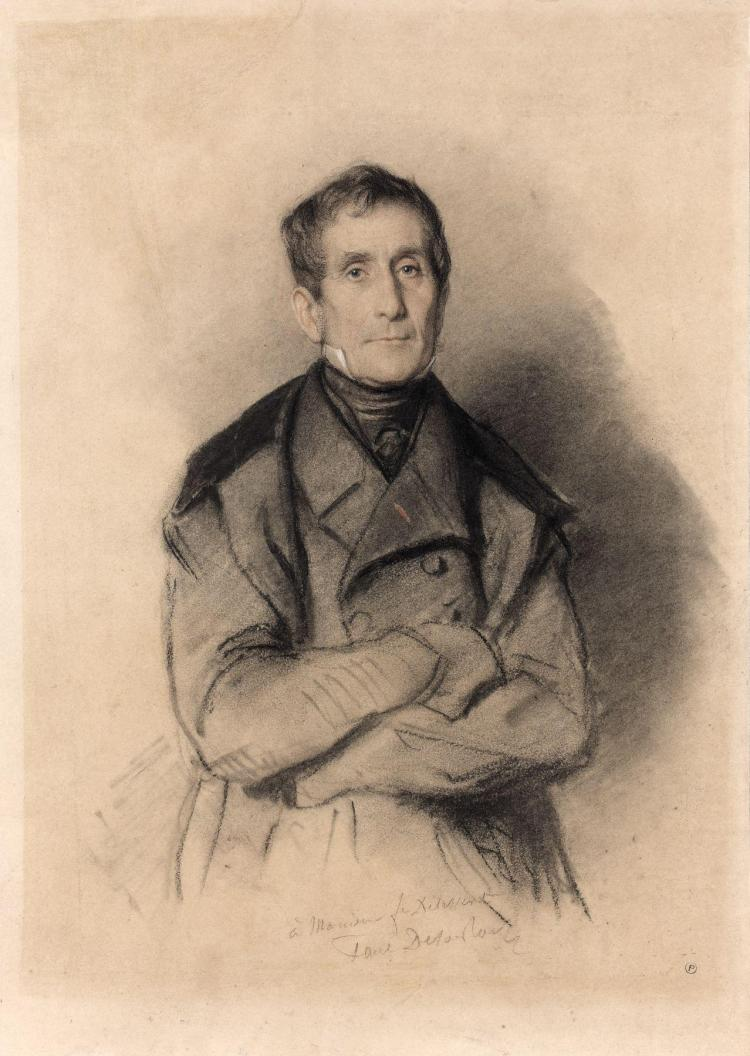
Sketch of Delessert by Paul Delaroche.

François-Marie Delessert (2 April 1780 - 15 October 1868) was a French banker and politician.

Born in Lyon, he was the second son of the banker Étienne Delessert. He studied in Geneva and in 1796 joined the Caisse d'Épargne, a banking house founded by his father. Soon, he and his elder brother Benjamin were directing the house.

He died in Passy.
