= Éditions du Seuil =

French publisher established in 1935

- Parent company: La Martinière Groupe (Média-Participations)
- Founded: 1935; 91 years ago
- Country of origin: France
- Headquarters location: Paris
- Publication types: Books
- Official website: www.seuil.com

Éditions du Seuil (French: [edisjɔ̃ dy sœj]), also known as Le Seuil, is a French publishing house established in 1935 by Catholic intellectual Jean Plaquevent (1901–1965), and currently owned by La Martinière Groupe. It owes its name to this goal "The seuil (threshold) is the whole excitement of parting and arriving. It is also the brand new threshold that we refashion at the door of the Church to allow entry to many whose foot gropes around it" (Jean Plaquevent, letter dated 28 December 1934).

== Description ==
Éditions du Seuil was the publisher of the Don Camillo series, and of Chairman Mao Zedong's Little Red Book. The large sales that these generated have allowed the house to publish more specialized titles, particularly in the social sciences. Seuil has published works by Jacques Lacan, Roland Barthes and Philippe Sollers (in his first period), and later by Edgar Morin, Maurice Genevoix and Pierre Bourdieu. Notably, they published Frantz Fanon's doctoral thesis, Black Skin, White Masks, in 1952, and the first edition of Aleksandr Solzhenitsyn's The Gulag Archipelago (in Russian as Архипелаг ГУЛАГ) in 1973.

Similarly, Seuil's good relations with book retailers have allowed it to establish significant distribution activity, ensuring the circulation of the works of such publishers as Odile Jacob, Éditions de Minuit, José Corti, and Rivages.

Éditions du Seuil has also performed significant activities in children's literature. The house has promoted and published many great French children's authors; in 2005 Éditions du Seuil was the first to offer to the public animated films included in their albums that were produced by the artists themselves, such as À Quai by Sara and Promenade d'un distrait, by Béatrice Alemagna.

== History ==
In 1937, Éditions du Seuil was bought by Paul Flamand and Jean Bardet. In 1979 these two left the direction to Michel Chodkiewicz.

The leadership was subsequently ensured by Claude Cherki from 1989. Cherki was involved in the purchase of Seuil by La Martinière on 12 January 2004. Six months later he was obliged to resign as a result of his interest in this operation. Cherki was replaced by Pascal Flamand (Président-directeur général) and Olivier Cohen (publishing director). The latter created a subsidiary called L'Olivier. Following the purchase by La Martinière, the Volumen distribution company was created. Numerous logistical problems arose, and several editors left the publishing house.

In November 2005, Éditions du Seuil announced the arrival of Laure Adler to oversee its literature department. Olivier took back control of his publishing house L'Olivier. Points, a pocket subsidiary of Seuil, became a publisher in its own right. The house continued its policy of growth, amalgamating the publishers Danger Public and Petit à petit. Significant tension developed and in 2006 the editor Hervé Hamon (who had a loyal record of 20 publications with Seuil in the capacity of an author) left, declaring that the author was no longer at the centre of the operation.

In August 2006, the group announced a new director general, the journalist and writer Denis Jeambar, who had formerly been deputy director of editing for Point, and president of the L'Express-L'Expansion group, and editing director of L'Express. Towards the end of 2006, Laure Adler was dismissed.

== Collections ==
- The "bookstore of the 21st century" collection was created by Maurice Olender in 1989. After having created the "texts of the 20th century" collection of 19 titles at Hachette in 1985, Olender devised the "bookstore of the 20th century", which subsequently turned into the "21st century". It comprised 143 titles as of 2009. The authors who were first published by Hachette followed Olender to Seuil. The magazine Page des libraires presented the collection and its director as follows:
  To the books of Paul Celan [...], Perec, Vernant, Pastoureau, Borges, Rancière, Tabucchi, Lydia Flem, Starobinski [...] are added the works of [...] Yves Bonnefoy, Pascal Dusapin and the final novel of François Maspero.

== Book series ==
- Champ Freudien
- Combats
- Fiction et Cie
- Histoire immédiate
- Microcosme: Ecrivains de toujours
- Microcosme: Petit Planète
- Microcosme: Maîtres Spirituels
- Microcosme: Le Rayon de la Science
- Microcosme: Solfèges
- Microcosme: Le Temps qui court
- Peuple et culture
- Point Virgule
- Points

== See also ==
- Books in France

== Bibliography ==
- (in French) "Tant qu'il y aura des tomes", Les dossiers du Canard enchaîné, No. 93, October 2004.
