= Étienne Delessert =

Étienne Delessert may refer to:

- Étienne Delessert (banker) (1735–1816), French banker
- Étienne Delessert (illustrator) (1941–2024), Swiss graphic designer and illustrator
