= Svjetlan Junaković =

Croatian painter, sculptor and children's illustrator

- Born: January 23, 1961; Zagreb, Croatia
- Education: Brera Academy
- Known for: Painting, sculpture, illustration, children's books
- Notable work: Painting, sculpture, children's book illustration
- Awards: Levstik Award; 2009 100 + 1 uganka
- Website: svjetlanjunakovic.com

Svjetlan Junaković (born 23 January 1961) is a Croatian painter, sculptor and illustrator, best known for his children's picture books. He has received numerous international awards for his illustrations and has participated in exhibitions throughout Europe. For his lasting contribution as a children's illustrator, Junaković was a finalist for the biennial, international Hans Christian Andersen Award in both 2008 and 2010.

== Biography ==
Junaković was born in Zagreb in 1961. He graduated from the Brera Academy in Milan in 1985 where he specialized in sculpture. He works as a painter, sculptor, illustrator and graphic designer and is also a lecturer in illustration at the Academy of Fine Arts in Zagreb and the International School in Sarmede in Italy.

Junaković has won many international prizes. In 2001 he won prizes at the Biennial of Illustration Bratislava for Mit Pauken und Trompeten (With Bass Drums and Trumpets) and Roter Frosch, grüner Flamingo (Red Frog, Greener Flamingo). In 2009 he won the Levstik Award for his illustrations in 100 + 1 uganka (100 + 1 Riddles).

== Selected books as illustrator ==
- Roter Frosch, grüner Flamingo (Red Frog, Greener Flamingo), 1999
- Zirkus! Zirkus! (Circus! Circus!), 2002
- Kroko Kanal (Croc Canal), 2003
- Moj put (My Journey), 2007
- Velika knjiga portreta (The Great Portrait Book), 2007
- 100 + 1 uganka (100 + 1 Riddles), 2008
