= Colette Vivier =

French children's literature author

Colette Edwidge Hélène Lejeune (4 July 1898 – 9 September 1979), who wrote under the pseudonym Colette Vivier, was a French author of children’s literature. In 1972 and 1974, she was highly commended as an author of children's literature by the Hans Christian Andersen Award.

== Biography ==
Vivier was born on 4 July 1898 in the 17th arrondissement of Paris, France in a bourgeoisie household. She married an academic named Jean Duval, and was also known by the name Colette Duval-Lejeune.

Vivier frequently visited a primary school in the Parisian neighborhood of Batignolles. Inspired by the young girls from working-class families that attended the school, she based her writing off of her observations of their families. She wrote a number of novels focused on childhood, many of which were written in the style of a diary. One of her books, La Maison des Petits Bonheurs (1939), was written from the perspective a young girl writing in her diary. In 1939, the book received the Prix Jeunesse (Youth Prize).

During World War II, Vivier and her husband were active in the French Resistance. They were members of the resistance group Friends of Alain-Fournier, along with other academics Claude Aveline, Jean Cassou, Marcel Abraham, Agnès Humbert, and Simone Martin-Chauffier. The group ran covertly as a literary club, and partnered with the Groupe du musée de l'Homme to establish an underground newspaper called Résistance that was distributed in the occupied zones during the war. The newspaper stopped production after its fourth issue in 1941, when members of the resistance network began to be arrested.

In 1972 and 1974, she was chosen as a highly commended author by the jury of the Hans Christian Andersen Award.

Vivier died on 9 September 1979 in the 5th arrondissement of Paris.

== Selected works ==
- La Maison des Petits Bonheurs (The House of Small Felicities, 1939)
- Entrez dans la danse (Join the Dance, 1943)
- La maison des quatre vents (1946; English translation, The House of Four Winds, 1969)
- La grande roue (The Great Wheel, 1950)
- Rémi et le fantôm (1952; English adaptation, Rémi, 1962)
- L'étoile polaire (The Polar Star, 1953)
- La Porte ouverte (1955)
- Le Petit Théâtre (1968)
