= Květa Pacovská =

Czech artist and illustrator (1928–2023)

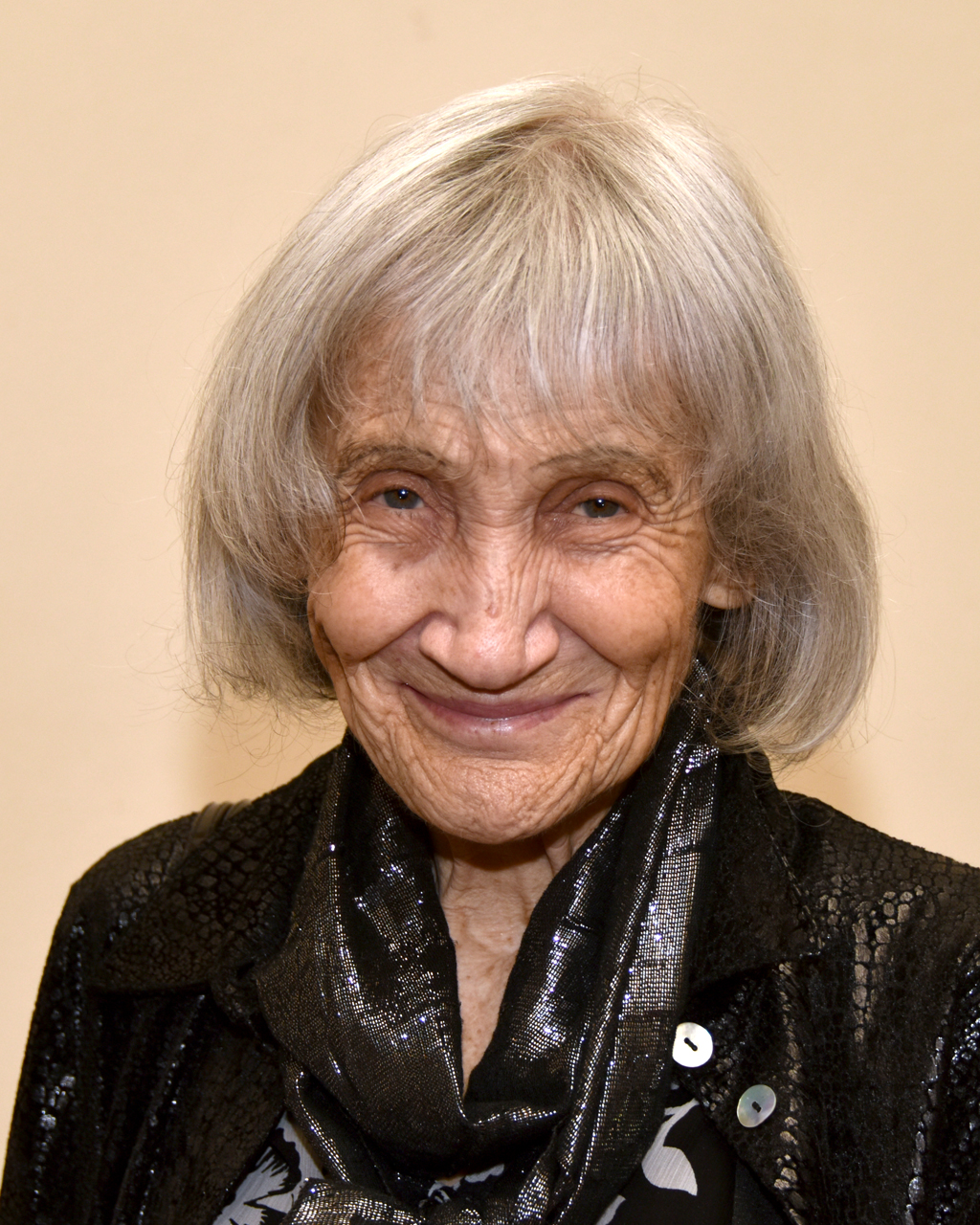
- Pacovská in 2019
- Born: Květa Pacovská; 28 July 1928; Prague, Czechoslovakia
- Died: 6 February 2023 (aged 94)
- Occupations: Illustrator, writer
- Writing career
- Genre: Children's literature
- Notable works: The Little Flower King; Unfold/Enfold
- Notable awards: Hans Christian Andersen Award for Illustration; 1992

Květa Pacovská (28 July 1928 – 6 February 2023) was a Czech illustrator and writer. She received the international Hans Christian Andersen Medal in 1992 for her "lasting contribution to children's literature".

== Life and career ==
Pacovská was born in Prague and studied at its School of Applied Arts, where she mainly worked in graphic art, arts, conceptual art and artist book fields. For many years she developed a career as a graphic designer and participated in more than 50 exhibitions. In 1961, she started drawing picture books for her own children. Her work is characterised by the use of geometric forms and vibrant colours, mainly red.

"White and black are not included in the colour spectrum but for me they are colours and mean maximum contrast. And maximum contrast is the maximum beauty. I am striving for maximum contrast. Red and green.The placing of colours one over the other. It depends on the relation, proportion, rhythm, size, amount and how we placed colours together.It is like music. Each individual tone is beautiful by itself and in certain groupings we create new dimensions, harmony, disharmony, symphonies, operas and books for children."

The biennial Hans Christian Andersen Award conferred by the International Board on Books for Young People is the highest recognition available to a writer or illustrator of children's books. Pacovská received the illustration award in 1992.

== Works ==
=== Books ===
- One, Five, Many (1990) ISBN 9780395549971 - counting book for children; as writer/illustrator
- Midnight Play (1994) ISBN 9781558582521 - as writer/illustrator
- Flying (1995) ISBN 9781558584969 - as writer/illustrator
- The Little Match Girl by Hans Christian Andersen (2005) ISBN 9780698400276 - as illustrator
- Unfold/Enfold (2005) ISBN 9782020694179 - art/picture book
- The Little Flower King (2007) ISBN 9780698400542 - as writer/illustrator
- The Sun Is Yellow (2012) ISBN 9781849760645 - as artist/illustrator
- Number Circus 1-10 and back Again (2012) ISBN 9789881915290 - counting book for children; as artist/illustrator

=== CD-ROMs ===
- Midnight Play Simon & Schuster Audio, CD-Rom edition (1999) ISBN 9780671046668
- Alphabet Tivola Electronic Publishing; CD-Rom edition (2000) ISBN 9783931372804 ASIN B000056WJY

=== Catalogues ===
- The Art of Květa Pacovská (The art of...catalogues) (1994) ISBN 9781558582330
- Open Space (2001) ISBN 9783716512517
- Pacovská Exhibition Catalog Maximum kontrast ISBN 9783865660053
