= Tatyana Mavrina =

Russian artist and illustrator (1902–1996)

Tatyana Alekseyevna Mavrina (Russian: Татьяна Алексеевна Маврина; 7 December 1902 – 19 August 1996) was a Soviet artist and children's book illustrator. In 1976, she won the Hans Christian Andersen Award, an international award given to authors and illustrators who have made substantial contributions to children's literature. Up until 2018, she was the only Russian to win the award. She also was awarded the USSR State Prize in 1975 and the title of Honored Artist of the RSFSR (Russian Soviet Federative Socialist Republic) in 1981. Her illustrations for children mainly consisted of fairy tales and were in the style of the Russian lubok.

== Life ==
Mavrina was born Tatyana Lebedev on 7 December 1900 in Nizhny Novgorod. Her parents were Anastasia (née Mavrina) and Alexey Lebedev, both teachers. Her brother was Sergey Lebedev, creator of the first Soviet computer. From 1921 to 1929, she studied at Vkhutemas in Moscow. In 1930, she took her mother's maiden name, "Mavrina."

== Death ==
She died on 19 August 1996 in Moscow, and was buried at the Novodevichy cemetery.
