= Bohumil Říha =

Czechoslovak children's book writer (1907–1987)

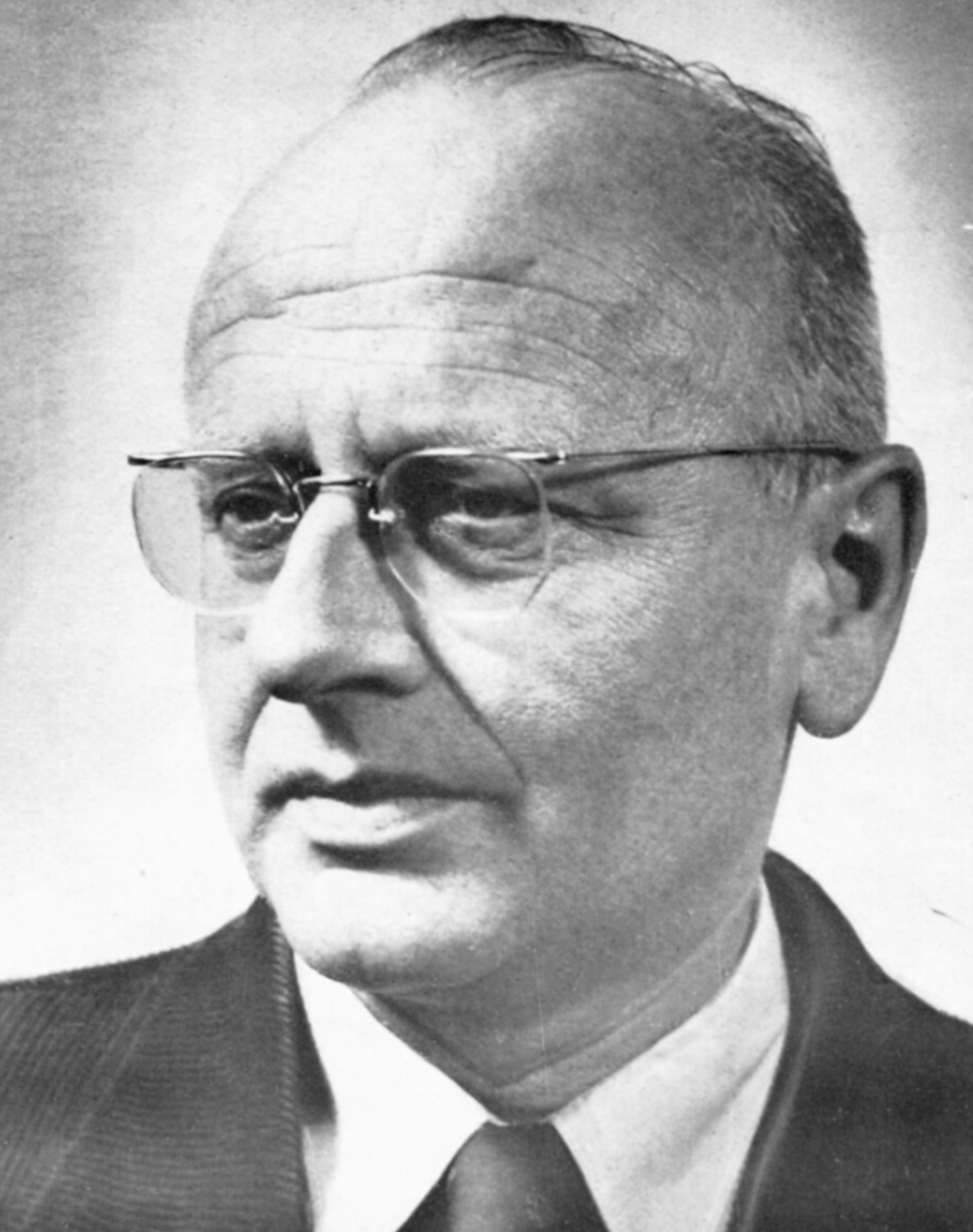
Image of Bohumil Říha

Bohumil Říha (22 February 1907 – 15 December 1987) was a Czechoslovak writer best known for children's books. For his lasting contribution to children's literature he received the Hans Christian Andersen Medal in 1980.

== Career ==
One of his most noted works is Children's Encyclopaedia (1959) that has since its publication enjoyed almost a cult following – its structure offers, besides information for beginning readers, more detailed information for children who wish to learn more about any of the subjects.

Other works include The River (1962, co-authored by Karel Friedrich), The Great Picture Book for Children (1976), The Great Animal Picture Book (1981; both together with Milena Lukešová), and Merry Tales – And What Else? (1964).

== Death and Recognition ==
He died in Prague.

The biennial Hans Christian Andersen Award conferred by the International Board on Books for Young People is the highest recognition available to a writer or illustrator of children's books. Jansson received the writing award in 1966.

== Works ==
- Čech Země dokořán, 1950
- Dvě jara, 1952
- Venkovan, 1955 – first part, 1958 – second part
- Doktor Meluzin, 1973 filmed under the title Dým bramborové natě
- Divný člověk
- O rezavém rváči a huňatém pánovi, 1971
- Trilogy about the rule of George of Poděbrady:
  - Přede mnou poklekni, 1971
  - Čekání na krále, 1977
  - A zbyl jen meč, 1978

=== Children's books ===
- O lékaři Pingovi, 1941
- O třech penízcích, 1941
- Honzíkova cesta, 1954
- O letadélku Káněti, 1957
- Pět bohů táhne přes moře
- Jak vodníci udobřili sumce
- Dva kluci v palbě
- Velká obrázková knížka pro malé děti, 1959, co author M. Lukešová
- Divoký koník Ryn
- Jak jel Vítek do Prahy
- Dětská encyklopedie, illustrations Vladimír Fuka; 1959, 1962, 1966, 1971
