= Albertine Zullo =

Swiss illustrator (born 1967)

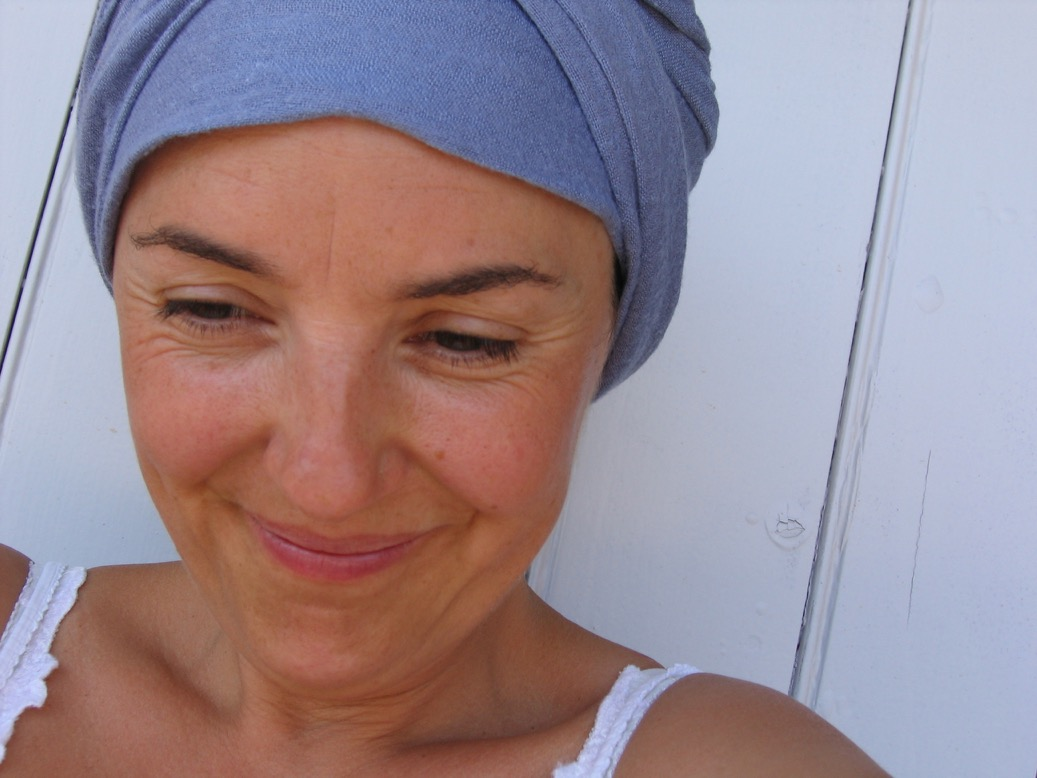
Albertine Zullo in 2016

Albertine Zullo (born 1967), known simply as Albertine, is a Swiss illustrator. She specializes in illustrating children's books, many of which have been published in English. Since 1996, she has taught screen printing at the Geneva University of Art and Design (HEAD). Zullo was awarded the Hans Christian Andersen Award for illustrator in 2020.

== Biography ==
Born on 1 December 1967 in Dardagny in the Swiss Canton of Geneva. She attended the Ecole des Arts Décoratifs in Geneva, and the Ecole Supérieure d’Art Visuel de Genève (ESAV), graduating in 1990. She immediately opened a screen printing studio. Starting in 1991, she provided illustrations for various newspapers including Le Nouveau Quotidien, L'Hebdo and Le Temps.

In 1993, she met the writer Germano Zullo. After their marriage in 1996, they collaborated closely, publishing numerous books and receiving several awards. These included the Golden Apple in the Biennial of Illustration in Bratislava (1999) and the Prix suisse Jeunesse et Médias (2009). Albertine has also exhibited her work in Geneva, Lausanne, Paris, Rome and Tokyo.

In 2020 Albertine won the Hans Christian Andersen Award for illustration.

== Selected publications ==
- Zullo, Germano; Albertine (2002). Marta and the Bicycle. Kane/Miller. ISBN 978-1-929132-35-5. (won the Bratislava Golden Apple as Marta et la bicyclette in 1999)
- Zullo, Germano; Albertine (2012). Little Bird. Enchanted Lion Books. ISBN 978-1-59270-118-6. (originally published as Les oiseaux by La Joie de Lire in 2010)
- Zullo, Germano; Albertine (2012). Sky High. Chronicle Books. ISBN 978-1-4521-1392-0. (originally published as Les gratte-ciel by La Joie de Lire in 2010
- Zullo, Germano; Albertine (2013). Line 135. Chronicle Books. ISBN 978-1-4521-2729-3. (originally published as Ligne 135 by La Joei de Lire in 2012)
- Zullo, Germano; Albertine (2014). Jumping Jack. Chronicle Books. ISBN 978-1-4521-3672-1. (originally published as Dada by La Joie de Lire in 2013)
