= Roger Mello =

Brazilian children's book illustrator (born 1965)

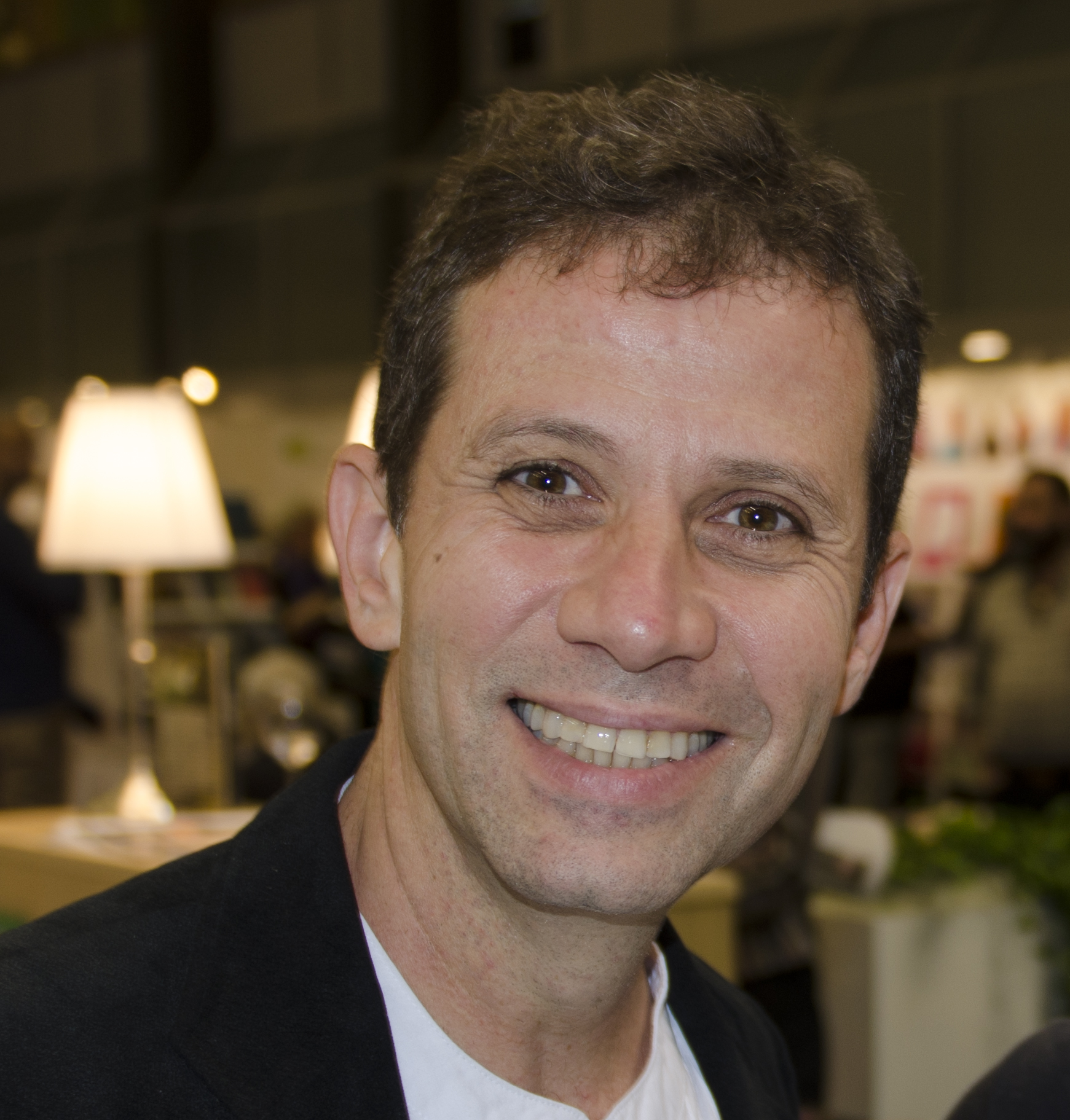
Roger Mello at the Gothenburg Book Fair 2014

Roger Mello (born 20 November 1965) is a Brazilian children's book illustrator. He was the first illustrator from Latin America to win the Hans Christian Andersen Award, which he did in 2014.

== Honours and awards ==
- 2002 Espace-Enfants
- 2002 Prêmio Jabuti
- 2014 Hans Christian Andersen Award

== Publications ==
- (with Daniel Hahn) Charcoal Boys (Elsewhere Editions, 2019)
- (with Daniel Hahn) You can't be too careful! (Elsewhere Editions, 2017)
- (with Cao Wenxuan, tr. Chloe Garcia Roberts) Feather (Archipelago Books, 2017)
- Meninos do mangue (Companhia das Letrinhas, 2012)
