= Letters on the Elements of Botany =

Letters by Jean-Jacques Rousseau

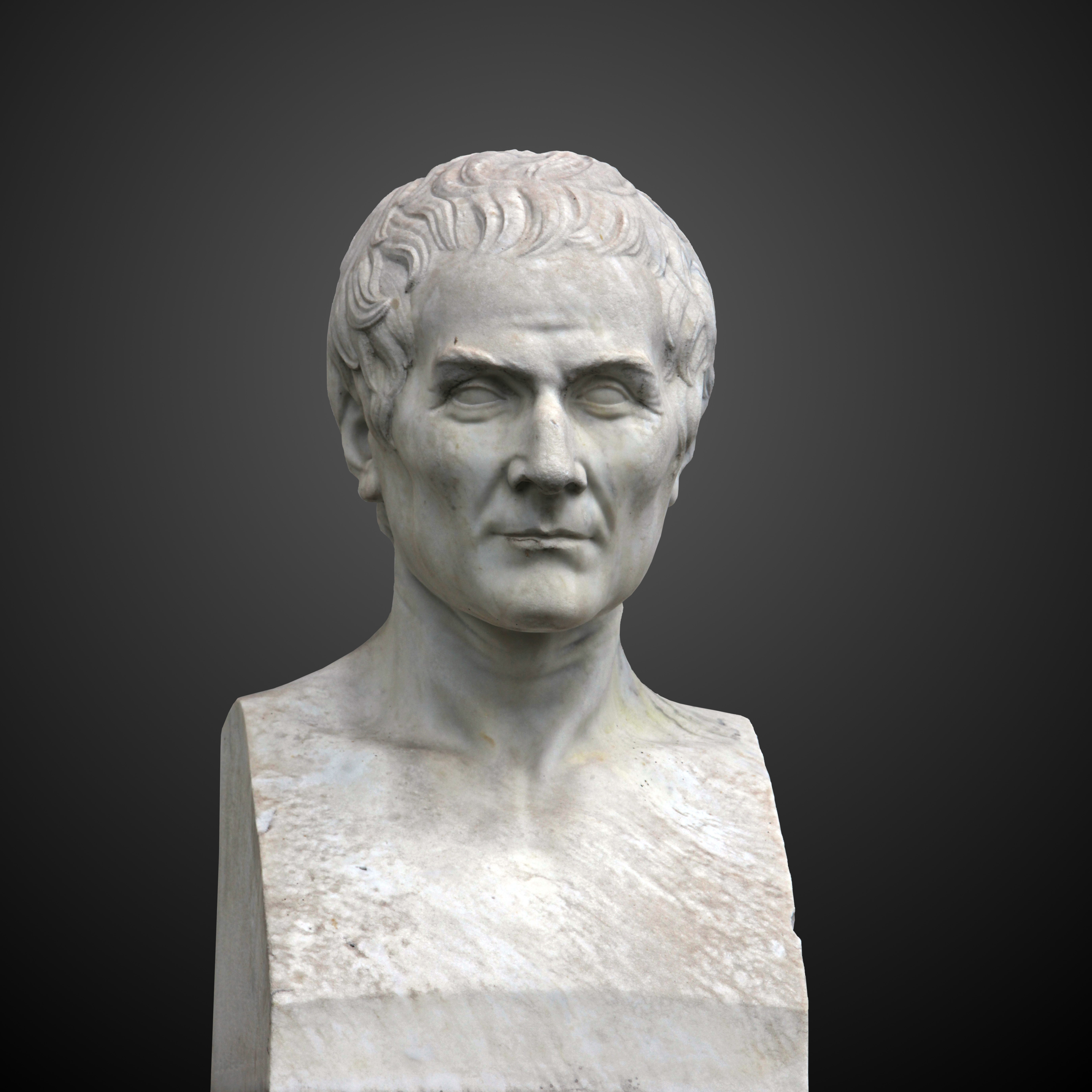
Copy of the bust of Rousseau by James Pradier, put on display on the grounds of the Geneva Botanical Garden by Candolle in recognition for his contributions to Botany

Letters on the Elements of Botany (French: Lettres Elementaires Sur La Botanique) is a work comprising a series of letters written by Jean-Jacques Rousseau on the subject of botany. They were addressed to Mme Delessert (wife of Étienne Delessert) in Lyon with the objective of helping her daughters learn botany. They were subsequently translated into English by Thomas Martyn, a professor of botany at the University of Cambridge, who added notes and corrections to the text. Martyn's translation was originally published in 1785.

== Content and reception ==
The letters elucidate the structure of plants and give their order in the Linnaean system. Rousseau avoided using Latin names so as to make the scientific content in his letters more accessible. The girls' tutor, Pierre Prévost, was highly appreciative of the letters, and commented: "Never has a botanist carried so far the delicacy and correctness with which he arranged the plants on paper...His book of mosses, in duodecimo format, was a little masterpiece of elegance." The letters remained unpublished at Rousseau's death; when they were finally published they received widespread acclaim. "It's a true pedagogical model, and it complements Emile," commented Goethe. According to Martyn, the letters were not meant for reading while sitting in an easy chair; rather they were directed at readers with a plant in their hand.
