= Thomas Martyn =

British botanist (1735–1825)

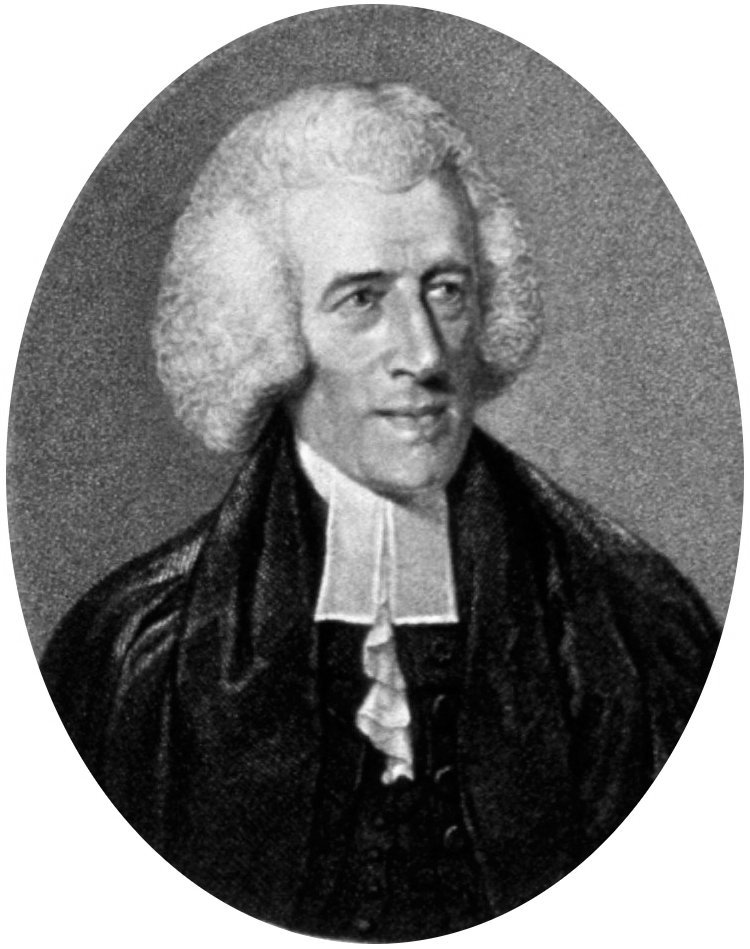
- Born: 23 September 1735
- Died: 3 June 1825 (aged 89)
- Education: Emmanuel College, Cambridge,
- Known for: Plantæ Cantabrigiensis and Flora Rustica
- Father: John Martyn
- Scientific career
- Fields: Botany
- Institutions: Cambridge University
- Author abbrev. (botany): Martyn

Thomas Martyn (23 September 1735 – 3 June 1825) was an English botanist and Professor of Botany at Cambridge University. He is sometimes confused with the conchologist and entomologist of the same name. The standard author abbreviation Martyn is used to indicate this person as the author when citing a botanical name.

== Life ==
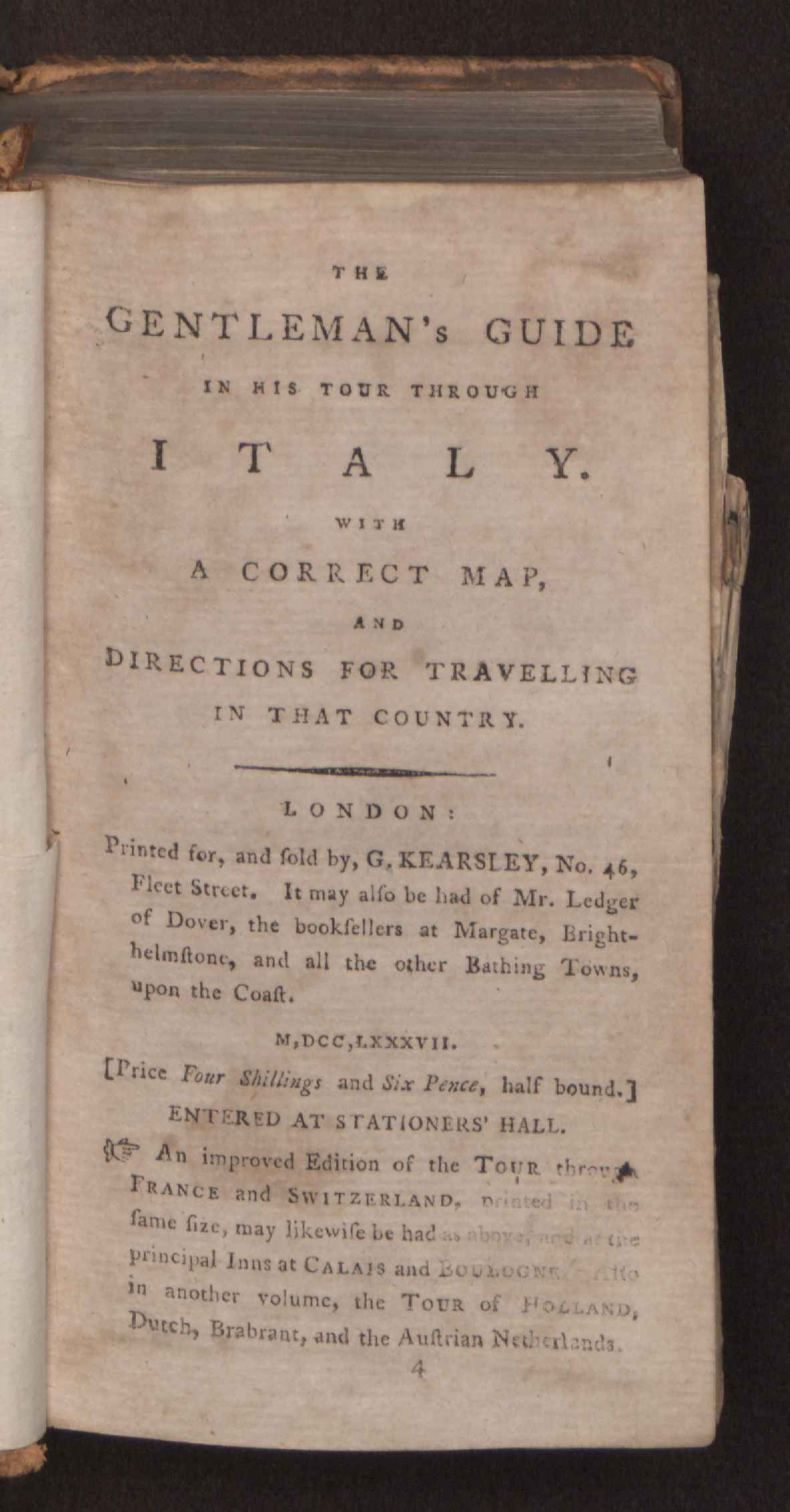
Gentleman's guide in his tour through Italy, 1787

Thomas Martyn was the son of the botanist John Martyn (1699–1768). He was educated in Chelsea and at Emmanuel College, Cambridge, graduating BA in 1756 and becoming a fellow of Sidney Sussex College and being ordained deacon in 1758. In 1759 he became MA and priest. In 1762 he succeeded his father as Professor of Botany at the University, and held the post until his death in 1825, though he only lectured until 1796 'as the subject was not popular'. Thomas Martyn's professorship at Cambridge lasted for 63 years, while his father had held the same post for 29 years. Thomas Martyn was elected a Fellow of the Royal Society in 1786.

== Works ==
Two of Martyn's major works are Plantæ Cantabrigiensis (1763) and Flora Rustica, 4 vols. (1792–1794). He translated the Lettres sur la botanique of Rousseau. In 1788 he published Thirty-eight Plates with Explanations, illustrating the plant system devised by Linnaeus As a priest in the Anglican church Thomas Martyn preached until he was 82 years old; in 1830 George Cornelius Gorham, his curate, published a dual biography consisting of additions to Martyn's memoir of his father and Martyn's autobiographical memoir (Memoirs of John Martyn, F.R.S., and of Thomas Martyn, B.D., F.R.S, F.L.S., Professors of Botany in the University of Cambridge, London, Hatchard & Son). Thomas Martyn's other written works include: The English Connoisseur (1766); The Gentleman's Guide in his Tour through Italy (1787) and The Language of Botany (1793). His book in 1807, The Gardeners' and Botanists' Dictionary, improved and expanded Philip Miller's 1731 book The Gardeners Dictionary.

== Publications ==
- Thomas Martyn, Some account of the late John Martyn, F.R.S., and his writings. London: 1770. An expanded version of this memoir was prepared and published by George Gorham in 1830.

For a full list, see Gorham p. 267

== Bibliography ==
- Gorham, George Cornelius (1830). Memoirs of John Martyn and of Thomas Martyn. Professors of Botany in the University of Cambridge. Hatchard and son.
