= Doktor Meluzin =

1973 Czech novel by Bohumil Říha

First edition

Doktor Meluzin is a Czech novel by Bohumil Říha. It was first published in 1973. It was adapted into the 1977 film Smoke on the Potato Fields.
