= Lee Geum-yi =

South Korean of Young Adult Fiction

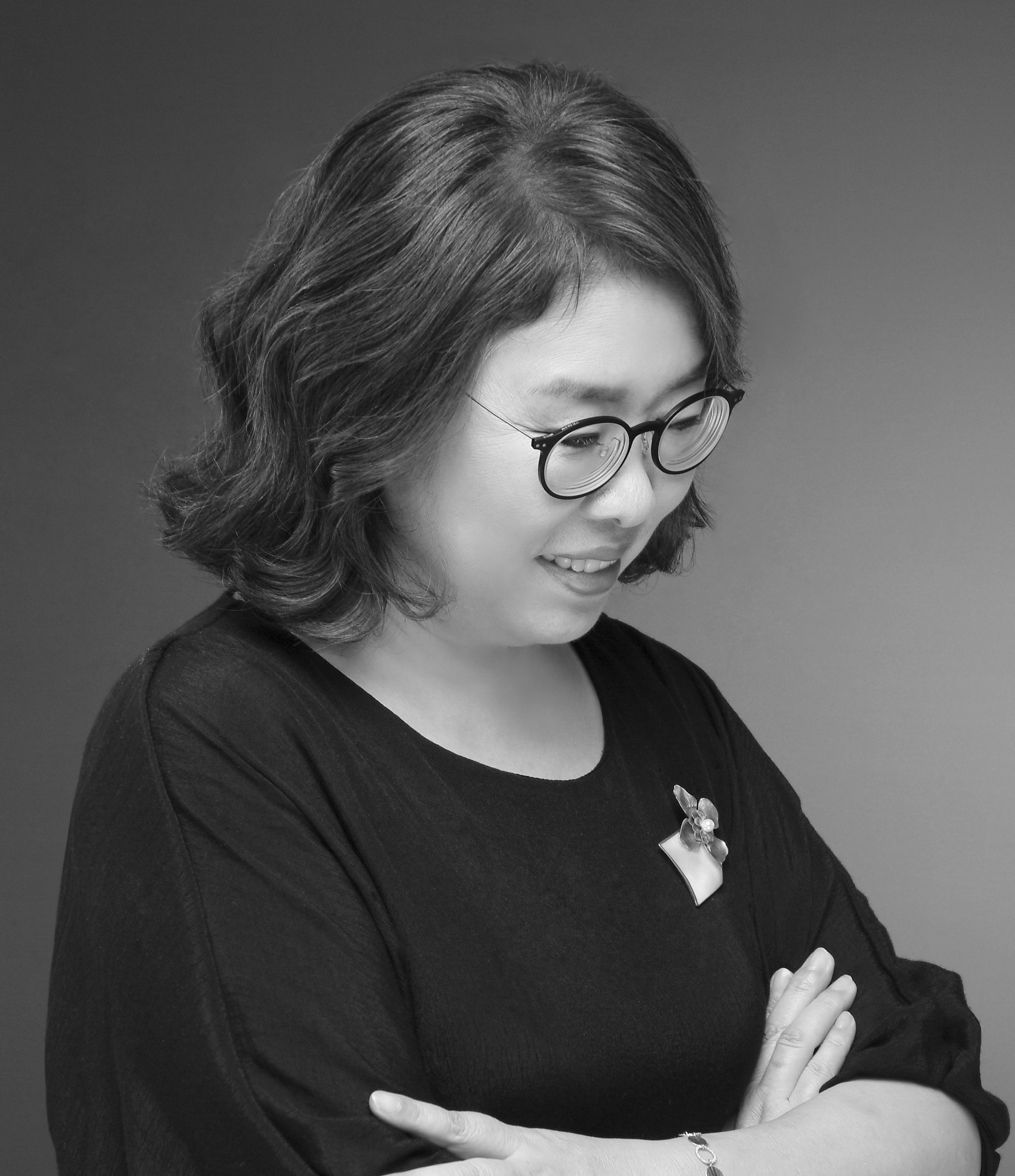
- Born: Cheongwon, South Korea
- Occupation: Writer
- Writing career
- Language: Korean
- Genres: Young adult fiction, children's fiction

Lee Geum-yi (Korean: 이금이) is a Korean author of children's and young adult literature. Since her debut in 1984, she has written more than fifty literary works. In the early days of her career, she mainly wrote children's stories set in rural areas including Keundori in Bamtee Village, leading her to earn the nickname “the writer of agricultural villages.” Lee's works often explore Korean society and issues involving minorities including women and the disabled. Since the release of her first young adult novel Yujin and Yujin in 2004, Lee has incorporated the lives of teenagers and the varied social and psychological issues they face into her work. Her historical novels Can’t I Go Instead? and The Picture Bride, are works of young adult fiction. In 2018, she was selected for the IBBY Honour List for Can’t I Go Instead? She was nominated for the Hans Christian Andersen Award in both 2020 and 2024.

== Career ==
Lee Geum-yi made her official debut as an author in 1984 with Younggu and Heukgu In 2018, she was selected for the IBBY Honour List for Can’t I Go Instead?. In 2020, she was selected as the Korean nominee for the Hans Christian Andersen Award.The Picture Bride , which was published in 2020, is her first novel to be published in English. The Picture Bride and Yujin and Yujin (published in 2004) have been adapted into musicals.

== Awards ==
- 2024, 2020 Korean nominee for the Hans Christian Andersen Award
- 2018 IBBY Honour List - Can’t I Go Instead?
- 2017 Bang Jeong-hwan Literary Award - One Night

== Adaptations ==
- 2022 Musical <Aloha, My Moms〉 (Based upon The Picture Bride)
- 2021 Webtoon 〈Can't I Go Instead?〉 (Based upon the same title)
- 2021 Musical 〈Yujin and Yujin〉 (Based upon the same title)
- 2021 Theater Play 〈Yujin and Yujin〉 (Based upon the same title)
- 2013 Short Animation for Improving Awareness of the Disabled (Based upon Just Different from Me)
- 2002 EBS Children Literature in TV Drama: Just Different from Me
- 2001 KBS TV Drama - Keundori in Bamtee Village

== Works ==
=== Young adult novels ===
- 2020The Picture Bride (Changbi Publishers) ISBN 978-89-364-6576-6
  - 2022 (Forge Books/Macmillan, USA) (trans. An Seonjae) ISBN 978-12-508-0866-0
  - 2022 (Scribe Publications, Australia) (trans. An Seonjae) ISBN 978-19-223-1085-9
- 2019 Life traveler (Munhakdongne Publishing)
- 2016 Can’t I Go Instead? (Sakyejul Publishing) ISBN 979-11-6094-842-4
  - 2023 (Forge Books/Macmillan, USA) (trans. An Seonjae)
  - 2022 (そこに私が行ってもいいですか?, 里山社, Japan) (trans. 神谷丹路)
- 2014 Youth Stories (Sakyejul Publishing)
- 2014 Searching For the Hidden Path (Prooni Publishing) ISBN 979-11-91826-03-6
  - 2021 (rev.) (Bamtee Publishing)
- 2013 The Moment Ice Sparkles (Prooni Publishing) ISBN 979-11-91826-23-4
- 2121 Us, In the Land of the Giants (Prooni Publishing)
  - 2022 (Bamtee Publishing) ISBN 979-11-91826-05-0
- 2013 So-hee’s Room (Prooni Publishing)
  - 2021 (Bamtee Publishing) ISBN 979-11-91826-02-9
- 2010 A Marionette’s Dance (Prooni Publishing)
  - 2022 (Bamtee Publishing) ISBN 979-11-91826-19-7
- 2009 Goodbye, My First Love (Prooni Publishing)
  - 2021 (Bamtee Publishing) ISBN 979-11-91826-04-3
- 2008 Cliff (Prooni Publishing) ISBN 979-11-91826-22-7
- 2008 The Whale in My Pocket (Prooni Publishing)
  - 2021 (Bamtee Publishing) ISBN 979-11-971205-5-8
- 2004 Yujin and Yujin (Prooni Publishing)
  - 2020 (Bamtee Publishing) ISBN 979-11-97120-54-1
  - 2023 (有真与有真 Beijing Yuchen Culture, China)
  - 2011 (Yujin et Yujin Picquier, France) ISBN 978-2809702590
- 1999 You Too Are a Twilight Lily (Prooni Publishing)
  - 2021 (Bamtee Publishing, 2021) ISBN 978-89-5798-102-3

=== Children's fiction ===
- 2012 Pet Food for You (Prooni Publishing) ISBN 9788957983041
- 2006 Foster Care (Prooni Publishing)
  - 2021 (Bamtee Publishing)
- 2004 A Very Tiny School (Prooni Publishing) ISBN 9788957980071
- 2003 Mito’s Poop Is Cute Too (Prooni Publishing) ISBN 9788957981320
- 2002 Handy Boy (Prooni Publishing) ISBN 9788957980712
- 2002 Jaedeok My Friend (Prooni Publishing) ISBN 9788957980873
- 2000 Mother Earth (Prooni Publishing) ISBN 9788988578346
- 2000 Just Different from Me (Prooni Publishing) ISBN 9788957980705
- 2000 The Country of My Mother (Prooni Publishing) ISBN 9788957980583
- 1999 A Rat Called Hamster (Prooni Publishing) ISBN 9788957980637
- 1999 Kkebi from Dodeulmaru (Sigongsa Publishing) ISBN 9788957980637
- 1996 My Teeth on the Roof (Doosan Donga Publishing) ISBN 9788900051285
  - 2001 (Prooni Publishing) ISBN 9788957980538
- 1996 Sand Pebble School (Daekyo Publishing) ISBN 9788939507401
  - 2002 (Prooni Publishing) ISBN 9788988578797
- 1996 Barefooted Children (Hyeonamsa Publishing)
  - 2007(Prooni Publishing) ISBN 9788957981290
- 1994 Bamtee Village Series
  - 1994 Keundori in Bamtee Village (Daekyo Publishing)| 2004 (Prooni Publishing) ISBN 978-89-5798-001-9
  - 2000 Yeongmi in Bamtee Village (Prooni Publishing) ISBN 89-5798-002-4
  - 2005 Bomi in Bamtee Village (Prooni Publishing) ISBN 978-89-5798-003-3
- 1994 Children at Solmoru Ranch (Donga Publishing) ISBN 9788900033755
- 1991 Younggu and Heukgu (Hyeonamsa Publishing)
  - 2002 (Prooni Publishing) ISBN ISBN 89-88578-56-2
- 1988 The Flower-Scented Wind (Daekyo Publishing)
  - 1999, 2007 (Prooni Publishing) ISBN 9788957981085
- 1987 Be the Bridge (Kyemongsa Publishing) ISBN 9788957982846
  - 2005 (Prooni Publishing)

=== Early reader books ===
- 2021 Looking for Cha Daegi (Sakyejul Publishing) ISBN 9791160947304
- 2019 They Called My Name (Suntree Books) ISBN 9788962681840
- 2019 Like the Rowdy Princess (Sakyejul Publishing) ISBN 9791160944570
  - 2022 A Princesa indomável (Atalante Editores Ltda./Casa Oito, Brazil)
- 2016 One Night (Sakyejul Publishing) ISBN 9788958284468
- 2011 The Granny Riding a Tiger (Prooni Publishing) ISBN 9788961702072
- 2010 Hate It, Don’t Know It, Just Because (Prooni Publishing) ISBN 9788961701068
  - 2022 (Bamtee Publishing) ISBN 9791191826081
- 2009 Not the Way I Want (Prooni Publishing)
  - 2022 (Bamtee Publishing)
- 2008 Secret Helper at Our House (Prooni Publishing) ISBN 9788961700641
- 2008 My Teacher Hates Me (Prooni Publishing) ISBN 9788961700405
  - 2022 (Bamtee Publishing) ISBN 9791191826067
- 2007 Popsicles and Water Skiing (Prooni Publishing) ISBN 9788957980972
- 2005 Twelve Animals in the Tripitaka Koreana (Prooni Publishing) ISBN 9788990794147
- 2002 I’m Right, It’s a Whale! (Prooni Publishing) ISBN 9788988578544
- 2002, 2007 Pruni and Gouni (Prooni Publishing) ISBN 9788990794697
- 2001 Kimchi Is Kimchi Even in English (Prooni Publishing) ISBN 9788957980392
- 1991 Betting Your Calf (Junghan Publishing)
  - 2008 (Prooni Publishing) ISBN 9788961700306

=== Other titles ===
- 2012 Fermata Italy (Sakyejul Publishing) ISBN 9791160947564
- 2006, 2011 Lee Geum-yi’s Children’s Book Creative Class (Prooni Publishing)
