= Iwona Chmielewska =

Polish writer and illustrator

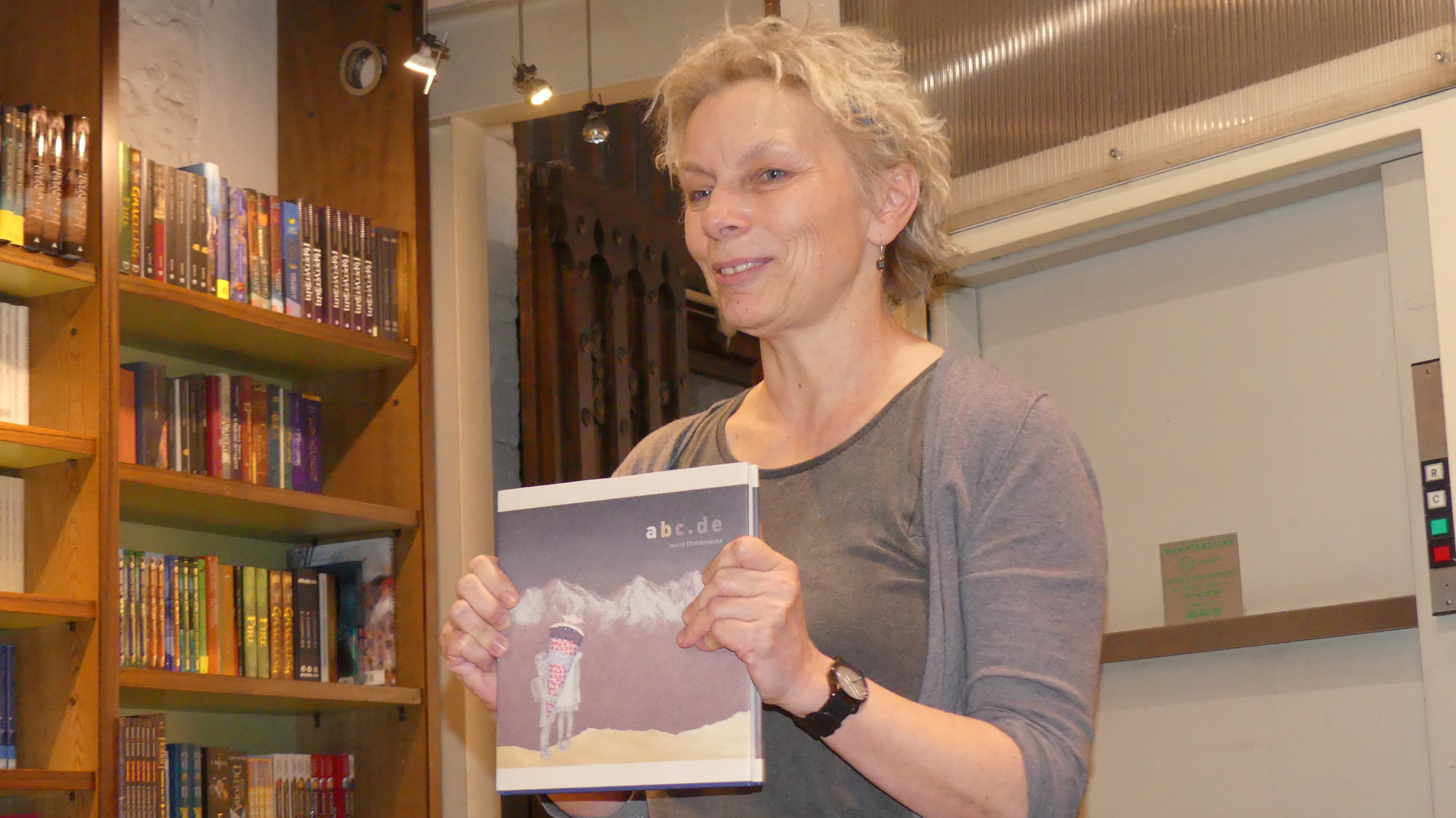
Iwona Chmielswska (2016)

Iwona Chmielewska (born 1960) is a Polish author and illustrator, who publishes mainly for children but also for adults. Many of her works are published in South Korea where she has gained considerable popularity. She lives and works in Toruń in northern Poland where she teaches in the Faculty of Fine Arts at the Nicolaus Copernicus University.

== Biography ==
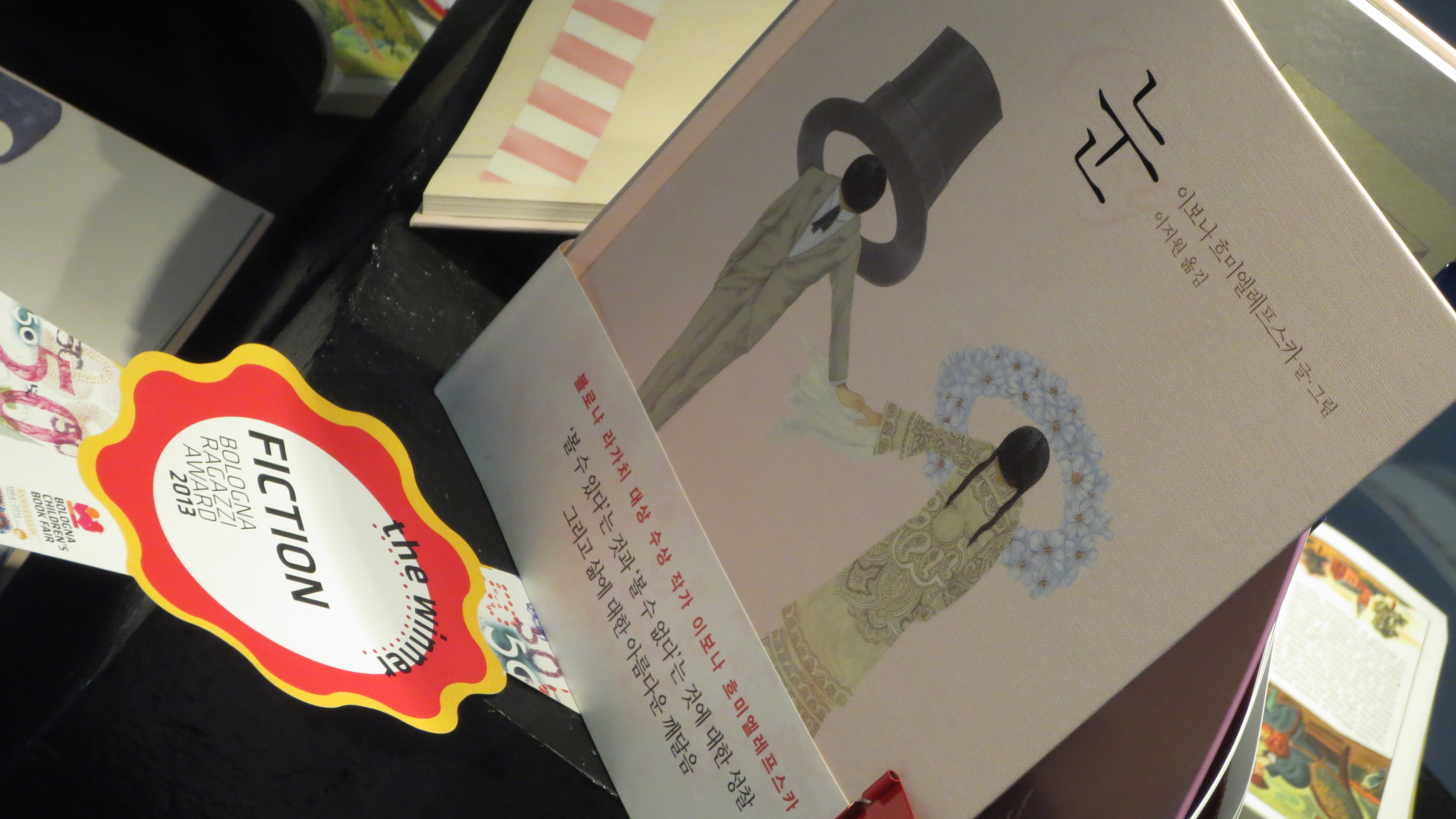
Bologna Prize 2015

Born on 5 February 1960 in Pabianice, Chmielewska studied graphic design at the Nicolaus Copernicus University in Toruń. She first published in South Korea in 1990 where she has now published over 20 books, many of which have been translated into other languages.

Chmielswska has received major awards including the Bologna Ragazzi from the Bologna Children's Book Fair (2011 and 2013) and the Golden Apple at the Biennial of Illustration in Bratislava (2007).

== Selected publications ==
- 2005: Thinking ABC, utgitt av Nonjang, Seoul, South Korea
- 2006: O wędrowaniu przy zasypianiu, utgitt av Hokus-Pokus, Warsaw
- 2009: Kwak Young Kwon: Room in the Heart, BIUM, published by Agibooks, Seoul
- 2010: Kim Hee-Kyung: The House of the Mind – MAUM, published by Changbi, Paju-si, South Korea
- 2011: Blumkas Tagebuch - Vom Leben in Janusz Korczaks Waisenhaus, utgitt av Gimpel, Hannover
- 2013: Eyes, published by Changbi, Paju-si
