= Benjamin Delessert =

French banker and naturalist (1773–1847)

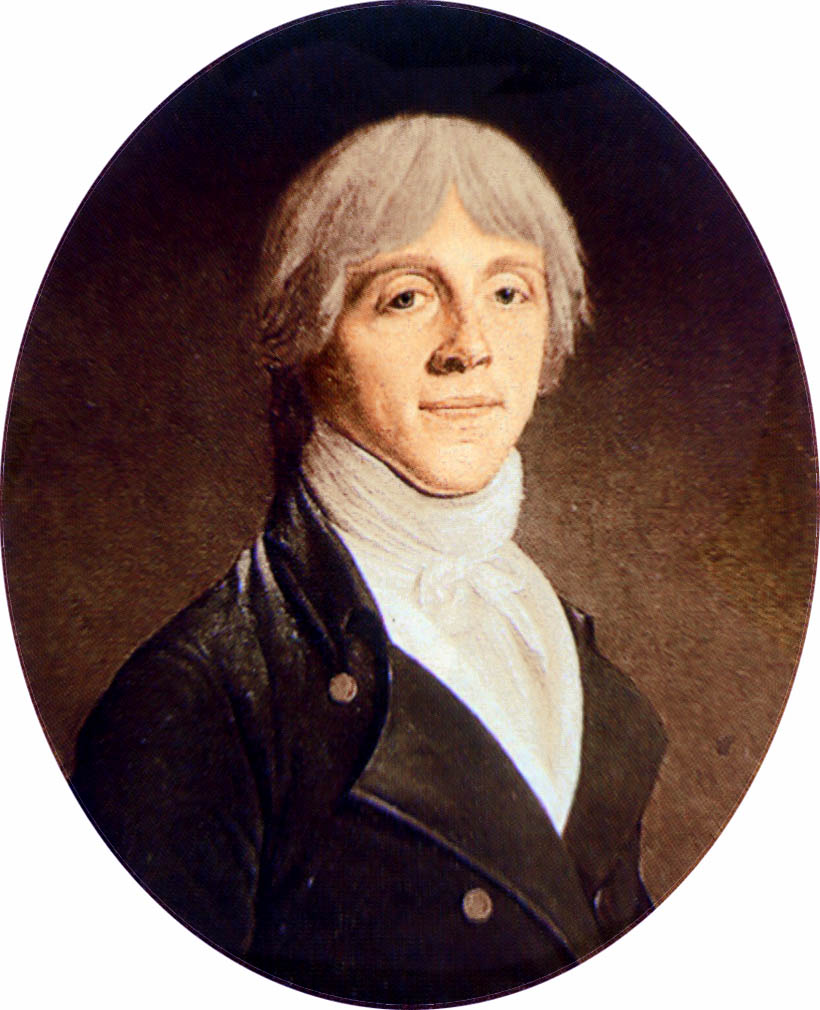
Benjamin Delessert circa 1800

Jules Paul Benjamin Delessert (14 February 1773 – 1 March 1847) was a French banker and naturalist with Swiss family origins who was educated at the University of Edinburgh. He was an honorary member of the Académie des Sciences and many species were named from his massive botanical and other natural history collections made mainly through the acquisitions of the collections of others. He had several employees to curate and study his natural history collections apart from collaborating with scientists like Augustin de Candolle. His nephew Adolphe François Delessert collected widely in Asia for him.

== Biography ==
Benjamin was born at Lyon, the son of Étienne Delessert (1735–1816), the founder of the first fire insurance company and the first discount bank in France. Their Huguenot ancestors had moved from France to Switzerland in the sixteenth century due to religious persecution and had moved back after 1685. His mother, Madeleine Delessert, née Boy de la Tour, had an interest in botany and owned Rousseau's Lettres elementaires sur la botanique (1781). A sister of Benjamin, Marguerite, was introduced to plants at an early age and Rousseau wanted to encourage her education. Delessert's first herbarium was one that had been prepared by Rousseau for Marguerite. In 1784 young Benjamin and his brother Jacques-Etienne (“Stephen”) went to study at the University of Edinburgh. They attended the lectures of John Walker (1731–1803). He became acquainted with James Hutton (1726–1797), Adam Smith (1723–1790), James Watt (1736–1819) and Dugald Stewart (1753–1828). The Swiss geologist Jean Andre Deluc (1727–1817) was an intermediary in many of their intellectual connections. They were travelling on their grand tour in England when the French Revolution broke out, but Benjamin hastened back to join the Paris National Guard in 1789, becoming an officer of artillery in 1793 after training in Meulan. He saw action in Belgium and the Netherlands serving under Jean-Charles Pichegru. An older brother, who was helping his father manage their bank, died and this forced Benjamin to quit the army and help his father, and in 1795 took up the position of director at the bank, a position he held for the next fifty two years.

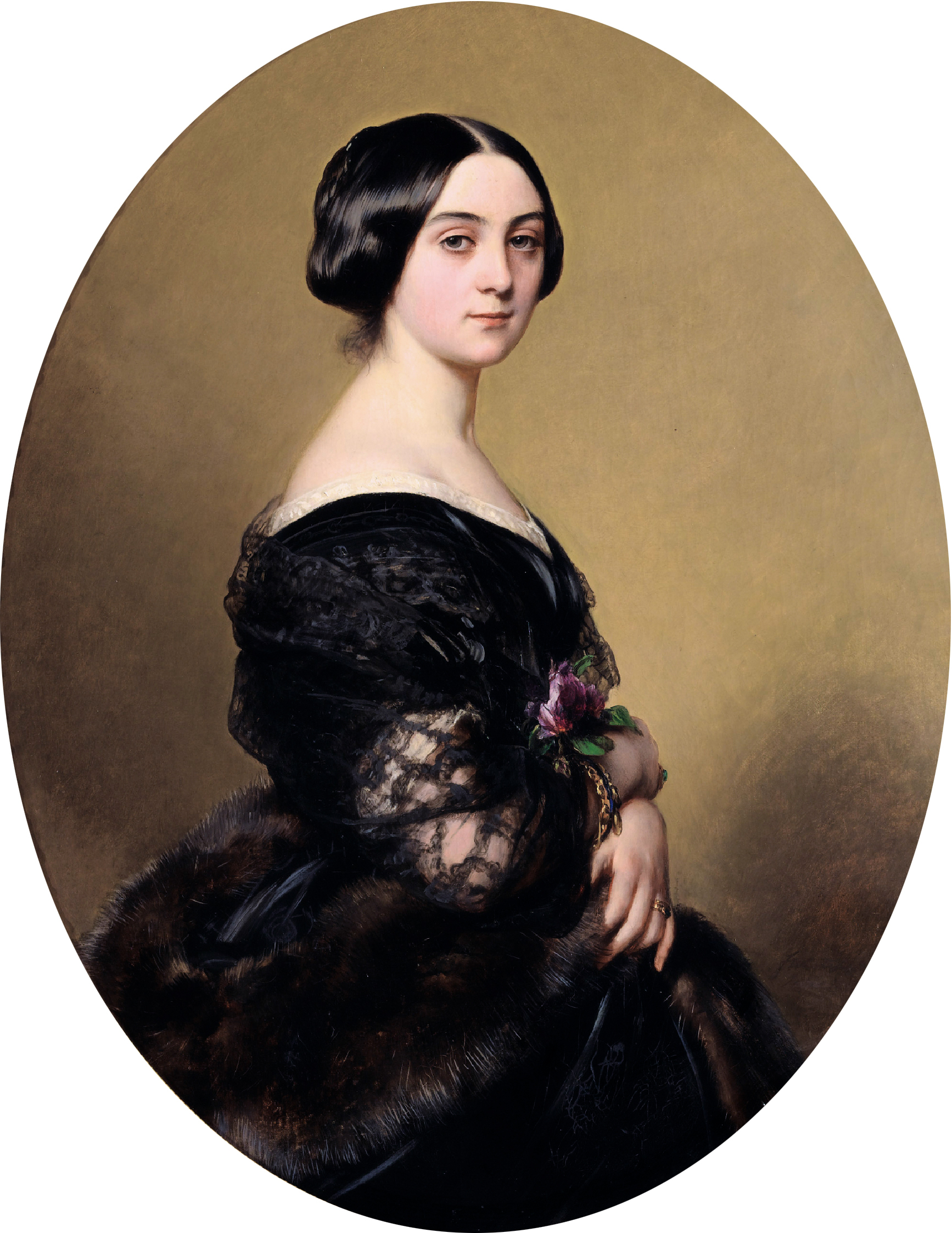
Niece Caroline Hottinguer painted by Franz Xaver Winterhalter,1851

An entrepreneur, he started many commercial enterprises, founding the first cotton factory at Passy in 1801, and a sugar factory in 1802 where Jean-Baptiste Quéruel developed the industrial manufacture of sugar from sugar beet, and for which he was created a baron of the Empire. Napoleon himself visited the refinery in 1812 and Delessert was made a Légion d'honneur. He sat in the chamber of deputies for many years from 1815, and was a strong advocate for many humane measures, notably the suppression of the tour d'abandon or revolving box at the foundling hospital, the suppression of the death penalty, and the improvement of the penitentiary system. He was made regent of the Bank of France in 1802, and was also member of, and, indeed, founder of many, learned and philanthropic societies. He began to distribute Rumford's Soup to the poor in Paris. He also set up the Societe Philanthropique, with the aim of providing nursing, maternity home, insurance, education, and medical treatment. In 1818 he founded with Jean-Conrad Hottinger the first savings bank in France, the Groupe Caisse d'Epargne and maintained a keen interest in it until his death in 1847.

Benjamin married a cousin Laure Delessert (1772–1823) in 1807 and they had no children. His brother François Marie Delessert (1780–1868) had one daughter, Caroline Delessert who married Baron Jean-Henri Hottinguer in 1858. A boulevard in the XVIth arrondissement and a road in the Xth arrondissement are named after Delessert. He died in Paris and a simple funeral was held according to his request, without any speeches or ceremony. The money saved was to be given to the poor of Paris. He is buried in Rue Lekain.

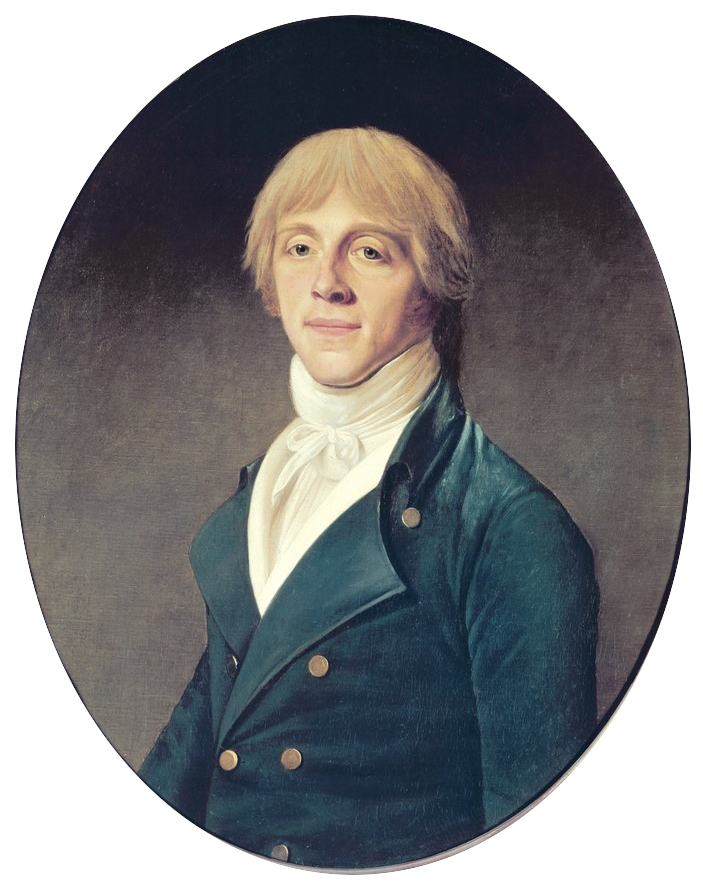
c. 1790

== Botany and natural history ==
Delessert became an ardent collector of natural history. He had a keen interest in botany and conchology. Following the death of his wife, Delessert made the collections available for botanists from across Europe to visit them at the hôtel Delessert. His brother Etienne had started a herbarium in 1788 and to this he added the Burman herbarium in 1810, the herbarium of Luis-Guillaume Lemonnier (1717–1799) in 1803, the Ventenat herbarium in 1809, and the Palisot de Beauvois collection in 1820. He appointed Achille Richard (1794–1852) and in 1820 Antoine Guillemin (1796–1842) to manage these collections and to study them. Richard left in 1827 to the Paris natural history museum but continued to help Delessert. He also had Antonine Lasegue manage his library in 1830. In 1845, his botanical library contained 30,000 volumes, of which he published a catalogue Musée botanique de M. Delessert (1845). He also wrote Des avantages de la caisse d'épargne et de prévoyance (1835), Mémoire sur un projet de bibliothèque royale (1836), Le Guide de bonheur (1839), and Recueil de coquilles décrites par Lamarck (1841–42). His major botanical collaborators were Augustin Pyramus de Candolle and Pedro Cláudio Dinamarquez Clausen. He was honoured in 1813, when botanist Jean Vincent Félix Lamouroux published Delesseria, which is a genus of red algae belonging to the family Delesseriaceae. Samuel Perrottet and his nephew Adolphe Delessert collected specimens for him from 1834 from India.

His mollusc collection grew with the acquisitions of Dufresne (1833), Lamarck (1840) and Feissier (1842) and made up nearly 150,000 specimens. This was managed by Jean Charles Chenu (1808–1879). He also collected art works by European masters. In his will, he left his collections to his brothers François and Gabriel, requesting them to maintain it and allow its use for science. His botanical library finally went to the Institut de France.
