= Lygia Bojunga Nunes =

Brazilian writer of children's books (born 1932)

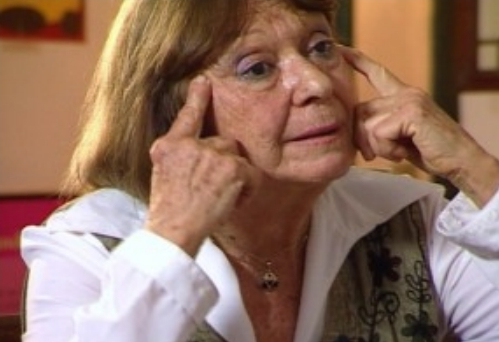
Lygia Bojunga Nunes

Lygia Bojunga (born 26 August 1932, in Pelotas, Rio Grande do Sul) is a Brazilian writer of children's books under the name Lygia Bojunga Nunes. She is one of four people to win the two major international awards: for "lasting contribution to children's literature", she received the Hans Christian Andersen Medal in 1982. For her career contribution to "children's and young adult literature in the broadest sense" she won the Astrid Lindgren Memorial Award in 2004.

A major element of her books is the usage of the child's point of view.

Lygia Bojunga is part of the tradition of magical realism and fantasy-filled storytelling of South America. In her word-of-mouth style narratives, characterised by a strongly dramatic presence, anything can happen. She fuses playfulness, poetic beauty and absurd humour with social critique, a love of freedom and a strong empathy with the vulnerable child. Fantasy often functions as a way of dealing with distressing personal experiences, or as an escape from harsh reality. Bojunga enables the reader to enter directly into the dreams of her principal characters and to share in their experiences.

== Life ==
Bojunga was born in Pelotas, Rio Grande do Sul, Brazil in 1932. She worked on TV and radio until her first book was published in 1972. Having begun her career as an actress (she has also written a number of plays), she published her first children's book, Os Colegas, in 1972 (The Companions, 1989). Here, as in Angélica (1975), the main characters are animals endowed with human characteristics, a device that highlights the comic elements in the narrative. These early works already reveal a psychological focus: Angélica is about a pig that wants to be a swallow, but gradually learns to accept its own identity. A Bolsa Amarela (1976), highlights a similar theme, this time with a young girl in the leading role, whereas A Casa da Madrinha (1978) presents the utopian dreams and fantasies of an abandoned street child. Two of her books deal with mourning and grief: her masterpiece, Corda Bamba (1979), is about a young girl who manages to come to terms with the death of her parents through her fantasies, and in O Meu Amigo Pintor, 1987 (My Friend the Painter, 1991), a young boy reflects on the inexplicable suicide of an adult friend.

In books such as Seis Vezes Lucas (1995), Bojunga writes in an altogether more realistic style. In her latest work, Retratos de Carolina (2002), her continual experimentation as a writer has led her in a new direction: she allows us to follow the main character from childhood through to adulthood in a narrative partly written in the form of a meta-novel. Bojunga uses this device to extend the boundaries of literature for children and young people in an attempt, as she herself puts it, to make room both for herself and the characters she has created in one single house, "a house of my own invention".

Translations of Bojunga's works have been published in many languages including English, French, German, Italian, Spanish, Norwegian, Swedish, Icelandic, Bulgarian, Czech and Hebrew.

The biennial Hans Christian Andersen Award conferred by the International Board on Books for Young People is the highest recognition available to a writer or illustrator of children's books. Jansson received the writing award in 1966. The Astrid Lindgren Memorial Award from the Swedish Arts Council, which she won in 2004, is the biggest prize in children's literature.

Beside the Andersen and Lindgren Awards she has a number of others including the Jabuti Award (1973) and the Rattenfänger Literaturpreis (1986).

== Works in English ==
- The Companions – Translated by Ellen Watson. Illustrated by Larry Wilkes. 1st ed. New York: Farrar Straus Giroux, 1989 (Os Colegas, 1972)
- My Friend the Painter – Translated by Giovanni Pontiero. 1st ed. San Diego : Harcourt Brace Jovanovich, 1991 (O Meu Amigo Pintor, 1987)
