= Adolphe Delessert =

French explorer and naturalist

Adolphe François Delessert (15 September 1809 – 6 April 1869) was a French explorer and naturalist. A nephew of Baron Benjamin Delessert, he accompanied Perrottet on a journey to India and Southeast Asia. During the course of five years that began on 24 April 1834, he collected several new species of plants and animals including the Wayanad laughingthrush which he collected on the slopes of the Nilgiris and was named by Thomas C. Jerdon as Garrulax delesserti in his honour. He travelled through Mauritius, Reunion Island, Penang, Pondicherry, Malay Peninsula, Singapore, Java, and Madras returning on 30 April 1839.

He used German botanical artist Jean-Christophe Heyland (1791–1866), for some of the illustrations in his books.

In 1843 he published a book Souvenirs d'un Voyage dans l'Inde exécuté de 1834 à 1839 about his travels and included illustrations including landscapes by V. Dollet and animals by JG Prêtre.
