= Beatrice Alemagna =

Italian illustrator and author

Beatrice Alemagna (born 1973) is an Italian illustrator and author.

== Biography ==
Born in Bologna, Italy in 1973, Beatrice Alemagna studied at the Graphic School in Urbino (ISIA), and in 1997 moved to Paris, where she currently lives. She worked as a poster artist for Centre Pompidou for over 10 years.

Her book On a Magical Do-Nothing Day was among the ten best illustrated children's books of 2017, according to the New York Times and New York Public Library. This book was also awarded the Golden Medal for Original Art by the Society of Illustrators, New York. Beatrice Alemagna is the recipient of the 2010 Andersen Prize for Illustrator of the year, and was nominated to the Astrid Lindgren Memorial Award four times (in 2014, 2015, 2016 and 2017). She is the winner of Le Prix des Sorcières 2020 for her book Les choses qui s’en vont (Things That Go Away). In 2021, Alemagna received a Special Jury Award at the Premio Letteratura Ragazzi di Cento for her book A sbagliare le storie.

Alemagna has published more than 30 books for children, which have been translated into Swedish, English, Korean, Japanese, Chinese, Spanish, German, Greek, Portuguese, Polish, Dutch, Lithuanian.

Her first book published in the USA was The Wonderful Fluffy Little Squishy (2015) by HarperCollins, followed by On a Magical Do-Nothing Day (2017), Harold Snipperpot's Best Disaster Ever (2019), Things That Go Away (2020), and Never, Not Ever! (2021).

== Children's books ==
- Never, Not Ever! – USA (HarperCollins, 2021)
- Telling Stories Wrong (A sbagliare le storie) (text by Gianni Rodari) – Italy (Emme Edizioni, 2020), Korea (Booklight, 2020), USA (Enchanted Lion Books, 2022), translated by Anthony Shugaar
- Things That Go Away (Les Choses qui s'en vont) – France (Hélium, 2019), USA (Abrams, 2020), Italy (Topipittori, 2019)
- Harold Snipperpot's Best Disaster Ever – HarperCollins (USA, 2019), translated by Edward Gauvin;
- Lotta Combinaguai Sa Fare Tutto by Astrid Lindgren, Italy (Mondadori, 2018);
- On a Magical Do-Nothing Day (Un grand jour de rien) France (Albin Michel jeunesse/Trapèze, 2016), USA (Harper Collins, 2017).
- Picasso & Lump (text by Nancy Lim) – USA (MoMA, 2016)
- Lotta combinaguai by Astrid Lindgren – Italy (Mondadori, 2015)
- The Wonderful Fluffy Little Squishy (Le merveilleux dodu-velu-petit) – France (Albin Michel, 2014), USA (Enchanted Lion, 2015)
- Little big Boubo – England (Tate Publishers, 2014)
- The Five Misfits (I cinque Malfatti) – Italy (Topipittori, 2014), England (Frances Lincoln Children's Books, 2015)
- Bon voyage, Bébé! – France (Hélium, 2013)
- La gigantesque petite chose – England (Tate Publishers, 2018)
- Jo singe garçon – France (Autrement jeunesse, 2010)
- The Bug's Books – England (Phaidon)
- Oméga et l'ourse (text by Guillaume Guéraud)
- What is a Child? (Che cos'è un bambino?) – Italy (Topipittori, 2008), England (Tate Publishing, 2016)
- Karl Ibou – France (Autrement jeunesse - 2008)
- A Lion in Paris (Un lion à Paris) – France (Autrement jeunesse, 2006), England (Tate Publishing, 2014)
- Comptines du jardin d'Eden, CD Book – France (Didier éditions, 2005)
- Les corbeaux de Pearblossom (text by Aldous Huxley) – France (Gallimard jeunesse, 2005)
- Je voulais une tortue – Editions du Panama - France 2005
- La promenade d'un distrait (text by Gianni Rodari), picture book and short movie
- Portraits – France (Seuil jeunesse/ CIELJ, 2003)
- My Love (Mon amour) – France (Autrement jeunesse, 2002)
- Après Noël – France (Autrement jeunesse - 2001)

== Awards ==
- Things That Go Away (Les Choses qui s'en vont): Winner of LaAv Infanzia Prize (Italy) 2021; Winner of Le Prix des Sorcières (France), 2020; Val de Marne Prize (France), 2019
- On a Magical Do-Nothing Day: winner of the English Association Book award (England) 2018; Selected by The New York Times and New York Public Library among the ten best children's books in 2017 (USA); Gold medal of the Society of illustrators, New York, 2017; Winner of the Grand prix de l'illustration, Moulins, France, 2017; Winner of the Landerneau Prize as Best book of 2016, France, 2017.
- The Wonderful Fluffy Little Squishy: winner of the Mildred L. Batchelder Award, USA, 2016, selected for Pépites de Montreuil, France, 2014
- The Five Misfits: LiBeRmagazine's Prize as the best book, Italy, 2015; First Prize of Salon du livre de Gaillac, France, 2015
- Bon voyage, Bébé!: Baby readers Prize from Ville de Nanterre, France, 2015
- What is a Child? Crescer: magazine's Prize as the best picture book, Brazil, 2014; selected for "the World through Picture Book" IFLA (International Federation of Library Associations and Institutions), Netherlands, 2015
- A Lion in Paris: National Prize "Nati per leggere", Italy, 2010; special mention at Bologna Book Fair Award - Italy 2007, selected for the White Ravens, Germany, 2007; selected for Baobab Prize of Salon de Montreuil, France, 2006
- Après Noël: Octogones Prize, France, 2002.

== Exhibitions ==
Beatrice Alemagna has exhibited her work at several solo and collective exhibitions in Paris, Bologna, Bordeaux, Charleville, Munich, Reims, Lisbon, Tokyo, Sapporo, Kyoto, Stockholm, Dublin, Beijing, Abu Dhabi, Sofia, Cairo, Madrid, Berlin.

Her selected exhibitions include:

- 2023: Retrospective at Espace Saint-Rémi, Bordeaux, France.
- 2018: Retrospective at Cultural Centre C'era una volta, Bastia, France
- 2017: Face à face, Salon du livre de Montreuil, France, The Zoo inside of Beatrice Alemagna, Zoo Gallery Bologna, Italy, World of Colour (w/Chris Haughton), Dublin, Ireland, The Original Art 2017 Exhibit at the Museum of Illustration at the Society of Illustrators in NY.
- 2015–16: The American Society of illustrators, New York, USA, 2015, Eccellenze italiane by Bologna Book Fair, Italian Cultural Institute in Madrid, Spain, and Berlin, Germany
- 2014–15: Facce d'infanzia, Italian Cultural Institute of Stockholm, Sweden
