= Bologna Children's Book Fair =

Professional fair for children's books in Italy

The Bologna Children's Book Fair or La fiera del libro per ragazzi is a significant book fair for children's books.

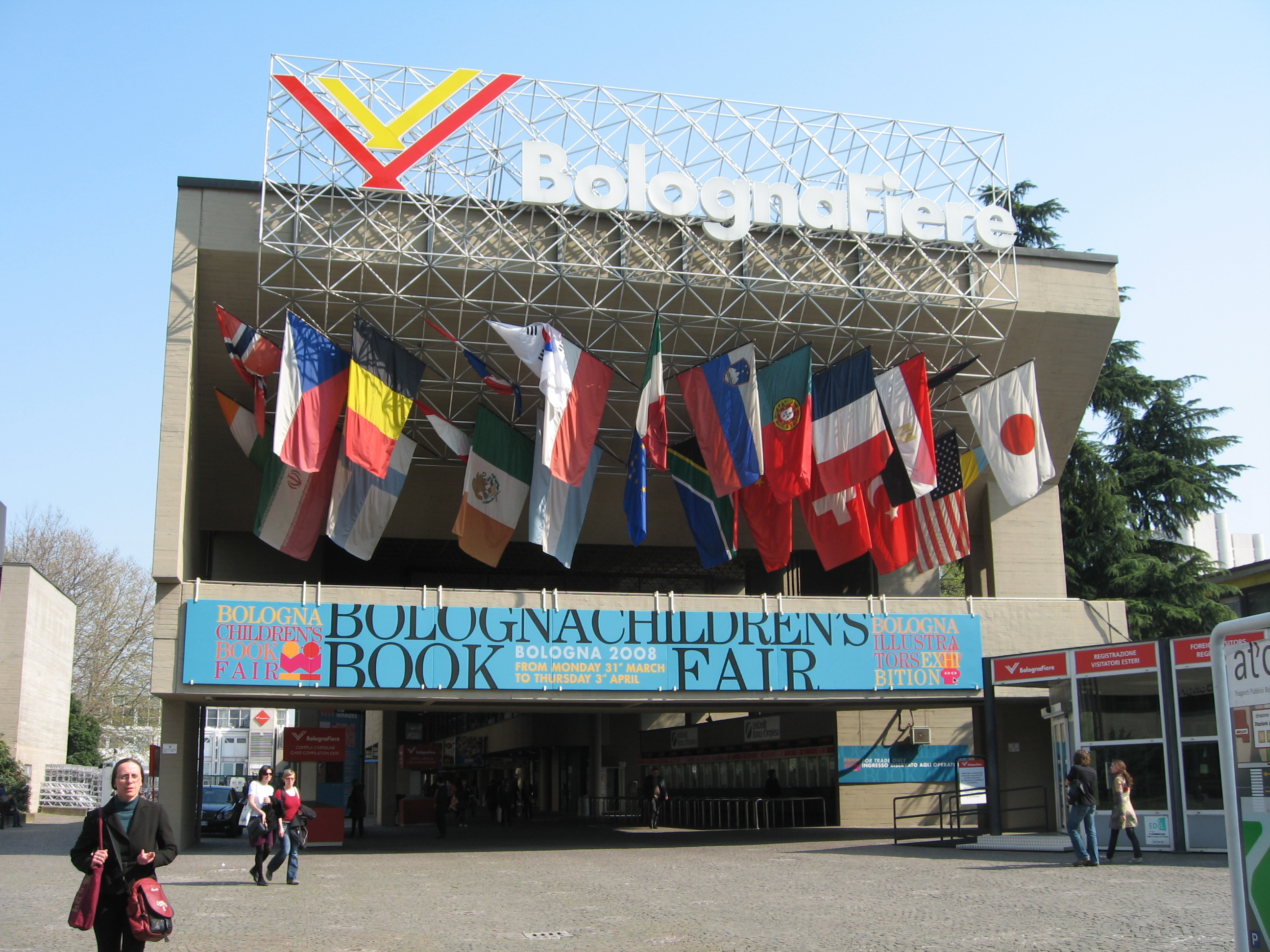
The Entrance to The Bologna Children's Book Fair in 2008

Since 1963, it is held yearly for four days in March or April in Bologna, Italy. It is the meeting place for all professionals involved with creating and publishing children's books and is mainly used for the buying and selling of rights, both for translations and for derived products like movies or animated series. It is also the event where a number of major awards are given, the BolognaRagazzi Awards, in four categories (Fiction, Non-fiction, New Horizons for the non-Western world and Opera Prima for first works). During the fair, some major awards are announced, including the biannual Hans Christian Andersen Awards and the Astrid Lindgren Memorial Award. However, these are independent of the fair.

Since 1967, the Illustrators Exhibition within the Bologna Children's Book Fair presents the works of the illustrators selected by the jury which consists of five international experts (two publishers and three illustrators or teachers of illustration). Each year, five pieces of original artwork are submitted by around 3,000 artists from more than 70 nations.

Due to the ongoing COVID-19 pandemic the 57th fair in 2020 was first postponed, then later cancelled. To facilitate the fair's main purpose, the international sale of rights and other publishing agreements, the organisers are creating a digital platform.

On April 9, 2021, the Bologna Children's Book Fair announced the cancelation of its physical 2021 fair due to the COVID-19 pandemic. The 59th edition of Bologna Children's Book Fair took place in Bologna from 21 to 24 March 2022.

== Awards associated with the Fair ==
- The Hans Christian Andersen Award
- The Astrid Lindgren Memorial Award
- The Silent Book Contest - also known as the Gianni De Conno Award
- The BolognaRagazzi Award (BRAW)

== See also ==
- Books in Italy
- Bologna Salaborsa Children’s Library - all winning books from the Bologna Children's Book Fair from 1966 onwards are held at this library
