= Étienne Delessert (banker) =

French banker, insurer and industrialist

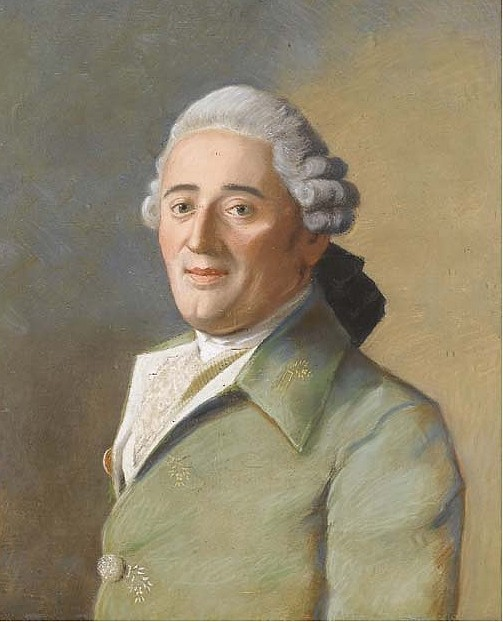

Étienne Gabriel Delessert (30 April 1735 - 18 June 1816) was a French banker, insurer, and industrialist. His family was Calvinist and was exiled from France around 1685 after the Revocation of the Edict of Nantes. Several members of his family returned to France in 1735. He was born in Lyon. Aged 20 he was put in charge of the trading house which his father had set up in Lyon. He was imprisoned after the French Revolution and narrowly escaped the death sentence. He was the father of the banker and naturalist Benjamin Delessert.

== Biography ==
The Delessert family were Protestants farmers from Switzerland and Étienne's father Benjamin came to Lyon in 1725 where he began to trade in silk and founding a bank. Benjamin married Marguerite (1707-1799), daughter of a Marseille banker Étienne Brun. Étienne Delessert was the second son, born in Lyon. In 1766, Étienne married Madeleine-Catherine Boy de La Tour (1747-1816), the daughter of Swiss merchant Pierre Boy de La Tour (1706-1759) who was a protector of Jean-Jacques Rousseau (1712-1778). Rousseau remained a friend of the family and was involved in discussions with Marguerite and her daughters on natural history. The sons Benjamin (1773 – 1847) and Étienne (1771-1794) were sent to study at the University of Edinburgh and were influenced by a number of leading figures of the period including Adam Smith, James Watt, and others . In 1777, the Paris banking firm De Lessert & Company was begun on Rue Mauconseil. He directed the Caisse d’escompte from 1781 to 1783. He also founded the Caisse Patriotique de Paris and in 1786 he was involved in the establishment of a fire insurance company which was dissolved in 1793. In 1793, following the French revolution, he was imprisoned at Port-libre prison. He was released following the fall of Robespierre. After release he left his bank to the management of his son Benjamin Delessert. He then was involved in importing and establishing the farming of Merino sheep in France, the introduction of agricultural machinery and the founding of two free schools. After the death of his wife in 1816 he lived at his home behind Bullion Hotel where he died.
