= Hottinger =

Disambiguation

Hottinger or Hottinguer is a surname. Notable people with the surname include:

== Swiss family ==
- Klaus Hottinger (1467–1524), first martyr of the Swiss Protestantism movement
- Johann Heinrich Hottinger (1620–1667), Swiss philologist and theologian
- Johann Jakob Hottinger (theologian) (1652–1735), Swiss theologian and Church historian
- Johann Jakob Hottinger (1783–1860), Swiss historian
- Baron Jean-Conrad Hottinguer (1764–1841), Swiss-born banker who later became Baron Hottinguer of the French empire
- Baron Jean–Henri Hottinguer (1803–1866), first-born son of Baron Jean-Conrad Hottinger and the second Baron Hottinguer
- Baron Rodolphe Hottinguer (1835–1920), first-born son of Baron Jean-Henri Hottinguer and the third Baron Hottinguer
- Baron Henri Hottinguer (1868–1943), first-born son of Rodolphe Hottingue and the fourth Baron Hottinguer
- Rodolphe Hottinger (1902–1985), Swiss banker, fifth Baron Hottinguer
- Rodolphe Hottinger (born 1956), Swiss banker, seventh Baron Hottinguer
- Mary Hottinger (née Mackie; 1893–1978), Scottish translator and author

== Other ==
- Jay Hottinger (born 1969), Republican member of the Ohio House of Representatives
- John Hottinger (born 1945), Minnesota politician and a former member and majority leader of the Minnesota Senate
- Lukas Hottinger (born 1933), paleontologist, biologist and geologist.
- Markus Höttinger (1956–1980), Austrian Formula Two driver

== See also ==
- Hottinger Group
- Hottinguer family
