= Johann Hottinger =

Johann Hottinger may refer to:

- Johann Heinrich Hottinger (1620–1667), Swiss philologist and theologian
- Johann Jakob Hottinger (theologian) (1652–1735), Swiss theologian
- Johann Jakob Hottinger (historian) (1783–1860), Swiss historian
