= Rodolphe Hottinguer =

Rodolphe Hottinguer may refer to:

- Rodolphe Hottinguer (1835–1920)
- Rodolphe Hottinguer (1902–1985), fifth baron Hottinguer
- Rodolphe Hottinger (born 1956), Swiss banker of the House of Hottinguer
