= Johann Jakob Hottinger =

Johann Jakob Hottinger may refer to:

- Johann Jakob Hottinger (theologian) (1652–1735), Swiss theologian
- Johann Jakob Hottinger (historian) (1783–1860), Swiss historian
