= Saadia Azankot =

Saadia ben Levi Azankot (Hebrew: סְעַדְיָה בֵּן לֵוִי אֲזַנְקוֹט; fl. 1629–1650) was a 17th-century Jewish Moroccan Orientalist.

== Biography ==
Azankot lived in Holland in the first half of the seventeenth century, where he was teacher of Jewish literature to Johann Heinrich Hottinger.

He published a versified paraphrase of the Book of Esther in Amsterdam in 1647, rhymed in the form of an acrostic, under the title Iggeret ha-Purim (אִגֶּרֶת הַפּוּרִים). The Bodleian Library holds two manuscripts bearing his name: one containing a transcription of Maimonides' Guide for the Perplexed in Arabic characters, which Azankot made for Jacobus Golius between 1644 and 1645 and contains at the end a poem with Azankot's acrostic; the other manuscript containing Hebrew translation of the Lamiat al-Ayam of Husain bin Ali, appended to a printed copy of the same.
