= Hottinguer family =

House of Hottinger

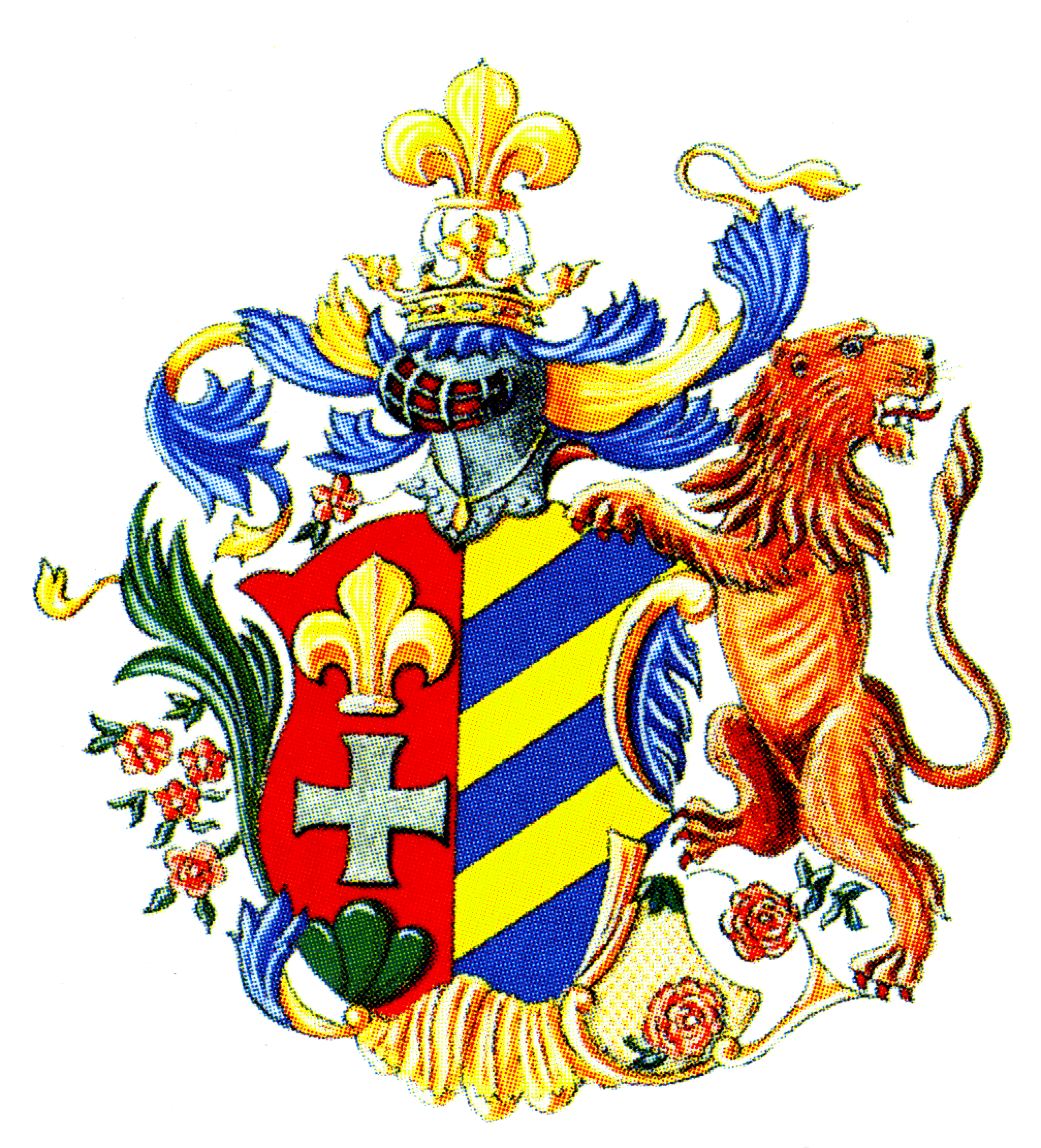
Arms of the Hottinger family

Hottinger first appears in the annals of the town of Zöllikon, near Zurich, in 1362. The town had recently joined the Swiss Confederation, and was poised to become a thriving center for trade. In 1401, three members of the Hottinger family were named Grand Burghers of the city. Their names Hans, Heinrich and Rudolf – or, in their French variants, Jean, Henri and Rodolphe – have marked the family dynasty for over 500 years. During the 15th and 16th centuries, their descendants oversaw the canton's progressive transformation from a rural to a financial economy, taking an active role in the region's political, cultural and religious life all the way into the 18th century.

== Five generations of doctors and pastors (1467–1732) ==
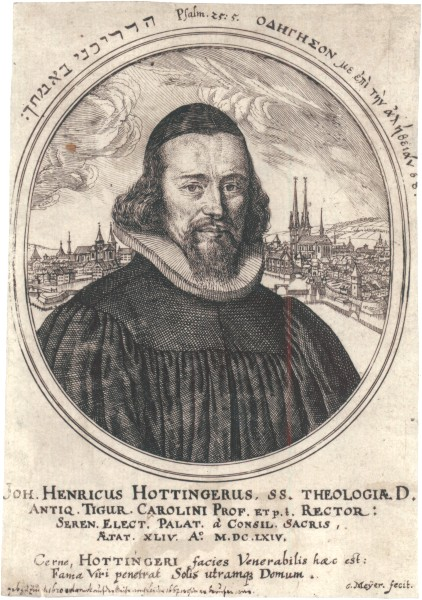
Hans-Heinrich Hottinger (1620–1667), Dean of the University of Heidelberg

His grandson Sébastien Hottinger (1538–1600), was a doctor and deputy of the Zurich City Council. Hans-Heinrich Hottinger, Sébastien Hottinger's brother, produced for his part an illustrious line of mathematicians, physicists, doctors, and theologians, among which Hans-Heinrich Hottinger (1620–1667), better known as Johann Heinrich Hottinger, a famous orientalist, historian, theologian and Dean of the University of Heidelberg.

Wolfgang Hottinger's son, Hans-Rudolf (1600–1639) charted a new destiny for the Hottingers as clergymen. His son, Rudolf (1642–1692), and grandson Hans-Rudolf (1673–1732) also became pastors. Zurich rapidly prospered during the second half of the 17th century with the end of the Thirty Year War (1618–1648), the Treaty of Westphalia, and Switzerland's independence from the Holy Roman Empire proclaiming the Confederacy's neutrality. There is little surprise, therefore, that a branch of the Hottinger family would become involved in commerce and trade. It is from this branch that the financial dynasty would emerge.

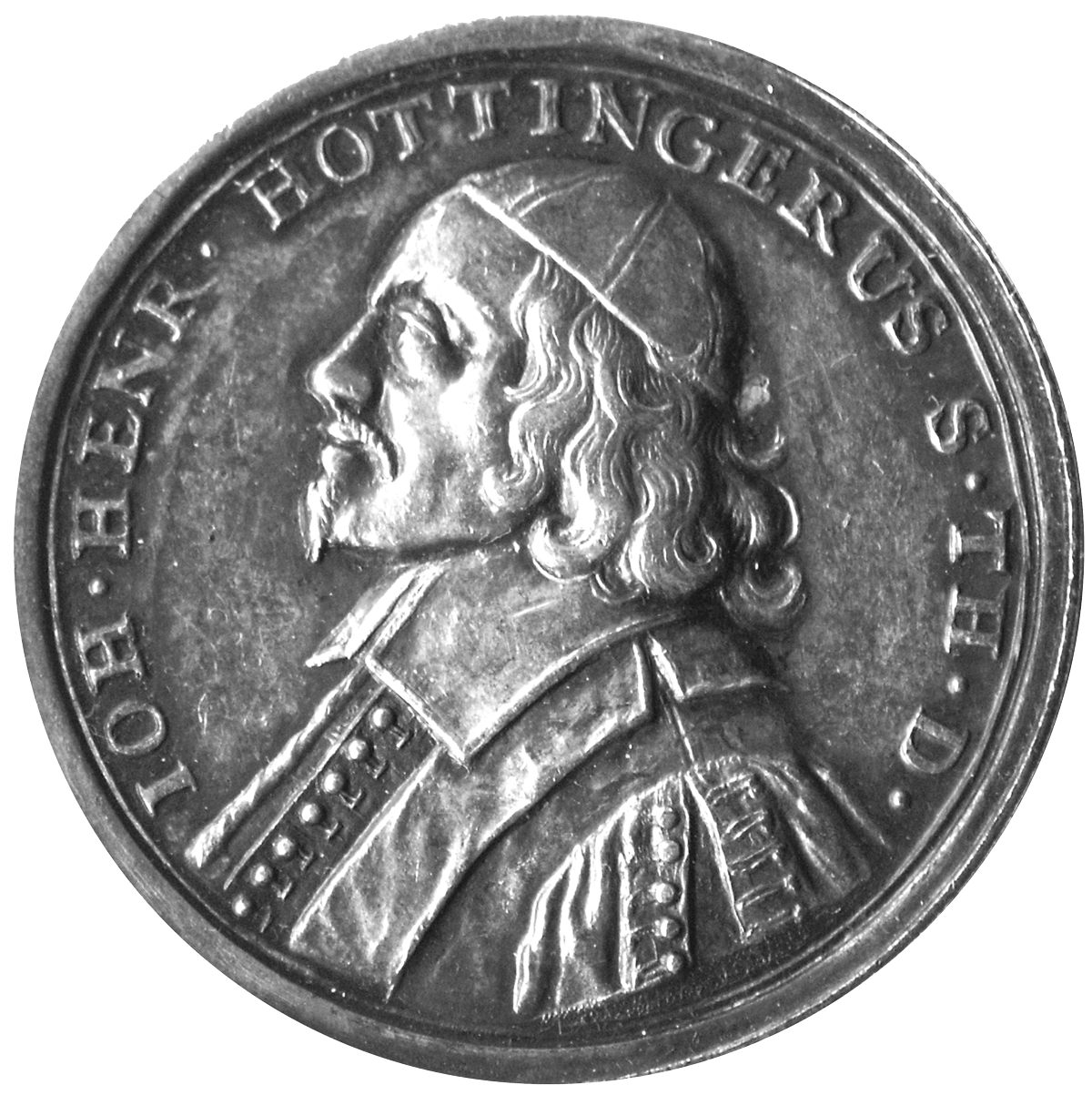
5 Ducat Austrian gold coin (1720) depicting Johann Heinrich Hottinger

== Businessmen and politicians (1712–1764) ==
Johannes Hottinger was born in 1712, the sole surviving son among Hans-Rudolf and Verena Hottinger's five children. The year of Johannes's birth was marked by the end of the 2nd Battle of Villmergen, following which Zurich was fully able to capitalize on its position as a major European crossroads and trading center. Johannes's career would be further aided by the fact that his uncle, Christof Hottinger, was Deputy of the City Council for the powerful saffron corporation and Treasurer of the Grossmünster.

In 1734, Johannes married the daughter of Johannès Cramer, a draper and likewise Deputy of the City Council as representative of the saffron corporation. The couple's three sons – Johann-Heinrich (1734–1808), Johannes (1738–1797) and Johann-Rudolf (1739–1809) would all be raised from an early age with a keen appreciation for trade and business. All three would marry the daughters of well-established merchants, and expanded their business by establishing relations with the Geneva banking house Passavant, de Candolle, Bertrand & Cie.

== First steps in finance (1764–1784) ==
Johann-Konrad (1764–1841), or Jean-Conrad in its French version, was Johann-Rudolf Hottinger's second son, and the one who would definitively establish the family as a financial dynasty. Like many sons of wealthy Zurich families, he was sent to Mulhouse in 1779 for a traineeship with a cotton factory. But Jean-Conrad was less interested in cotton trading, silk printing or smelting than in impressing the economist M. Wolf, with whom he resided, with his aptitude for drawing and mathematics. As he became more and more interested in finance, Jean-Conrad eventually answered the call of his uncle Johann Heinrich Hottinger to join him in Geneva in 1783.

Home to many Protestant banking firms, Geneva was certainly better suited to Jean-Conrad Hottinger’s aspirations. Thanks to his uncle’s connections, Jean-Conrad was able to train as a banker with Passavant, de Candolle, Bertrand & Cie. Over the ensuing years, Jean-Conrad Hottinger would display a thirst for knowledge and a deepening interest in the issue of public debt, notably in France and Great Britain. Soon he expressed a desire to go to Paris, following in the footsteps of Jacques Necker, director-general of the French royal finances.

== From clerk to banker (1784–1787) ==
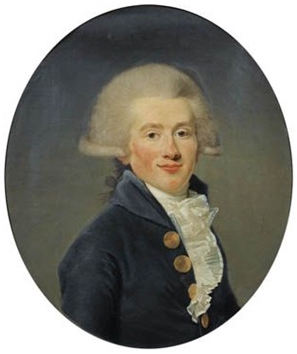
Baron Jean-Conrad Hottinguer (1764–1841)

Jean-Conrad Hottinger left for the French capital that same year with a letter of introduction by his former employees. This enabled him to start clerking for Le Couteulx & Cie, a highly reputable business, which had been ennobled in the time of Louis XIV. Back in Zurich, a number of illustrious wealthy businessmen – among whom Jean Conrad and Salomon Escher, Martin Usteri, and Jean Conrad Ott – gathered in early 1786 to discuss how to invest in Paris and which banks to contact. Jean Conrad Escher put forward the name of Hottinger, “the son of Jean Rodophe Hottinger and a young clerk in the service of Le Couteulx.”

Arriving in Paris, Jean Conrad and Salomon Escher met with Denis de Rougemont de Chatellois, at the head of an old Parisian banking house, which, at the time, was experiencing credit problems. The Eschers were therefore able to suggest a partnership with the person of their choice. They met with then 23-year-old Jean-Conrad Hottinger, and an immediate bond was forged between the three men. Within the short space of a meeting, Jean-Conrad went from banking clerk to bank owner. On 1 August 1786, the creation of “Rougemont, Hottinger & Cie” was announced, with Jean Conrad benefitting from 2/13th share. A few months later, in early 1787, the new bank was listed in the Royal Almanac, with offices at Rue Croix-des-Petits-Champs, Hôtel de Beaupreaux.

== The French Revolution (1788–1798) ==
The bank expanded markedly within months, and already differences appeared between the two associates: “M. Hottinger, highly intelligent and capable, aims to immediately make a fortune; I only wish to preserve mine,” wrote de Rougemont. Soon thereafter, de Rougemont encountered problems that cause the bank's Swiss underwriters, Usteri and Escher, to lose confidence in him. Arriving in Paris amidst social upheaval in 1788, they decide to break ranks with de Rougemont. The following month, however, a number of bankruptcies forced them to reconsider, and matters were further complicated the following year by the French Revolution.

The split then became political, as Jean-Conrad Hottinger pushed to extend the assignats (notes issued as paper currency from 1789 to 1796 by the revolutionary government on the security of confiscated lands) to the financial world. Their partnership was effectively dissolved at end 1790. For his part, Jean-Conrad had already entered an agreement with the former banker of the King of Poland, Paul Sellouf in July 1790. But ageing and sick, Sellouf retired only a few months later, leaving Jean-Conrad with an extensive and select clientele.

As of 15 October 1790, Jean-Conrad Hottinguer found himself the sole owner of a banking institution that bore his name. The following years were not without turmoil, however, even though Jean-Conrad Hottinguer eventually emerged unscathed. According to The World of Private Banking, he left Paris in 1794 to pursue business opportunities in the United States. “When he came back to Paris in 1798, he founded “Hottinguer & Co.” and soon thereafter opened branches at Le Havre [1802] and other French ports. He became a financial advisor of Talleyrand and is known as one of the first regents of the Banque de France.”

== Establishing a financial dynasty (1798–1832) ==
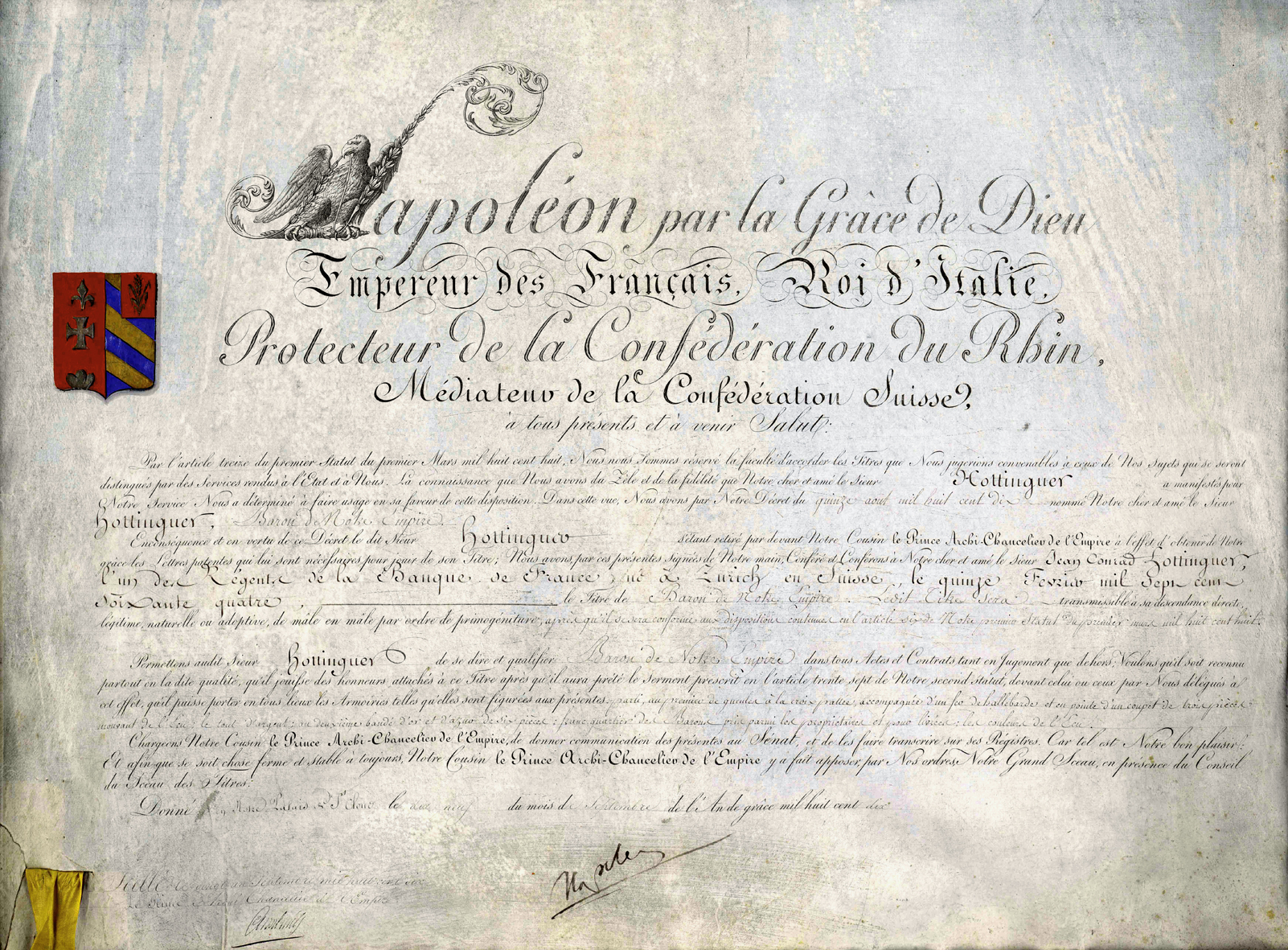
Napoleon I of France names Jean-Conrad Hottinguer Baron of the Empire

Jean-Conrad Hottinguer – a ‘u’ had been added to the name to preserve the Germanic pronunciation of the name – continued to profit from his knowledge of the issue of public debt. In particular, he took a strong interest in the new commercial laws promulgated by Napoleon as of 1807. Shortly thereafter, in the throes of several victories, the Emperor decided to bestow titles and honors on affluent members of society. Marshals were named dukes, ministers were named counts, and mayors, bankers and bishops became barons.

On 19 September 1810, Jean-Conrad Hottinguer was named Baron of the Empire. He went on to have six daughters and two sons. The eldest, Jean-Henri, inherited the title and the family business. Born in 1803, Jean-Henri Hottinguer took over his father's position at the head of the bank in January 1833. Jean-Conrad had by now born out Napoleon's defeat – playing no small role in handling France's massive war debt – as well as the July Revolution of 1830. The family fortune was made, and Jean-Henri's focus would be to expand business abroad.

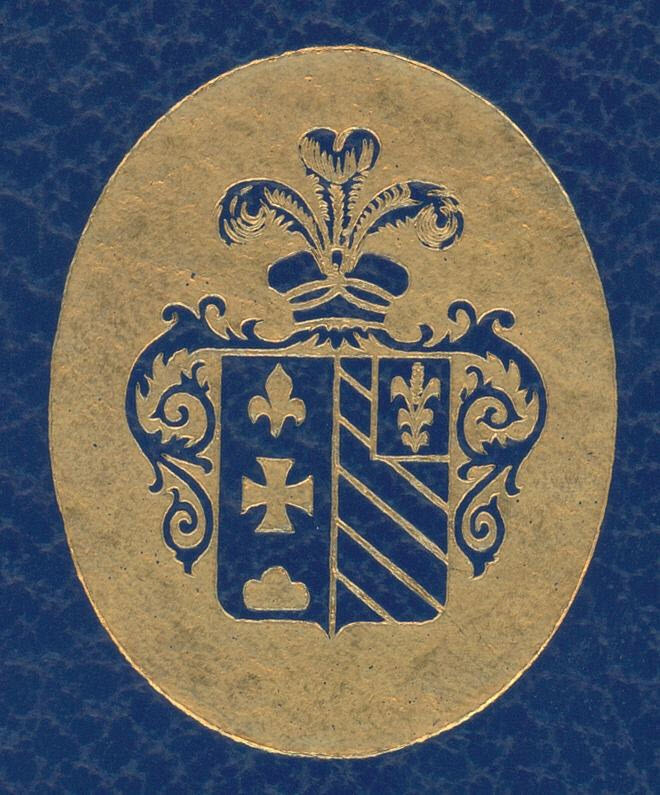
Armes Baron Hottinguer

== Entering the Industrial Age (1833–1866) ==
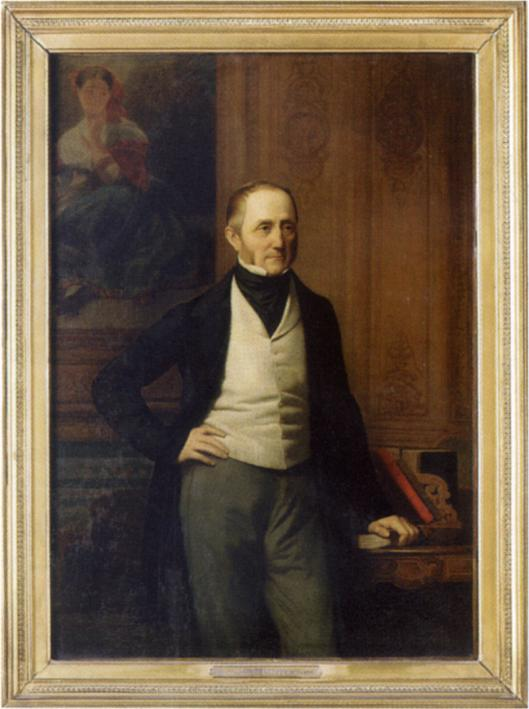
Baron Jean-Henri Hottinguer (1803–1866)

Jean-Henri's life was at least as eventful and adventurous as his father's. He traveled to England when he was only 15 years old. At the age of 23, he sailed to New Orleans to establish new trade business with America, made possible by the bank's fleet of ships built by his father. He then made his way to Washington D.C. by steamboat, carriage and rail. In 1832, Jean-Henri married Caroline Delessert, the daughter of Baron François Delessert. In 1818, Jules Paul Benjamin Delessert and Hottinguer created the first savings company and contingency fund in France for modest earners – a precursor to pension funds – called “Caisse d’épargne et de prévoyance.”

Caroline was the last in the line of the Delessert financial dynasty, and Jean-Henri Hottinguer took over the bank in 1848. His travels did not end after taking over the reins of the family business. He was quick to recognize the potential of the new technologies of his time, notably electricity, and participated in many of the business ventures linked to the economic development of Europe in the mid-19th century. Jean-Henri was notably instrumental in developing the French railway system, as well as, in 1852, contributing in the creation of the French waterworks company, the Compagnie Générale des Eaux, known today as Veolia Environment. He also invested in Russia and was involved in restructuring Mexico’s finances in the early years of the French intervention.

== Fall of the Ottoman Empire - Banque de France nationalisation (1867–1950) ==
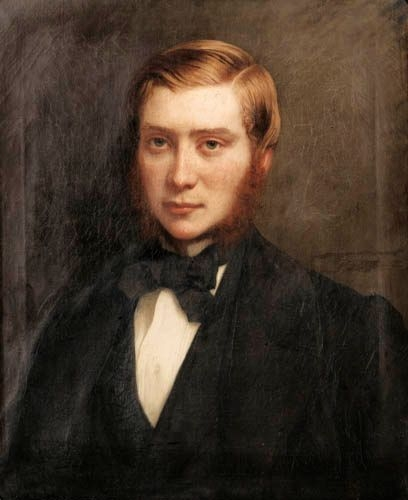
Baron Rodolphe Hottinguer (1835–1920)

Jean-Henri Hottinguer died in 1866, leaving the bank in the hands of his son, Rodolphe Hottinguer (1835–1920), who had led a group of six European financiers in meetings with the Grand Vizier of the Ottoman Empire, resulting in the creation, in 1863, of the Ottoman Bank (today part of Grindlays Bank).

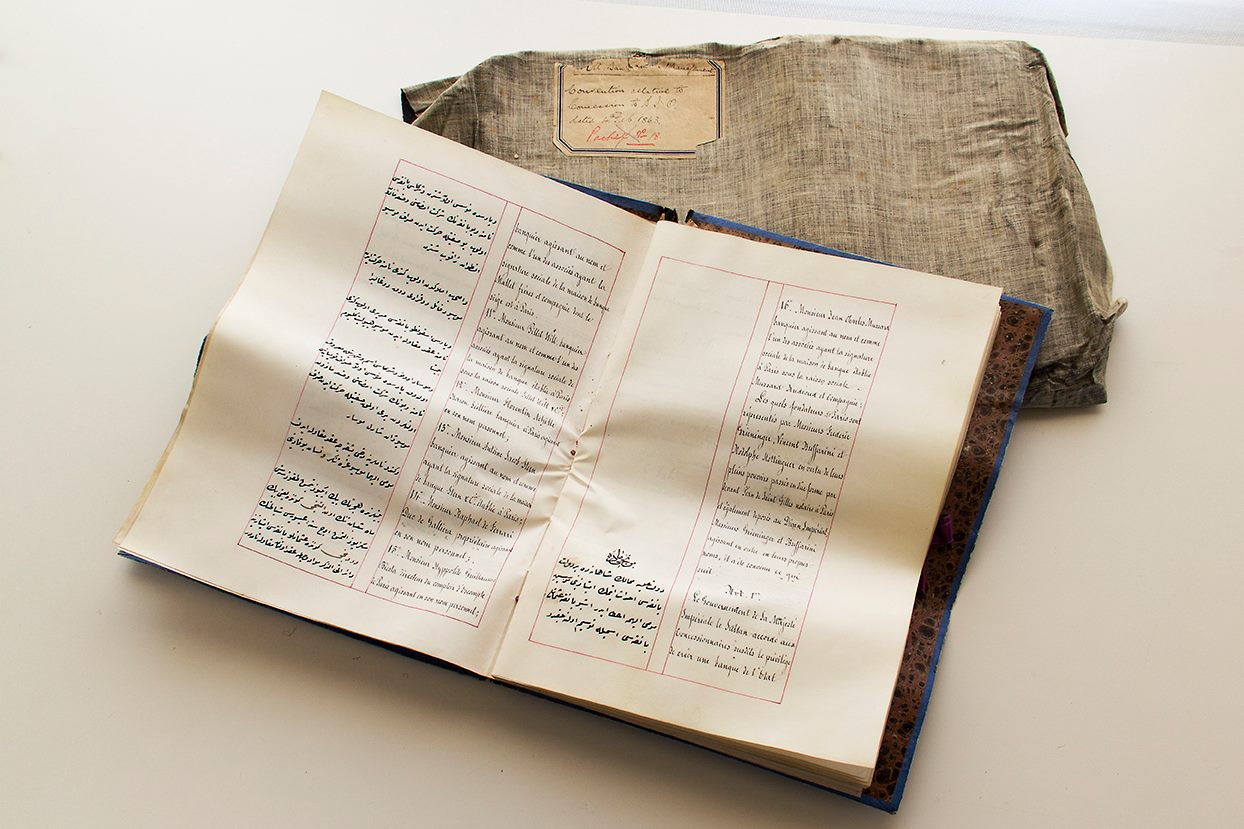
Act of concession of the Imperial Ottoman Bank, February 4, 1863. (22175414171)

Hottinguer & Cie. survived due to its continued involvement in the major financial events of the time, as well as Rodolphe Hottinguer's inherited interest and knowledge of the issue of public debt. In 1890, the bank celebrated its centennial, as Rodolphe Hottinger continued to pursue his father's preoccupation with the development of France's industrial infrastructure. He occupied the position of Vice President of the Paris-Lyon-Méditérannée (PLM) railway.

By the time of World War I, Rodolphe could rely on the help of his son Henri Hottinguer (1868–1943), who was present in 1919 at the signing of the Armistice with Germany, and on whose shoulders would fall the task of coping with the Great Depression. In turn, Henri relied on his son, Rodolphe Hottinguer (1902–1985), during World War II. As he worked hard to keep the business afloat and preserve the family domain of Castle Piple, Rodolphe consigned his memories of the war to a black notebook. These memories include retrieving a list of Hottinguer employees from a German employment office at Chateaudun, and racing down a deserted Rue Royale in Paris, in August 1944, chased by a truck full of German soldiers.

== International Expansion (1950–2015) ==
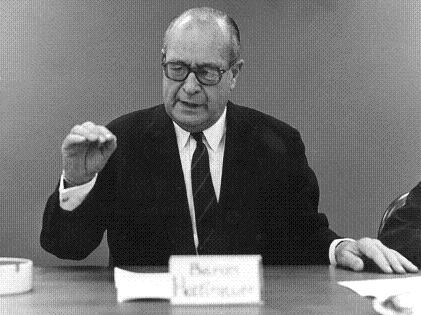
Baron Rodolphe Hottinguer (1902–1985)

With Baron Rodolphe Hottinguer (1902–1985), the bank embraced a modern approach to banking. He managed to preserve the tradition of private banking and the qualities of a family-oriented, human size institution. In 1945, Hottinguer & Cie. in Paris joined in creating the Drouot insurance company, which would merge with Mutuelles Unies in 1982 to form AXA.

Rodolphe Hottinguer occupied posts as vice-chairman of the Paris Chamber of Commerce and Industry, Chairman of the International Chamber of Commerce, Chairman of the European Banking Federation and, for more than 35 years, Chairman of the French Banking Association now called Fédération Bancaire Française. Rodolphe Hottinguer died in 1985 leaving his son, Henri, a banking legacy in solid shape and sound condition. The Banque Hottinguer in Paris was sold to the Credit Suisse in 1997.

In 1968, Baron Henri Hottinguer (1934–2015), Rodolphe's son, returned to Zurich and founded Hottinger & Cie, Zurich, and with the help of his sons, Rodolphe and Frédéric Hottinger, they started the Swiss and the international development of the Hottinger Banking Group. They founded Hottinger Capital Corp in New-York, opened a Geneva branch in 1987, and managed Hottinger Capital SA in Geneva as of 1998. A year later, they initiated a proactive international policy, based on a system of strategic partnerships, or “affiliated companies,” to expand the bank's reach without unduly expanding its size. The Hottinger Banking Group had branches in Basel, Brig, Geneva, New-York, Sion, Zurich and wholly separate and independently capitalised Hottinger businesses in London, Luxembourg and Nassau.

In 2007, as Paul Hottinguer retired, two first cousins of the Hottinguer family became partners of the Bank: Paul de Pourtales became Managing Partner, and Jonathan Bowdler-Raynar as Limited Partner. In December 2009 Baron Rodolphe Hottinger left the Hottinger Banking Group and created La Financière Rodolphe Hottinger SA. In May 2010, to prepare the future challenges of the new financial environment, the bank became Hottinger & Cie SA with the arrival of new partners.

The Swiss division of Hottinger Banking Group closed its doors for the last time in October 2015, due to the increased regulatory demands in Switzerland.

== Modern Era (2015–present) ==
Following the death of Baron Henri Hottinger (1934–2015) his son, Frédéric Hottinger inherited the majority of his father's estate, in particular, Groupe Financière Hottinger and Co (established in 1981 and chaired by the Baron).

In November 2015 The Luxembourg family holding company, Hottinger Financial SA, entered into merger discussions with a UK based international multi-family office, Archimedes Private Office Limited. The Financial Conduct Authority (FCA) approved the merger of Hottinger and Archimedes in July 2016 with the new enlarged group continuing to trade as Hottinger Group.

The Luxembourg division of Groupe Financière Hottinger & Co was not part of the merger creating Hottinger Group. In 2017, Iteram Investments, a fund management business, merged with Hottinger Luxembourg. Frédéric Hottinger became a board member of Iteram Investments.

In February 2019, a majority stake in the Bahamas division Of Hottinger Group (Hottinger Banking & Trust) was sold to Ansbacher Private Bank. The sale was not without contention as a minority shareholder objected to the sale and legal proceedings with Vernes Holdings ensued.

Edmond de Rothschild Group announced the sale of their U.K. wealth management business to Hottinger Group on 26 October 2021. The transaction, subject to the UK regulator's consent, would see the clients and staff of Edmond de Rothschild Private Merchant Banking LLP transfer to Hottinger. Connected to this transaction, Edmond de Rothschild acquired a 42.5% stake in Hottinger Group.

== Sources ==
- http://www.gameo.org/encyclopedia/contents/hottinger_klaus_d._1524
