= Baron Henri Hottinguer =

Fourth Baron Hottinguer

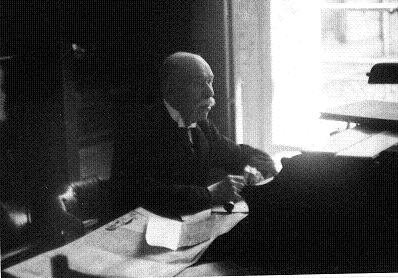
- Born: 15 September 1868; Castle Piple, Boissy-Saint-Léger, France
- Died: 21 July 1943 (aged 74)
- Occupation: Banker

Baron Henri Hottinguer (September 15, 1868 – July 21, 1943) was the first-born son of Baron Rodolphe Hottinguer. He had a long and prosperous life, and during his era the bank Hottinger & Cie accomplished many achievements. He took control of Hottinger and Cie around the age of 52, following the death of his father.

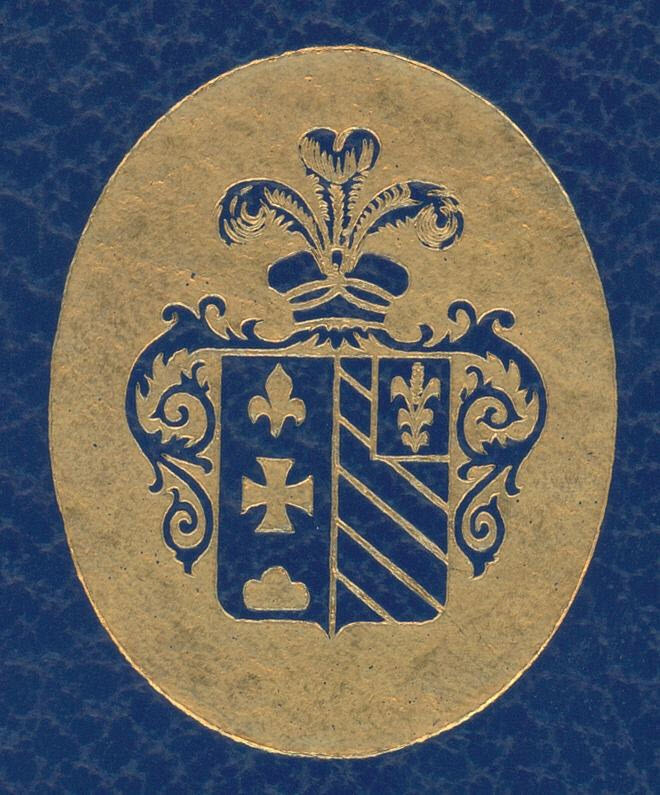
Baron Hottinguer Coat of Arms

Like his grandfather and his father, at the age of 20 he prepared for his first great voyage bound for England, where he would study finance at Oxford University. After completing his education, he went to the United States of America. Like all the barons in the family, Hottinguer had to do this voyage. During his time in America he was successful, he established many contacts that would help in the future. Also, like some of his predecessors, he would meet an American woman who would become his wife, Marian Hall Munroe, daughter of Wall Street banker John Munroe. His journeys did not stop there, he would go on a prolonged tour around Europe, by traveling to Lithuania and Russia.

Under his direction, Hottinger & Cie participated in the creation of Banque de l'Union Parisienne, which then merged with the Crédit du Nord. He was one of the leading parties in the funding of the Trans-Siberian Railway. He died suddenly on 21 July 1943. He was succeeded by his oldest son Baron Rodolphe Hottinguer (1902–1985).

== See also ==
- Hottinguer Family
- Hottinger Group

== Sources ==
- Youssef Cassis, Capitals of Capital, A History of International Financial Centres, 1780–2005. (ISBN 9780521845359 | ISBN 0-521-84535-1)
- Max Gerard, Messieurs Hottinguer Banquiers A Paris, Paris 1968.
- www.trans-siberia.com
- www.hottinger.co.uk
- www.credit-du-nord.fr

Preceded by Baron Rodolphe Hottinguer (1835-1920)	Baron of Hottinguer; 1920-1943	Succeeded by Baron Rodolphe Hottinguer (1902-1985)
