= Rodolphe Hottinger =

Seventh Baron Hottinguer

Baron Rodolphe Hottinger
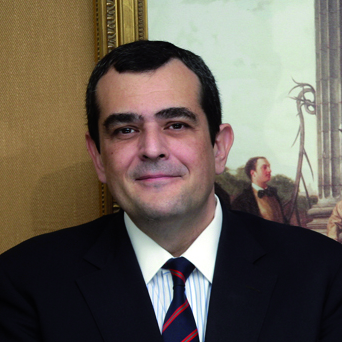
- Born: August 14, 1956 (age 69); Paris
- Occupation: Private Banker
- Spouse: Hanna
- Children: Henri (born 1983); Richard (born 1985); Peter (born 1987)

Baron Rodolphe Hottinger (born 14 August 1956 in Paris) is a Swiss banker of the House of Hottinguer. His ancestor, Jean-Conrad Hottinger, created the Bank Rougemont, Hottinger & Cie. in 1786. In 1799, he added a 'u' to the family name, to preserve the Germanic pronunciation; see also House of Hottinguer.

After 20 years as CEO of the Hottinger Group, Rodolphe Hottinger is now CEO of La Financière Rodolphe Hottinger SA He is also a Board Member of Petrolin SA.

== Early life and education ==
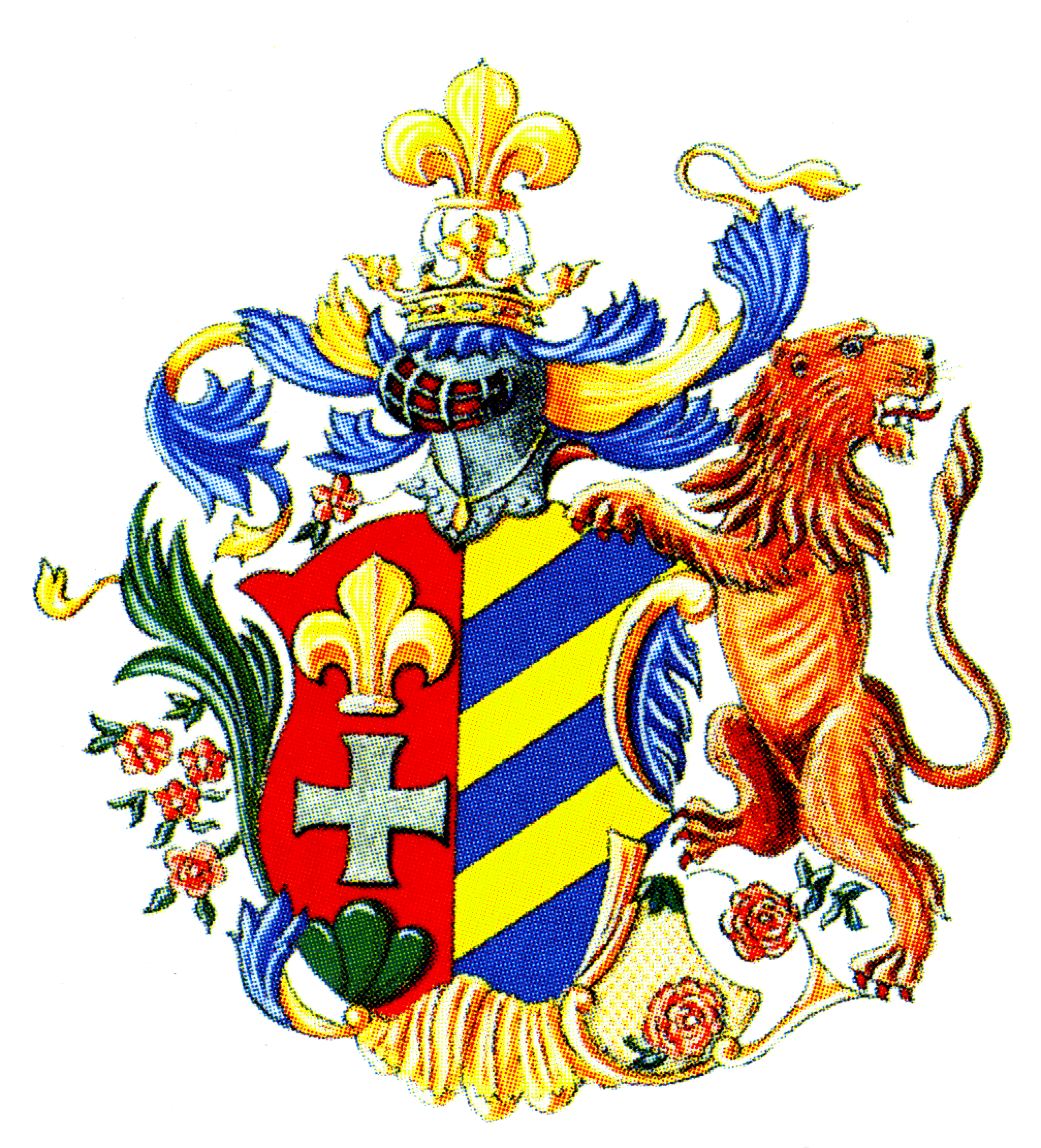
Arms of the Hottinger dynasty. Rodolphe Hottinger is the seventh Baron Hottinger.

Rodolphe Hottinger was born in Paris in 1956 to Henri Hottinger and Josyane Van Laere. He is the eldest of two children and the head of the seventh generation. He attended high school at the Collège Bernard Palissy in the 17th arrondissement of Paris and went on to obtain a university degree at the Académie de Commerce International. After his studies, Rodolphe Hottinger held several trainee and assistant positions at various well-known banking establishments in Paris, London, New York, Hong Kong, and Singapore, namely Coutts & Co., Brown Brothers Harriman, Baring Brothers, Kidder Peabody, and Chemical Bank.

In 1981, Rodolphe Hottinger left Paris for New York to secure and expand the family's financial operations. In doing so, he re-established the Hottinger name in the United States, a presence which dated back to the first half of the 19th century. At that time, Jean-Conrad and Jean-Henri Hottinguer forged an alliance with Heinrich Escher and created the first Hottinger branch in the United States. Heinrich Escher later returned to Switzerland, where his son, Alfred Escher, founded the Zurich Polytechnic School and was also one of the co-founders of the Schweizerische Kreditanstalt, later named Credit Suisse.

== Career ==
In 1982, Rodolphe Hottinger created the brokerage firm Hottinger Bros. in New York, a member of the National Association of Securities Dealers. In 1987, he was instrumental for the creation of the Swiss Helvetia Fund, the first Swiss close-end investment firm listed on the New York Stock Exchange, which deals in equity and equity-linked securities of Swiss companies. That same year, he was named Managing Partner at Hottinger & Cie. in Zurich, a position he would hold for the next twenty-three years. Other positions held during this period include President of the management board of Emba NV, (listed on Euronext until 2007), from 1990 to 2009, and President and CEO of the Swiss Helvetia Fund (listed on the NYSE ) from 1997 to 2009. He rang the closing bell of the New York Stock Exchange on October 3, 2007.

Rodolphe Hottinger was a member of the Board of Directors of AXA RE US from 1983 to 2002, AXA Life and P&C Switzerland from 1998 to 2006 and AXA Winterthur Life and P&C from 2007 to 2012.

After 30 years with the Hottinger Group and 20 years as its CEO, Rodolphe Hottinger now manages La Financière Rodolphe Hottinger. In 2010 he decided to create his own operation to address the specific challenges that financial institutions now face in the aftermath of the 2008 financial crisis.

According to the website of FINMA, the Swiss regulatory body for banks and securities dealers, La Compagnie Financière Rodolphe Hottinger (a wholly own subsidiary of La Financière Rodolphe Hottinger) has discontinued its activities as a security dealer.

== Philosophy ==
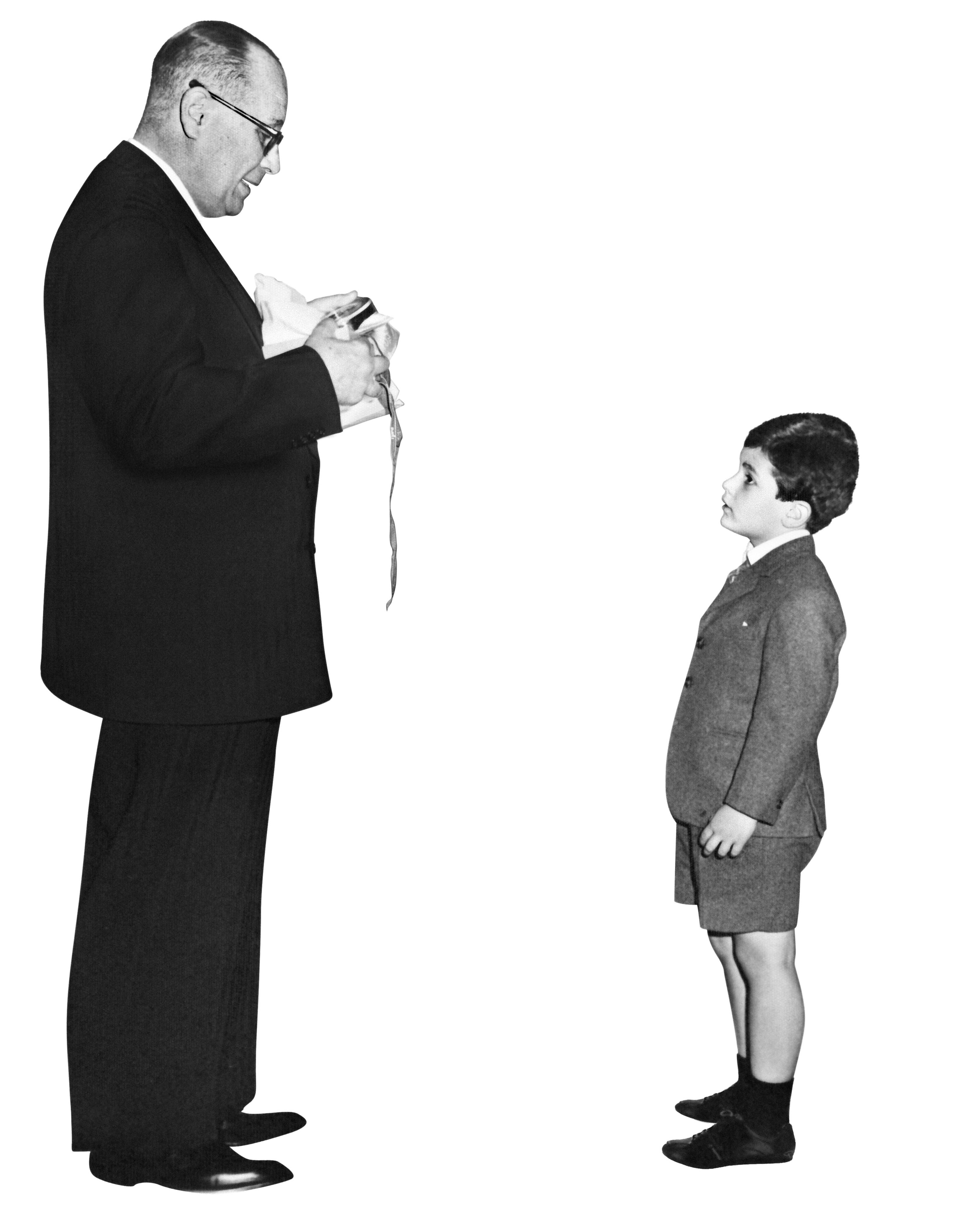
Rodolphe Hottinger with his grandfather, Baron Rodolphe Hottinguer (1902–1985)

Rodolphe Hottinger remains inspired by a speech given by his grandfather, Baron Rodolphe Hottinguer (1902-1985), as Chairman of the EC Banking Federation, at the inaugural meeting of Bankers' Day in Munich on 14 November 1963.

The example of the past should allow for the pursuit of this ancestral occupation of banking. To qualify it, to define it, to anticipate what it might become: therein lies the secret of its future. In the conduct of its forebears and the example they set, our banking family will receive the encouragement to persevere, the intelligence to change and adapt, the character to overcome challenges, and the hope to undertake new ventures.

- Max Gérard, Messieurs Hottinguers et Cie. Banquiers à Paris, Vol. II, p. 783.

== Conferences ==
- Finance Summit September 27, 2011, Geneva

== Articles on Rodolphe Hottinger ==
- Le defi Americain in Banque et Finance, n°112, Nov/Dec 2011.
- Une stratégie internationale volontariste in Banque et Finance, n°93, Sept/Oct 2008.

== Sources ==
- Messieurs Hottinguer Banquiers à Paris by Max Gérard, Vol. I & II, 1968.
- The World of Private Banking (Studies in Banking and Financial History) by Philip Cottrell and Youssef Cassis, with Monika Pohle Fraser and Iain L. Fraser. Ed. Ashgate (ex-Scolar), October 2009. ISBN 1-85928-432-9
