= Hottinger & Cie =

International financial services group

Hottinger Group
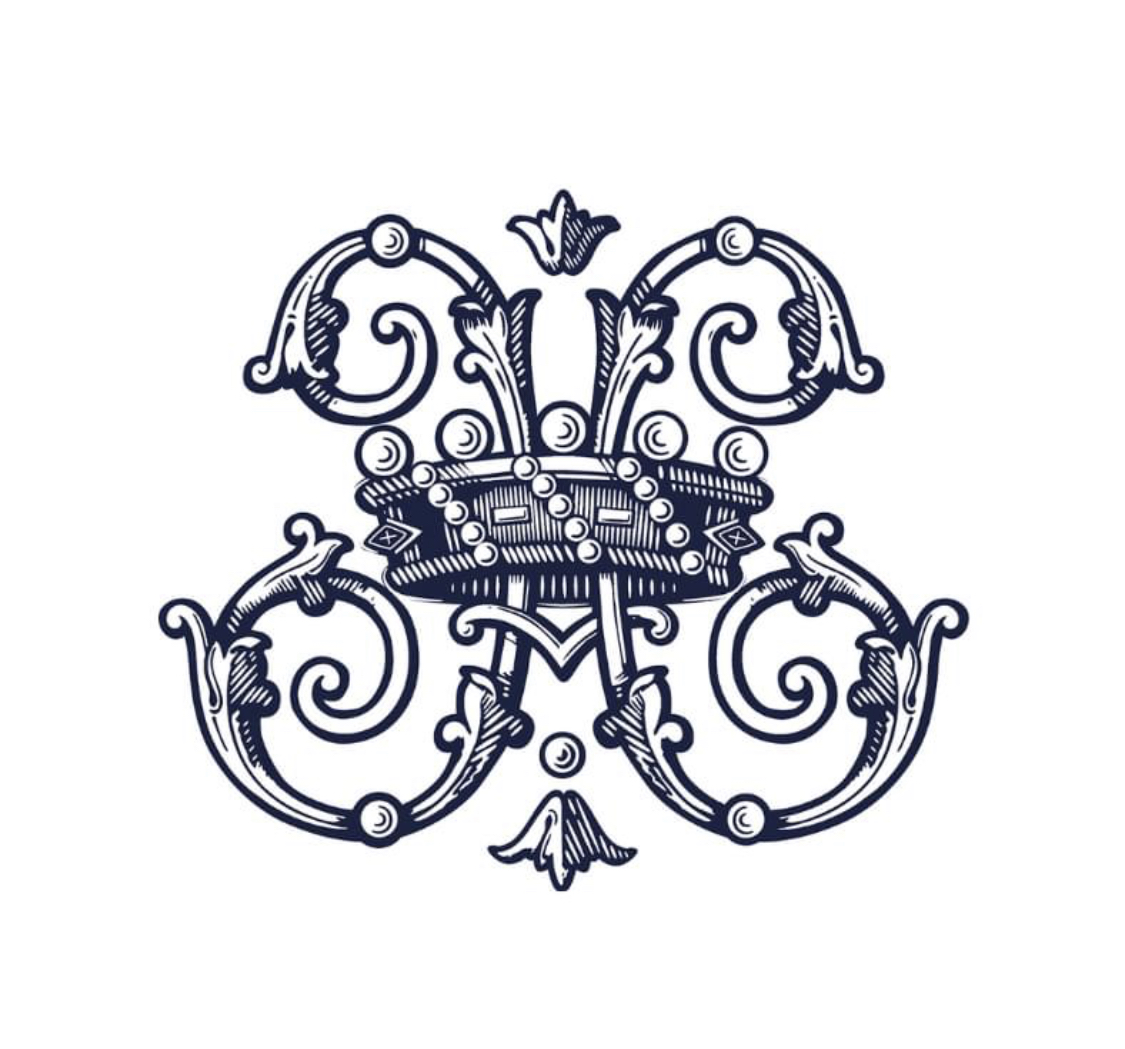
- Type: Private
- Industry: Financial services
- Predecessor: Hottinger & Cie
- Founded: 1 August 1786; 240 years ago
- Founder: Baron Jean Conrad Hottinger
- Headquarters: London, UK
- Number of locations: 4
- Key people: Chair of the Board, Sarah Deaves
- Services: Investment management and private banking
- Owner: Edmond de Rothschild Group, Mark Robertson, Alastair Hunter
- Number of employees: 25-50
- Website: www.hottinger.co.uk

Hottinger Group is an international wealth management business headquartered in London providing family office, Investment banking and other associated financial services. Hottinger is known as one of the first private banks, created on 1 August 1786 by the Hottinguer family.

== History ==
=== Origins ===
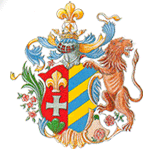
The Hottinger family Swiss coat of arms

The bank Rougemont, Hottinger & Cie was launched in Paris by Jean-Conrad Hottinguer in 1786. The bank was located in the Hôtel de Beaupreaux in front of the Banque de France. The partnership with Denis de Rougemont was effectively ended on 15 October 1790 when Jean-Conrad Hottinger stepped out on his own, launching Hottinger & Cie. In or around 1799 Jean-Conrad added a 'u' to his family name to maintain the correct pronunciation of the name in French.

In 1803, France established a council of fifteen prominent bankers, or members of the Haute Banque. These individuals were known as Regents, with the council of Regents acting as the French central bank for 143 years until it was nationalised in 1946. Jean Conrad was appointed Regent of the Banque de France on 18 August 1803, with a succession of Baron Hottinguers sitting on the council. For the next 133 years, a Hottinger family member was on the Banque de France board.

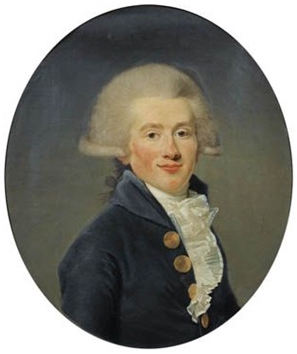
Jean-Conrad Hottinguer

In 1833, Baron Jean–Henri Hottinguer took the helms of "Hottingeur & Cie". In 1848, the bank bought Banque Delessert and moved the family home to the Hôtel Hottinguer on rue de la Baume in Paris. In 1866, Baron Rodolphe Hottinguer took over the Hottinger Bank. In 1920, Henry Hottinger took over his father at the head of the group.

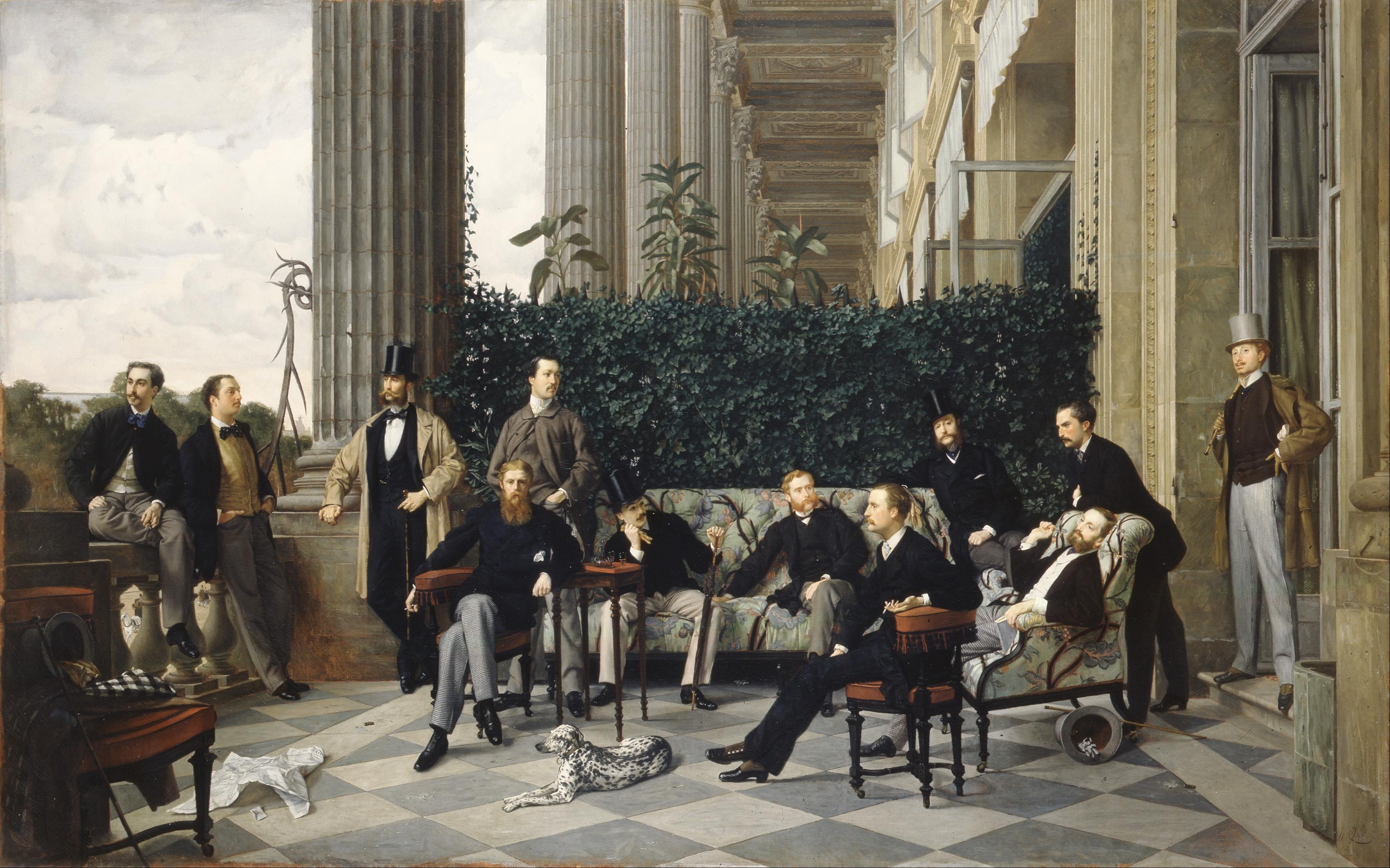
The balcony of the Cercle de la rue Royale in Paris by Tissot. Baron Rodolphe Hottinguer is in the picture, sitting on the sofa, without hat.

=== International development ===
Caisse d'Epargne, the first French savings bank, was created in Paris in 1818 by a group of banks, financiers, social reformers, and philanthropists that included Delessert Bank, Hottinger & Cie, Joseph Marie de Gérando, Jacques Laffitte, the Duke of La Rochefoucauld-Liancourt, James Mayer de Rothschild, and Vital Roux.

The Banque de l'Union Parisienne was founded on 5 January 1904, with initial capital of 40 million francs. Société Générale de Belgique held 15%, with the private Parisian banks of Hottinger, Mirabaud, Neuflize, Mallet and Vernes capitalising this new investment bank.

In 1968, seeking to expand the family's private banking activities, Baron Henri Hottinguer (1934–2015) moved to Zurich to establish a new Swiss division of Hottinger Group, with Hottinger & Cie in Zurich launching on 13 December 1968.

In 1981, Baron Henri Hottinger (1934–2015) sought to further expand the Hottinger Group by launching operations in London, New York, Nassau and Luxembourg, which were independently capitalised and regulated in their respective jurisdictions by the Commission de Surveillance du Secteur Financier (CSSF) in Luxembourg, the Securities and Exchange Commission (SEC) in the US, and the Financial Conduct Authority (FCA) in the UK.

In 1982, Hottinger Group merged its insurance division (Drouot Groupe) with Mutuelles Unies, becoming Mutuelles Unies/Drouot which was subsequently renamed AXA in 1985.

October 1997 saw Credit Suisse take a 70% stake in the French division of Hottinger Group, the original Banque Hottinguer, who changed its name to Credit Suisse Hottinguer. The remaining 30% stake was acquired in 2001 when Credit Suisse exercised its option to take 100% control of the French division.

By 2008, with different branches of the Hottinguer family involved in the ownership and management of Hottinger Group, Baron Henri Hottinger found it necessary to retake control. Further family disagreements followed, resulting in Rodolphe Hottinger resigning his executive positions in 2009 to establish a competitor wealth management business.

In 2015, the Swiss division of Hottinger Group witnessed significant losses related to the fraudulent activities of an external asset management business, which ultimately led to the Swiss division's liquidation. Heritage Bank and Standard Chartered acquired client assets from the appointed liquidator.

=== From bank to family office ===
Following the death of Baron Henri Hottinger in April 2015, his son Frédéric Hottinger inherited the vast majority of his father's estate, in particular a controlling interest in Hottinger Group. Upon receiving his inheritance Frédéric Hottinger began merger discussions with a multi-family office (Archimedes Private Office). The Financial Conduct Authority (FCA) approved the merger of Hottinger and Archimedes on 26 July 2016 with the Hottinger Group maintaining offices in London, Dublin, New York and Geneva.

In 2016 the Luxembourg division of Hottinger Group was sold to Iteram Investments.

In April 2019, the Hottinger Group launched an art consultancy service, Hottinger Art.

Edmond de Rothschild Group announced the sale of their U.K. wealth management business to Hottinger Group on 26 October 2021. The transaction, subject to the UK regulator's consent, would see the clients and staff of Edmond de Rothschild Private Merchant Banking LLP transfer to Hottinger. Connected to this transaction, Edmond de Rothschild acquired a 42.5% stake in Hottinger Group. At the conclusion of the agreement, in late 2021, Hottinger Group had offices in Dublin and Geneva with headquarters in London, and provided services to around 200 families. Following approval from the FCA, in June of 2022, Edmond de Rothschild and Hottinger Group completed their venture.

== Services ==
As a multi-family office, it primarily offers independent wealth consultancy, as well as other financial and non-financial "activities" as needed by clients.

The XYZ Affair was a political and diplomatic scandal which led to the Quasi-War of 1798 between the French and the US. Jean-Conrad Hottinger (known as X), engaged as a French diplomat by the French foreign minister, Charles-Maurice de Talleyrand, led negotiations with an American diplomatic commission who sought to negotiate terms with the French to cease their Naval interdiction of American trade with Great Britain.

In 2013, an external asset management business was involved in an embezzlement scandal. Fabien Gaglio, a private banker and shareholder of the franchise, confessed in January 2013 to the police he ran a Ponzi scheme on his own terms for 15 years, and stated that he had lost all the proceeds of his scheme. Gaglio was sentenced to 5 years in a Luxembourg prison (1/2 on parole) and a €150,000 fine.

== See also ==
- Ottoman Bank
- Bank of France
- Groupe Caisse d'Épargne
