= XYZ Affair =

Diplomatic episode between the US and France (1797–1798)

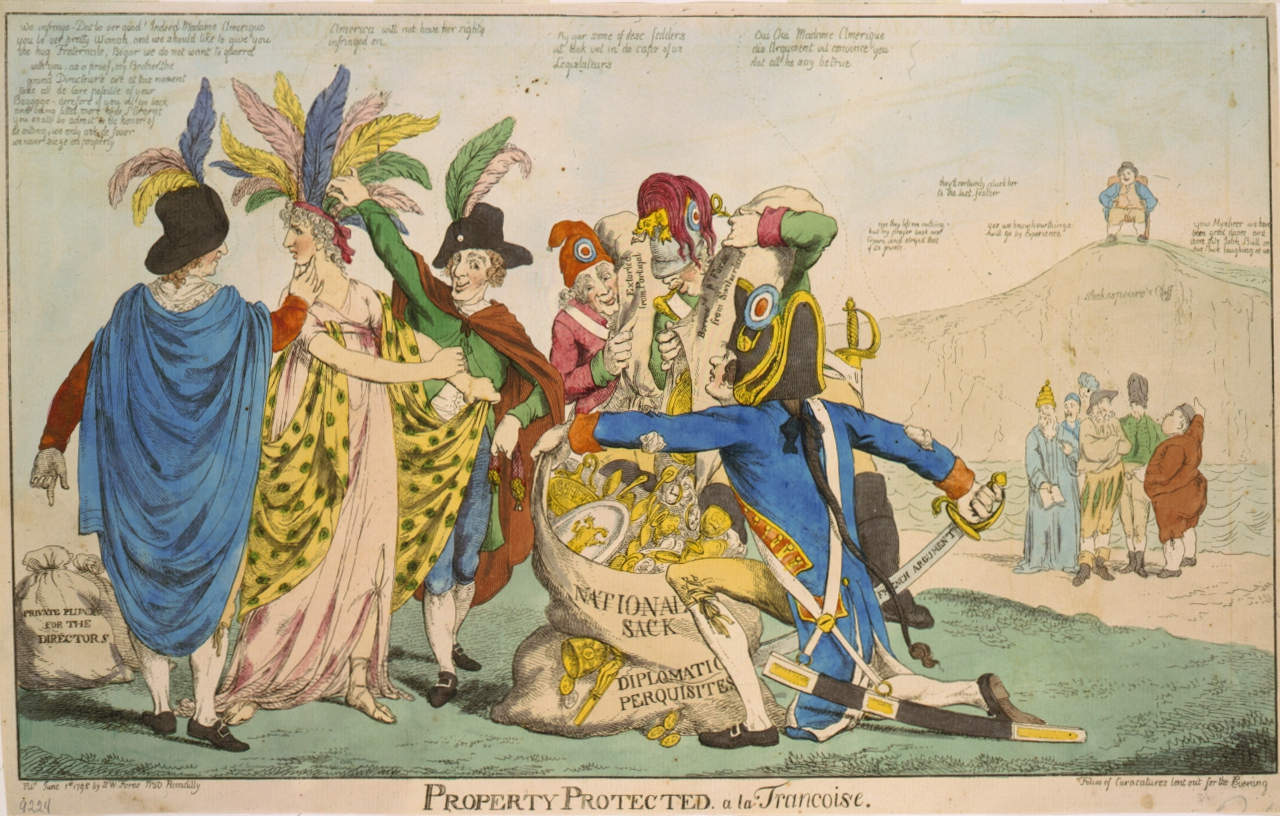
- Political cartoon from 1798 depicting America (the woman) being plundered by the five members of the French Directory.
- Date: July 1797 – October 1798
- Location: Paris, France
- Participants: Charles Cotesworth Pinckney; John Marshall; Elbridge Gerry; Talleyrand
- Outcome: Breakdown of diplomatic relations between the United States and France; Outbreak of the undeclared Quasi-War (1798–1800); Heightened political tensions and passage of the Alien and Sedition Acts in the U.S.

The XYZ Affair was a political and diplomatic episode in 1797 and 1798, early in the presidency of John Adams, involving a confrontation between the United States and Republican France which led to the Quasi-War. The name derives from the substitution of the letters X, Y, and Z for the names of French diplomats Jean-Conrad Hottinguer (X), Pierre Bellamy (Y), and Lucien Hauteval (Z) in documents released by the Adams administration.

An American diplomatic commission was sent to France in July 1797 to negotiate a solution to problems that were threatening to break out into war. The diplomats, Charles Cotesworth Pinckney, John Marshall, and Elbridge Gerry, were approached through informal channels by agents of the French foreign minister, Charles Maurice de Talleyrand-Périgord. Talleyrand demanded bribes and a loan before formal negotiations could begin. Although it was widely known that diplomats from other nations had paid bribes to deal with Talleyrand at the time, the Americans were offended by the demands, and eventually left France without ever engaging in formal negotiations. Gerry, seeking to avoid all-out war, remained for several months after the other two commissioners left. His exchanges with Talleyrand laid groundwork for the eventual end to diplomatic affairs and a start to military hostilities.

The failure of the commission caused a political firestorm in the United States when the commission's dispatches were published. It led to the undeclared Quasi-War (1798–1800). Federalists, who controlled both houses of Congress and held the presidency, took advantage of the national anger to build up the nation's military. They also attacked the Democratic-Republicans for their pro-French stance, and Gerry (a nonpartisan at the time) for what they saw as his role in the commission's failure.

== Background ==
In the wake of the 1789 French Revolution, relations between the new French Republic and U.S. federal government, originally friendly, became strained. In 1792, France and the rest of Europe went to war, a conflict in which President George Washington declared American neutrality. However, both France and Great Britain, the major naval powers in the war, seized ships of neutral powers (including those of the United States) that traded with their enemies. With the Jay Treaty, ratified in 1795, the United States reached an agreement on the matter with Britain that angered members of the Directory that governed France. The French Navy consequently stepped up its efforts to interrupt American trade with Britain. By the end of Washington's presidency in early 1797, the matter was reaching crisis proportions. Shortly after assuming office on March 4, 1797, President John Adams learned that Charles Cotesworth Pinckney had been refused as U.S. minister because of the escalating crisis, and that American merchant ships had been seized in the Caribbean. In response, he called upon Congress to meet and address the deteriorating state of French–American relations during a special session to be held that May. (Note: This special session of the 5th Congress was called in accordance with Article II, Section 3, Clause 3 of the United States Constitution by proclamation of President John Adams on March 25, 1797, and was convened on May 15, 1797.)

Popular opinion in the United States on relations with France was divided along largely political lines: Federalists took a hard line, favoring a defensive buildup but not necessarily advocating war, while Democratic-Republicans expressed solidarity with the republican ideals of the French revolutionaries and did not want to be seen as cooperating with the Federalist Adams administration. Vice President Thomas Jefferson, himself a republican, looked upon Federalists as monarchists who were linked to Britain and therefore hostile to American values.

== Commission to France ==
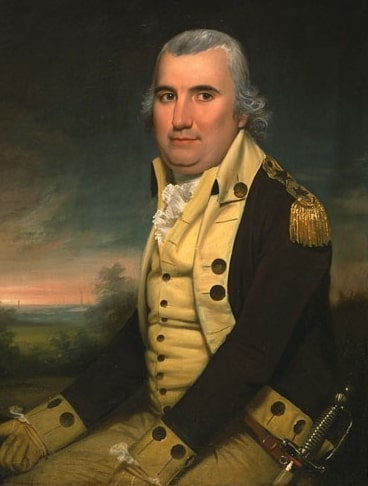
Charles Cotesworth Pinckney headed the American commission.

In late May 1797 Adams met with his cabinet to discuss the situation and to choose a special commission to France. Adams initially proposed that John Marshall and Elbridge Gerry join Pinckney on the commission, but his cabinet objected to the choice of Gerry because he was not a strong Federalist. Francis Dana was chosen instead of Gerry, but he declined to serve, and Adams, who considered Gerry one of the "two most impartial men in America" (he himself being the other), submitted his name to the United States Senate in Dana's stead without consulting his cabinet. Adams, in introducing the matter to Congress, made a somewhat belligerent speech in which he called for a vigorous defense of the nation's neutrality and expansion of the United States Navy, but stopped short of calling for war against France. Congress approved this choice of commissioners, and Adams instructed them to negotiate similar terms to those that had been granted to Britain in the Jay Treaty. The commissioners were also instructed to refuse loans, but to be flexible in the arrangement of payment terms for financial matters. Marshall left for Europe in mid-July to join Pinckney, with Gerry following a few weeks later. The political divisions in the commission's makeup were reflected in their attitudes toward the negotiations: Marshall and Pinckney, both Federalists, distrusted the French, while Gerry (who was then opposed to political parties) was willing to be flexible and unhurried in dealing with them.

The French Republic, established in 1792 at the height of the French Revolution, was by 1797 governed by a bicameral legislative assembly, with a five-member French Directory acting as the national executive. (Note: French Constitution of 1795.) The Directory was undergoing both internal power struggles and struggles with the Council of Five Hundred, the lower chamber of the legislature. Ministerial changes took place in the first half of 1797, including the selection in July of Charles Maurice de Talleyrand as foreign minister. Talleyrand, who had recently spent a few years in the United States, was openly concerned about the establishment of closer ties between the U.S. and Britain. The Directory, generally not well-disposed to American interests, became notably more hostile to them in September 1797, when an internal coup propelled several anti-Americans into power. These leaders, and Talleyrand, viewed President Adams as hostile to their interests, but did not think that there was significant danger of war. In part based on advice imparted to French diplomats by Jefferson, Talleyrand decided to adopt a measured, slow pace to the negotiations.

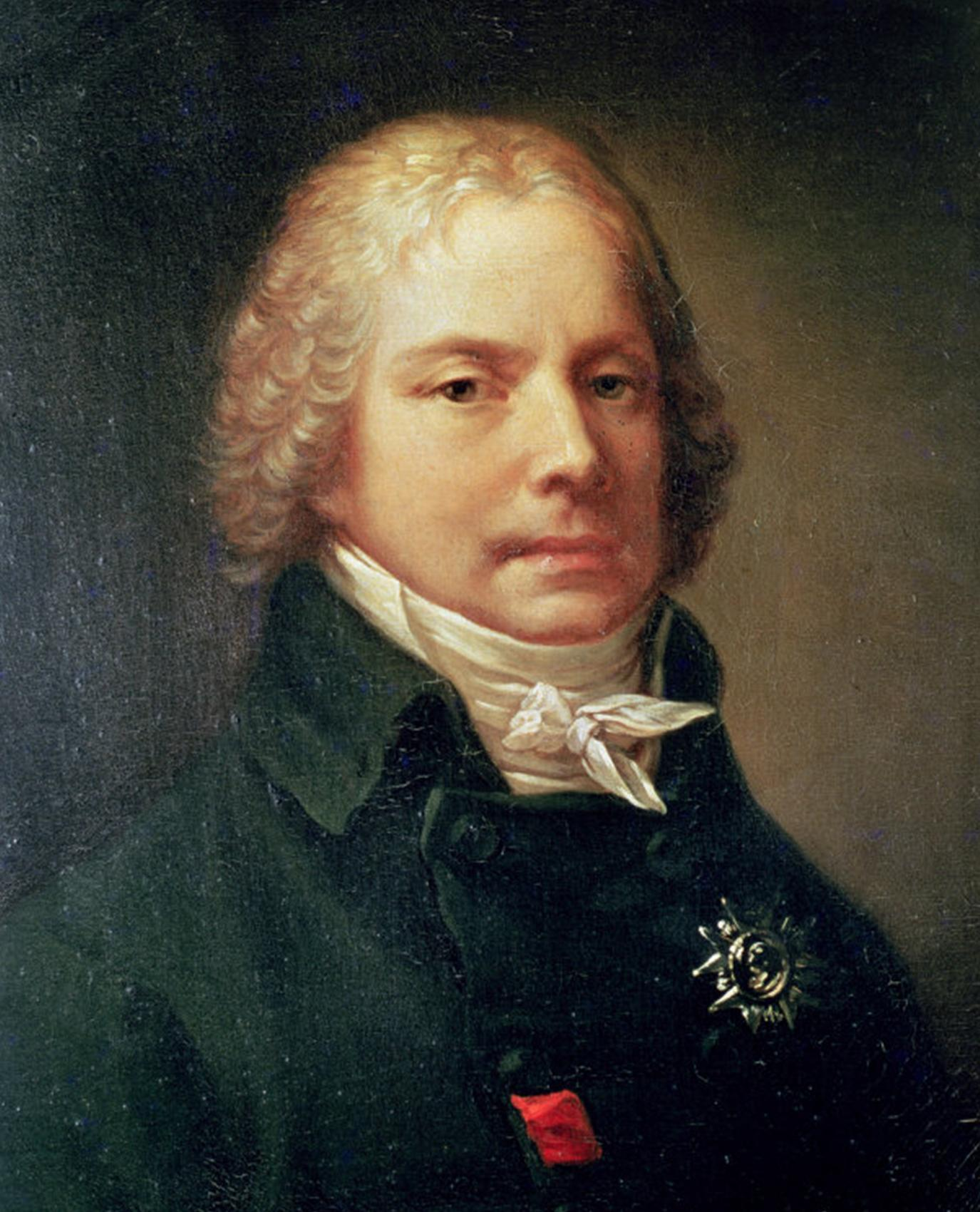
French Foreign Minister Talleyrand

The American commission arrived in Paris in early October, and immediately requested a meeting with Talleyrand. After an initial brief meeting (in which Talleyrand only provisionally accepted the commissioners' credentials), a longer meeting was held a week later. Talleyrand sought from the commissioners an explanation for the speech Adams had made in May, which had angered Directory members; his motivation was to determine how favorably the commissioners were disposed to the negotiations. If they responded in an unfavorable manner, the Directory would refuse to accept their credentials. The commissioners first learned of Talleyrand's expected demand on October 14 through an indirect channel. They decided that no explanation would be given for Adams' speech.

=== Initial meetings ===
What followed were a series of meetings that took place outside formal diplomatic channels. On October 17, Nicholas Hubbard, an Englishman working for a Dutch bank used by the Americans (and who came to be identified as "W" in the published papers), notified Pinckney that Baron Jean-Conrad Hottinguer, whom Hubbard described only as a man of honor, wished to meet with him. Pinckney agreed, and the two men met the next evening. Hottinguer (who was later identified as "X") relayed a series of French demands, which included a large loan to the French government and the payment of a £50,000 bribe to Talleyrand. Pinckney relayed these demands to the other commissioners, and Hottinguer repeated them to the entire commission, which curtly refused the demands, even though it was widely known that diplomats from other nations had paid bribes to deal with Talleyrand. Hottinguer then introduced the commission to Pierre Bellamy ("Y"), whom he represented as being a member of Talleyrand's inner circle. Bellamy expounded in detail on Talleyrand's demands, including the expectation that "you must pay a great deal of money". He even proposed a series of purchases (at inflated prices) of currency as a means by which such money could be clandestinely exchanged. The commissioners offered to send one of their number back to the United States for instructions, if the French would suspend their seizures of American shipping; the French negotiators refused.

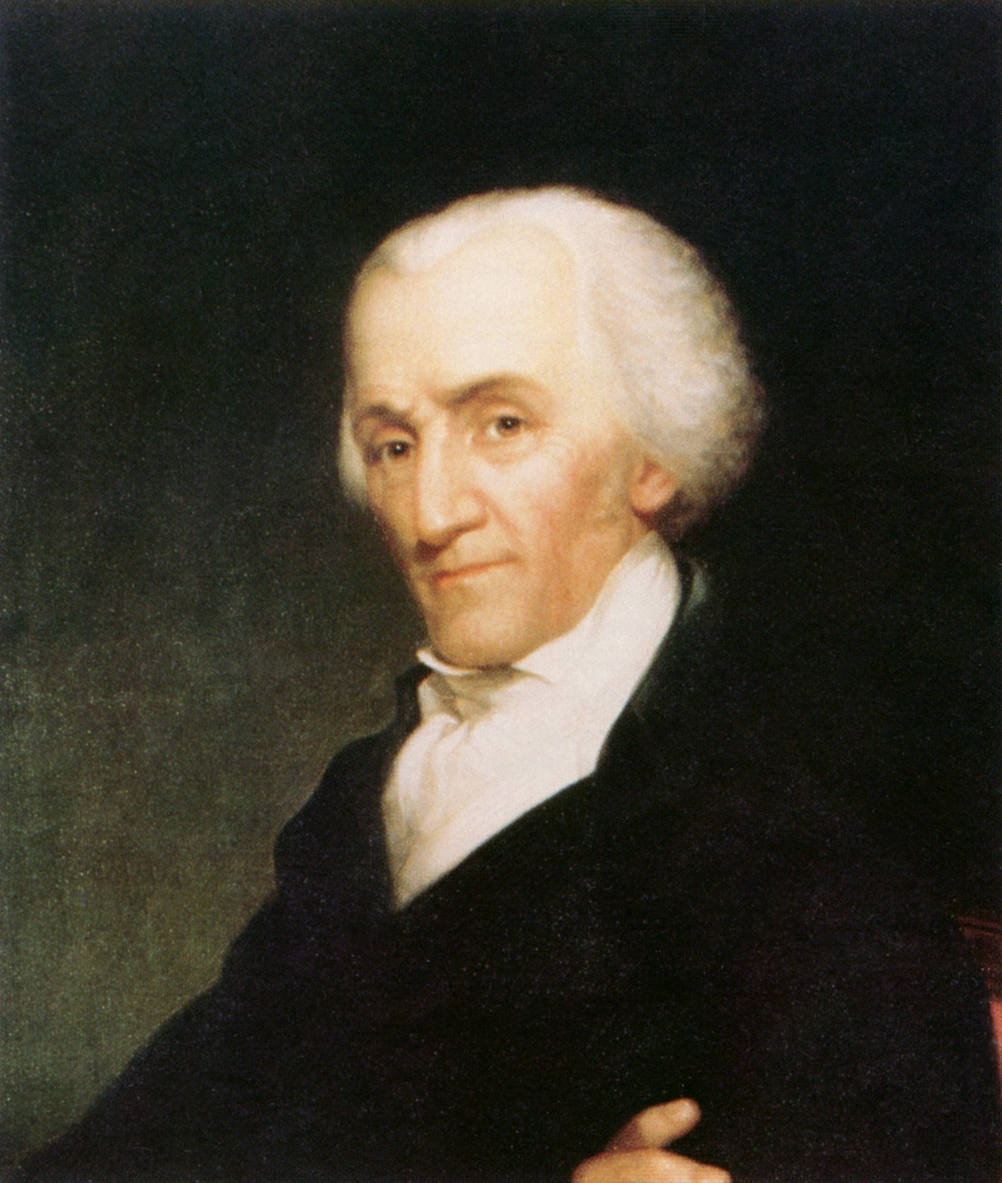
Elbridge Gerry

Not long after this standoff, Talleyrand sent Lucien Hauteval ("Z") to meet with Elbridge Gerry. The two men knew each other, having met in Boston in 1792. Hauteval assured Gerry of Talleyrand's sincerity in seeking peace, and encouraged him to keep the informal negotiations open. He reiterated the demands for a loan and bribe.

A week later (notably after the signing of the Treaty of Campo Formio, which ended the five-year War of the First Coalition between France and most of the other European powers), Hottinguer and Bellamy again met with the commission, and repeated their original demands, accompanied by threats of potential war, since France was at least momentarily at peace in Europe. Pinckney's response was famous: "No, no, not a sixpence!" The commissioners decided on November 1 to refuse further negotiations by informal channels. Publication of dispatches describing this series of meetings would form the basis for the later political debates in the United States.

=== Later negotiations ===
The commissioners soon discovered that only unofficial channels were open to them. Over the next several months, Talleyrand sent a series of informal negotiators to meet with and influence the commissioners. Some of the informal avenues were closed down (Gerry, for instance, informed Hauteval that they could no longer meet, since Hauteval had no formal authority), and Talleyrand finally appeared in November 1797 at a dinner, primarily to castigate the Americans for their unwillingness to accede to the demand for a bribe.

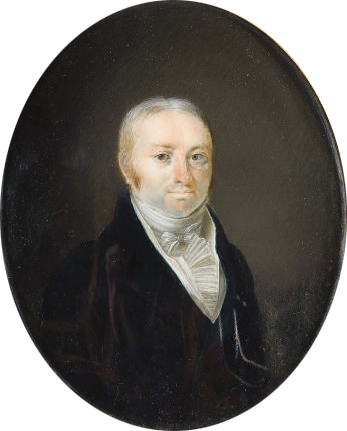
Jean-Conrad Hottinguer

In late November, Talleyrand began maneuvering to separate Gerry from the other commissioners. He extended a "social" dinner invitation to Gerry, which the latter, seeking to maintain communications, planned to attend. The matter heightened distrust of Gerry by Marshall and Pinckney, who sought guarantees that Gerry would limit any representations and agreements he might consider. Despite seeking to refuse informal negotiations, all of the commissioners ended up having private meetings with some of Talleyrand's negotiators.

The commissioners eventually divided over the issue of whether to continue informal negotiations, with the Federalists Marshall and Pinckney opposed, and Gerry in favor. This division was eventually clear to Talleyrand, who told Gerry in January 1798 that he would no longer deal with Pinckney. In February, Talleyrand gained approval from the Directory for a new bargaining position, and he maneuvered to exclude Marshall from the negotiations as well. The change in strategy alarmed a number of American residents of Paris, who reported the growing possibility of war. Around this time Gerry, at Talleyrand's insistence, began keeping secret from the other commissioners the substance of their meetings.

John Marshall

All three commissioners met with Talleyrand informally in March, but it was clear that the parties were at an impasse. This appeared to be the case despite Talleyrand's agreement to drop the demand for a loan. Both sides prepared statements to be sent across the Atlantic stating their positions, and Marshall and Pinckney, frozen out of talks that Talleyrand would only conduct with Gerry, left France in April. Their departure was delayed due to a series of negotiations over the return of their passports; in order to obtain diplomatic advantage, Talleyrand sought to force Marshall and Pinckney to formally request their return (which would allow him to later claim that they broke off negotiations). Talleyrand eventually gave in, formally requesting their departure. Gerry, although he sought to maintain unity with his co-commissioners, was told by Talleyrand that if he left France the Directory would declare war. Gerry remained behind, protesting the "impropriety of permitting a foreign government to [choose] the person who should negotiate." He however remained optimistic that war was unrealistic, writing to William Vans Murray, the American minister to The Netherlands, that "nothing but madness" would cause the French to declare war.

Gerry resolutely refused to engage in further substantive negotiations with Talleyrand, agreeing only to stay until someone with more authority could replace him, and wrote to President Adams requesting assistance in securing his departure from Paris. Talleyrand eventually sent representatives to The Hague to reopen negotiations with William Vans Murray, and Gerry finally returned home in October 1798.

== Reaction in the United States ==
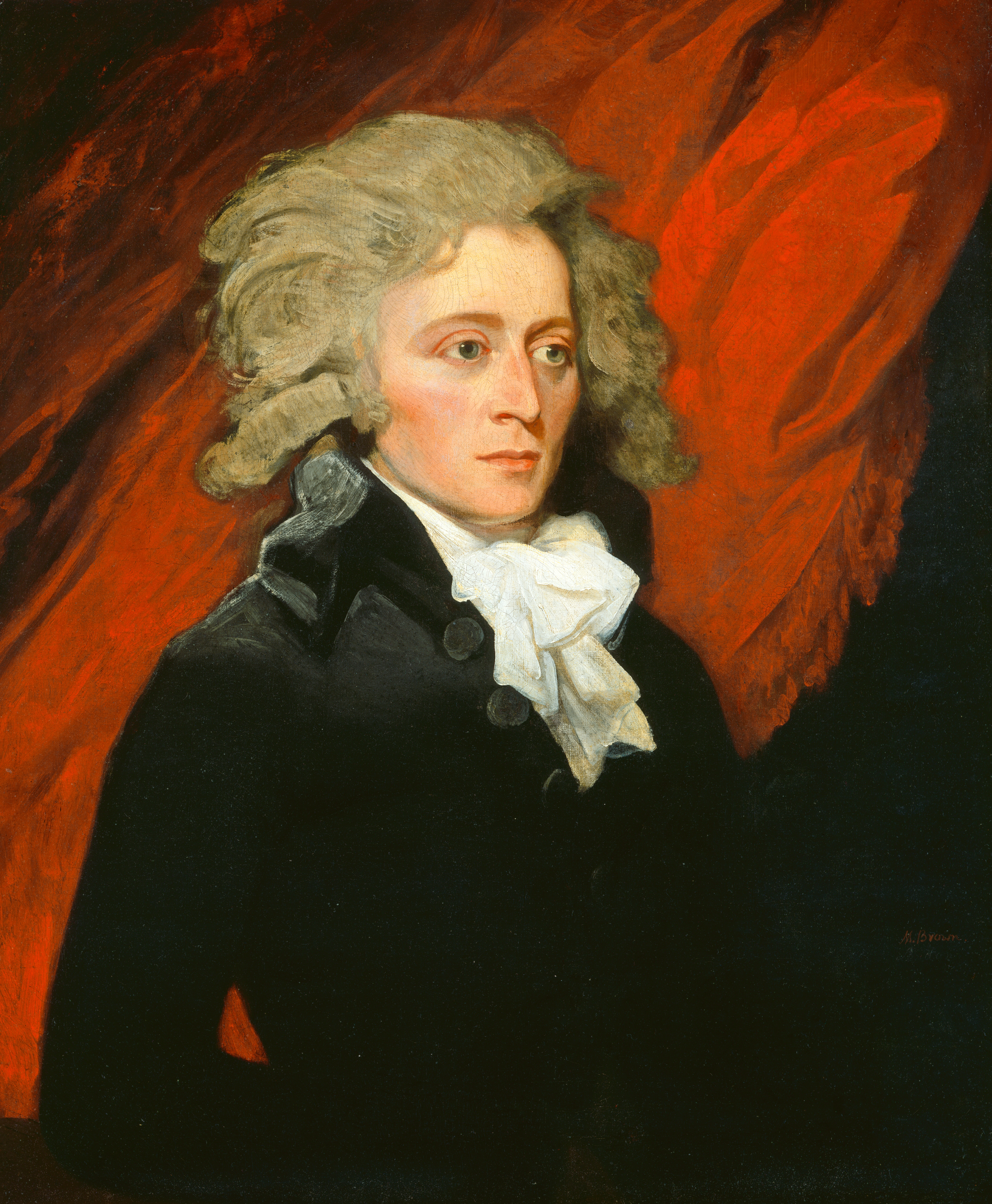
William Vans Murray

While the American diplomats were in Europe, President Adams considered his options in the event of the commission's failure. His cabinet urged that the nation's military be strengthened, including the raising of a 20,000-man army and the acquisition or construction of ships of the line for the navy. He had no substantive word from the commissioners until March 1798, when the first dispatches revealing the French demands and negotiating tactics arrived. The commission's apparent failure was duly reported to Congress, although Adams kept secret the mistreatment (lack of recognition and demand for a bribe) of the diplomats, seeking to minimize a warlike reaction. His cabinet was divided on how to react: the general tenor was one of hostility toward France, with Attorney General Charles Lee and Secretary of State Timothy Pickering arguing for a declaration of war. Democratic-Republican leaders in Congress, believing Adams had exaggerated the French position because he sought war, united with hawkish Federalists to demand the release of the commissioners' dispatches. On March 20, Adams turned them over, with the names of some of the French actors redacted and replaced by the letters W, X, Y, and Z. The use of these disguising letters led the business to immediately become known as the "XYZ Affair."

The release of the dispatches produced exactly the response Adams feared. Federalists called for war, and Democratic-Republicans were left without an effective argument against them, having miscalculated the reason for Adams' secrecy. Despite those calls, Adams steadfastly refused to ask Congress for a formal war declaration. Congress nonetheless authorized the acquisition of twelve frigates, and made other appropriations to increase military readiness; it also, on July 7, 1798, voted to nullify (Note: Text: Act of July 7, 1798, ch. 67, 1 Stat. 578) the 1778 Treaty of Alliance with France, (Note: Text: Act of February 6, 1778, 8 Stat. 6) and two days later authorized attacks on French warships.

=== Partisan responses ===
Federalists used the dispatches to question the loyalty of pro-French Democratic-Republicans; this attitude contributed to the passage of the Alien and Sedition Acts, restricting the movements and actions of foreigners, and limiting speech critical of the government. Federalists were otherwise divided on the question of war, and the Democratic-Republicans painted hawkish Federalists as warmongers seeking to undermine the republic by military means.

At a banquet honoring the return of John Marshall in 1798, Robert Goodloe Harper of South Carolina, then leader of Federalists in the United States House of Representatives, gave a toast. "Millions for defense but not one cent for tribute" became a popular Federalist slogan as the party won more seats in the elections of 1798-99.

Elbridge Gerry was placed in a difficult position upon his return to the United States. Federalists, spurred by John Marshall's accounts of their disagreements, criticized him for abetting the breakdown of the negotiations. These bitterly harsh and partisan comments turned Gerry against the Federalists, and he eventually ended up joining with the Democratic-Republicans in 1800.

== Political reaction in France ==
When news reached France of the publication of the dispatches and the ensuing hostile reaction, the response was one of fury. Talleyrand was called to the Directory to account for his role in the affair. He denied all association with the informal negotiators, and enlisted the assistance of Gerry in exposing the agents whose names had been redacted, a charade Gerry agreed to participate in. In exchange Talleyrand confirmed privately to Gerry that the agents were in fact in his employ, and that he was, contrary to statements made to the Directory, interested in pursuing reconciliation. President Adams later wrote that Talleyrand's confession to Gerry was significant in his decision to continue efforts to maintain peace. Gerry, in his private report on the affair to Adams in 1799, claimed credit for maintaining the peace, and for influencing significant changes in French policy that lessened the hostilities and eventually brought a peace treaty.

The warlike attitude of the United States and the start of the Quasi-War (a naval war between the two countries that was fought primarily in the Caribbean) convinced Talleyrand that he had miscalculated in his dealings with the commissioners. In response to the diplomatic overtures he made to William Vans Murray in The Hague, President Adams sent negotiators to France in 1799 who eventually negotiated an end to hostilities with the Convention of 1800 (whose negotiations were managed in part by Marshall, then Secretary of State) in September 1800. This agreement was made with First Consul Napoleon Bonaparte, who had overthrown the Directory in the Coup of 18 Brumaire in November 1799, and it was ratified by the United States Senate in December 1801.

== See also ==
- Timeline of United States diplomatic history
