= Johann Heinrich Heidegger =

Swiss theologian (1633–1698)

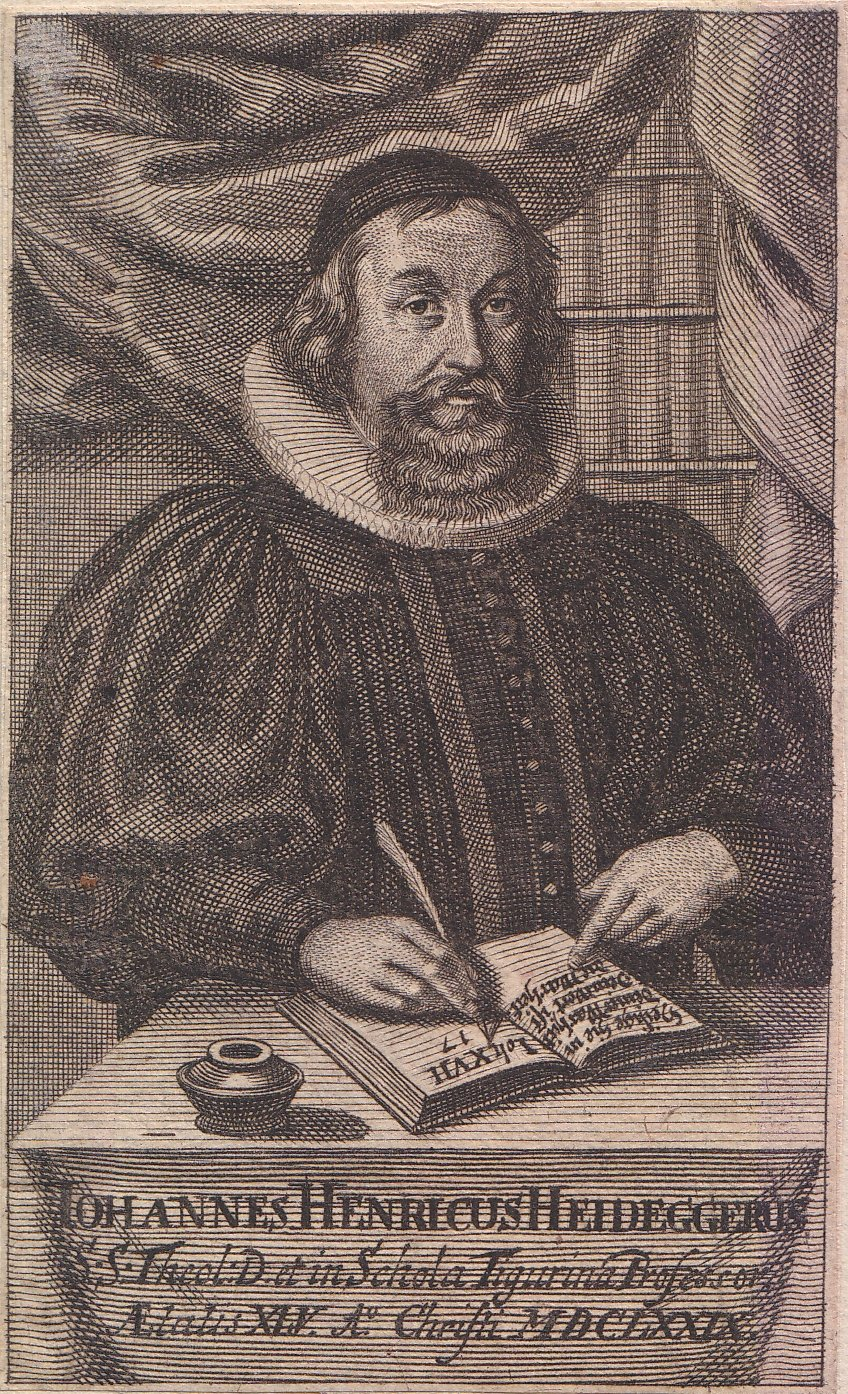

Johann Heinrich Heidegger (July 1, 1633 – July 18, 1698), Swiss theologian, was born at Bäretswil, in the Canton of Zürich.

He studied at Marburg and at Heidelberg, where he became the friend of J. L. Fabricius, and was appointed professor extraordinarius of Hebrew and later of philosophy. In 1659, he was called to Steinfurt to fill the chair of dogmatics and ecclesiastical history, and in the same year he became doctor of theology of Heidelberg.

In 1660 he revisited Switzerland and, after marrying Elisabeth von Duno, he travelled in the following year to Holland, where he made the acquaintance of Johannes Cocceius. He returned in 1665 to Zürich, where he was elected professor of moral philosophy at the University of Zurich. Two years later he succeeded Johann Heinrich Hottinger, in the chair of theology at the University, which he occupied until his death, having declined an invitation in 1669 to succeed Cocceius at Leiden, as well as a call to Groningen.

Heidegger was the principal author of the Formula Consensus Helvetica in 1675, which was designed to unite the Swiss Reformed churches, but had an opposite effect. Wilhelm Gass describes him as the most notable of the Swiss theologians of the time.

His writings are largely controversial, though without being bitter, and are in great part levelled against the Roman Catholic Church.

== Major works ==
- De historia sacra patriarcharum exercitationes selectae (1667–1671)
- Dissertatio de Peregrinationibus religiosis (1670)
- De ratione studiorum, opuscula aurea, &c. (1670)
- Historia papatus (1684; under the name Nicander von Hohenegg)
- Manuductio in viam concordiae Protestantium ecclesiasticae (1686)
- Tumulus concilii Tridentini (1690)
- Exercitationes biblicae (1700), with a life of the author prefixed
- Corpus theologiae Christianae (1700, edited by J. H. Schweizer)
- Ethicae Christianae elementa (1711)
- Life of J. H. Hottinger (1667)
- Life of J. L. Fabricius (1698)

His autobiography appeared in 1698, under the title Historia vitae J. H. Heideggeri.

Heidegger's Handbook of the Bible is currently being translated by From Reformation to Reformation Translations, and is available online.
