= Johann Jakob Hottinger (historian) =

Swiss historian (1783–1860)

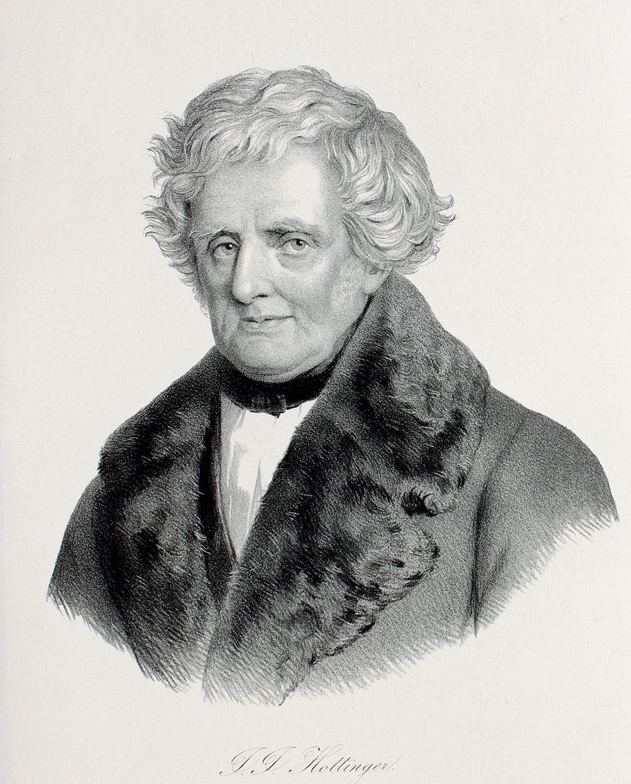
Johann Jakob Hottinger

Johann Jakob Hottinger (18 May 1783, in Zürich – 17 May 1860, in Zürich) was a Swiss historian. He was a great-grandson of philologist Johann Heinrich Hottinger (1620–1667).

He studied theology at the Carolinum in Zürich, receiving his ordination in 1804. Afterwards, he taught classes in an upper Töchterschule and at an art school in Zürich. In 1833 he became an associate professor, then from 1844 to 1859, was a full professor of history at the University of Zürich.

== Selected works ==
Following the death of Robert Glutz-Blotzheim, he continued the work on Johannes von Müller's multi-volume Geschichten schweizerischer Eidgenossenschaft ("History of the Swiss Confederation"). With Hans Heinrich Vögeli, he published an edition of Heinrich Bullinger's Reformationsgeschichte (3 volumes, 1838–40). His biography of Ulrich Zwingli, Huldreich Zwingli und seine Zeit, was translated into English and published as: The life and times of Ulric Zwingli (1856). Other noted works by Hottinger are:

- Arnold von Winkelried; ein vaterländisches Schauspiel in vier Aufzügen, 1810 – Arnold von Winkelried; a patriotic drama in four acts.
- Vorlesungen über die Geschichte des Untergangs der schweizerischen Eidgenossenschaft der dreizehn Orte und der Umbildung derselben in eine helvetische Republik, 1844 – Lectures on the history of the downfall of the Swiss confederation of the thirteen cantons and the transformation thereof into a Helvetic Republic.
- Der staatshaushalt der schweizerischen eidsgenossenschaft und ihrer einzelnen republiken, 1847 – The state budget of the Swiss confederation and its individual republics.
- Geschichte der Republik Zürich (with Johann Kaspar Bluntschli, 1847) – History of the Republic of Zürich.
- Hans Conrad Escher von der Linth, charakterbild eines republikaners, 1852 – Hans Conrad Escher von der Linth, character study of a Republican.
