= Baron Jean-Conrad Hottinguer =

First Baron Hottinguer

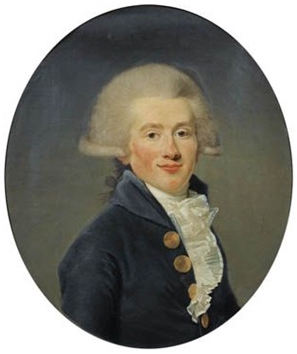
Jean-Conrad Hottinguer

Baron Jean-Conrad Hottinguer (15 February 1764, Zurich – 12 September 1841, Castle Piple, Boissy-Saint-Léger) was a Swiss-born Protestant French banker who later became a Baron of the French Empire.

== Biography ==
=== Career ===
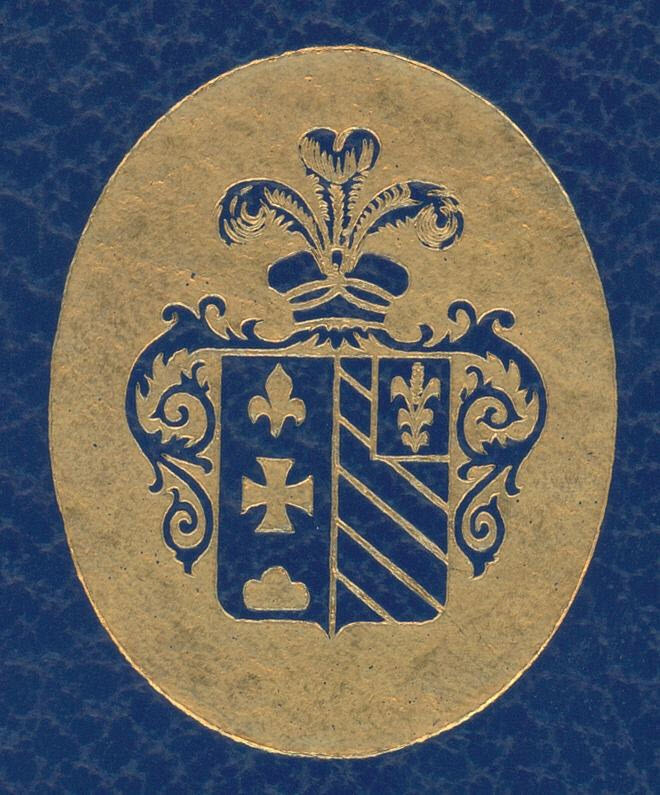
Baron Hottinguer Coat of Arms

In 1784, Hottinguer left the city of Zurich to go pursue a business career in Paris. Due to the work of Jean-Conrad, the name Hottinger appeared under the heading of “Bankers” in the Almanach Royal de France in 1784. During the turbulent years of the French Revolution, banking and trade associations were closed down to be reborn later on under the Directoire. Hottinguer left France during this troublesome period and traveled around Europe and America. He met his future wife Martha Redwood in London, the granddaughter of the founder of the Redwood Library and Athenaeum in Newport and married her on 24 August 1793. During this time, he made an array of contacts, and set up a useful business network around the world. This resulted in a number of fruitful commercial and business relationships, including the Bishop of Autun, Charles Maurice de Talleyrand-Périgord.

After many years of traveling, Hottinguer finally returned to France in 1796 to continue working as a French banker. Business recommenced at Messieurs Hottinguer & Cie in Paris once the Revolution ended. The French economy was once again able to function properly when banking and trading had resumed. Hottinguer & Cie became intimately involved in financial and trade industries in France, Switzerland and many other areas of the world thanks to the work of Hottinguer.

In the late 18th century, Hottinguer was one of the French agents involved in the XYZ Affair, a much-publicized diplomatic scandal between France and the United States.

In the beginning of the 19th century, a family friend and associate, Henri Escher, established the first Hottinger representative office in America. His son, Alfred Escher, founded Credit Suisse, the École Polytechnique of Zurich, and the Gotthard Rail Company before being made President of the national council. For his achievements, the city of Zürich recognizes him with a statue.

In 1803, Hottinguer was appointed as a founding member of The Board of Governors for The Banque de France. He then went on to become a member of the general Council of trade and then president of the Paris Chamber of Commerce and Industry. On 19 September 1810 he was made a Baron of the French Empire. This hereditary title would pass to the oldest son of each generation.

Hottinger later became interested in the insurance industry. In the first year that the insurance industry was open to bankers, he created the first Compagnie Royale D`Assurances. In 1818, he joined forces with Benjamin Delessert to create the Caisse d'Epargne et de Prévoyance de Paris, France's first savings bank. Jean-Conrad died in 1841 and was later succeeded by his son Jean-Henri Hottinguer.

== See also ==
- Hottinguer Family
- Hottinger Group

Preceded by Created	Baron Hottinguer; 1810-1841	Succeeded by Baron Jean-Henri Hottinguer
