= Johann Jakob Hottinger (theologian) =

Swiss theologian (1652–1735)

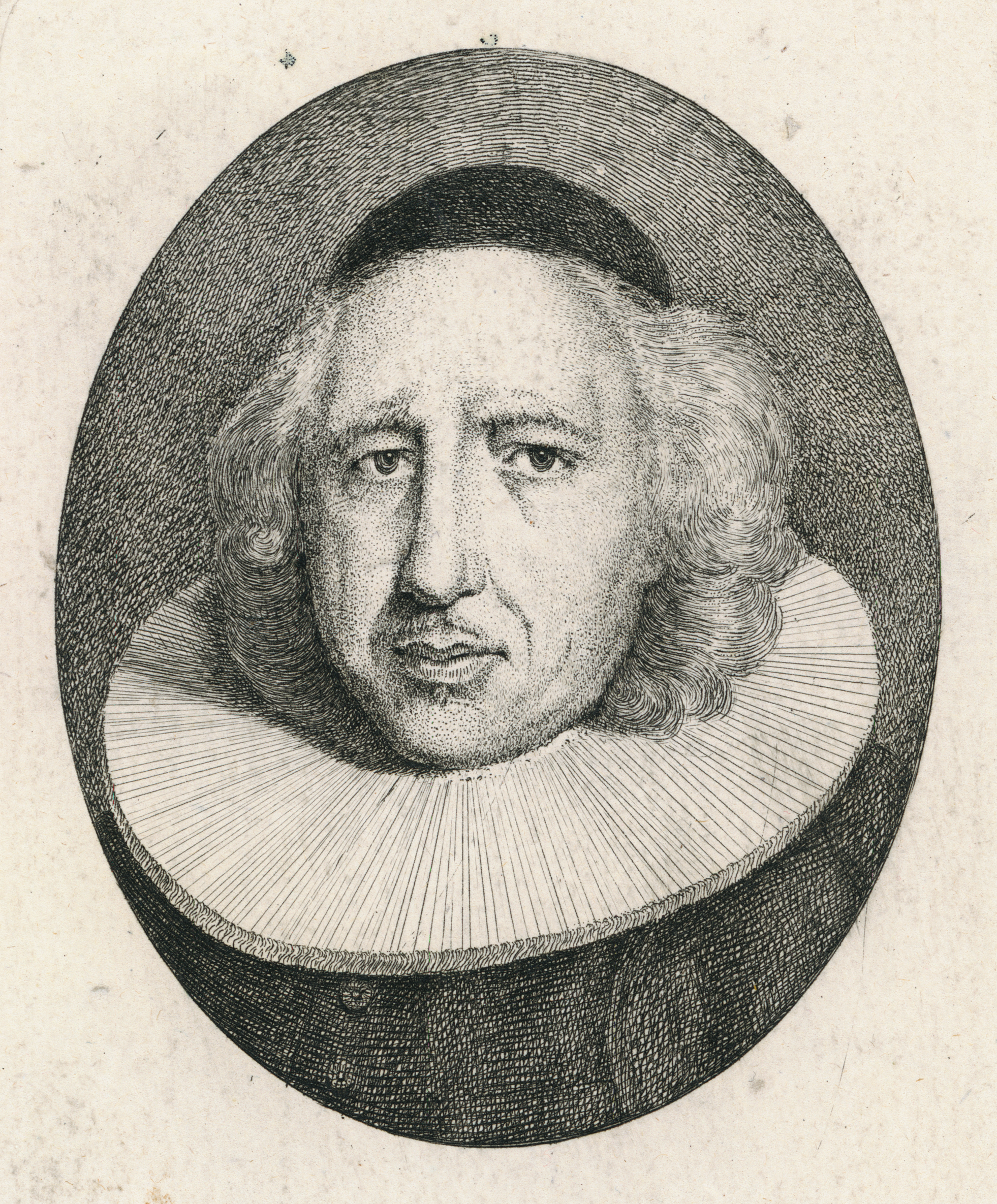

Johann Jakob Hottinger (1 December 1652 – 18 December 1735) was a Swiss theologian.

== Biography ==
He was born in Zürich, the son of the Swiss philologist and theologian Johann Heinrich Hottinger. He studied theology at the Carolinum in Zürich, and also in Basel and Geneva. In 1676 he received his ordination, then in 1680 became a pastor in Stallikon. In 1686 he was named deacon at the Grossmünster in Zürich, where in 1698 he succeeded Johann Heinrich Heidegger as professor of theology. He died in Zürich, aged 83.

== Works ==
He was the author of numerous historical and polemical writings (over 100 publications).

- Helvetische Kirchengeschichte (4 volumes, 1698–1729) – A work against Roman Catholicism.
