= Rodolphe Hottinguer (1902–1985) =

Fifth Baron Hottinguer

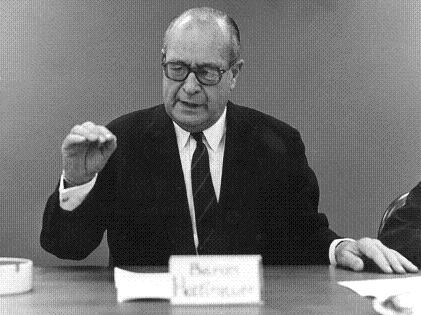

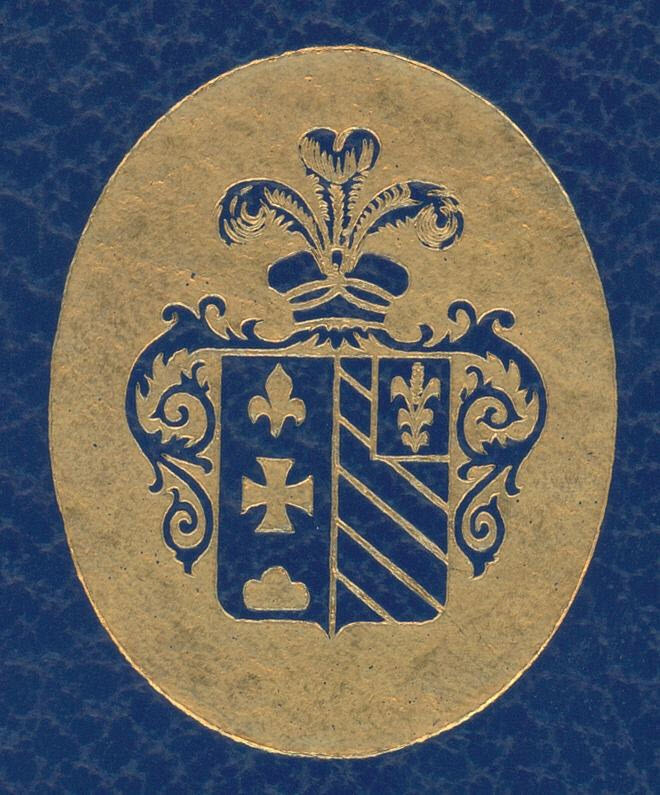
Baron Hottinguer Coat of Arms

Baron Rodolphe Hottinguer (1902–1985) was the fifth Baron of Hottinguer.

== Biography ==
=== Early life and education ===
Born on 16 October 1902, he was the elder son of Baron Henri Hottinguer (1868-1943) and Marian Munroe. He earned a Diploma from École supérieure des sciences économiques et commerciales in Paris, then entered the Artillery School of Fontainebleau in 1922. He left in 1923 as a lieutenant.

In 1925, he embarked on a voyage, crossing the Atlantic Ocean; he visited Rio de Janeiro, Buenos Aires, Valparaíso, Santiago, La Paz, then Havana and New York City.

=== Career ===
Rodolphe becomes partners with Hottinger & Cie on 1 April 1926. Three years later he became administrator of the Company for general insurances. Later he became President and occupied that position until the company's nationalization in 1947. It has long been a tradition of the Hottinguer family to play an active role in consideration of the major questions of national and international economics and finance, Baron Rodolphe Hottinguer continued his tradition, occupying, in addition to his role in the bank, important posts including Vice-Chairman of the Paris Chamber of Commerce, Chairman of the International Chamber of Commerce, Chairman of the European Banking Federation and, between 1943 and 1979, Chairman of the French Banking Association.

Hottinger & Cie took part in the creation of the Insurance company Drouot, one of the origin of the group AXA. It is in this time that he was made Chairman of the International Chamber of Commerce 1971-1973.

=== Marriage and children ===
Rodolphe and his wife née Odette Basset had four children. Henri (1934-2015), Caroline (1936-2008), Paul (1942), Véronique (1943).

His son Henri was the 6th Baron Hottinguer. He married Josiane Van Laer, and had two sons Rodolphe (1956) the seventh Baron Hottinguer and Frédéric.

Caroline, first married Count Christian de Pourtalès with whom she had three children: Laure (1958), Max (1961) & Paul (1961). She divorced and got married with Marquis du Vivier.

Paul, first married with Christine Robinet de Plas with whom he had two children: Laetitia (1966) and Philippe (1969). From a third marriage, he also has one daughter: Mélanie.

Véronique is married with Richard Bowdler-Raynar. They have two children: William (1965) and Jonathan (1970).

=== See also ===
- Hottinguer Family
- Hottinger Group

=== Sources ===
- Messieurs Hottinguer Banquiers à Paris, Max Gérard, 1968, Tome Premier.
- Capitals of Capital, A History of International Financial Centres, 1780–2005, ISBN 978-0-521-84535-9 / ISBN 0-521-84535-1

| Preceded by Baron Henri Hottinguer (1868-1943) | Baron of Hottinguer; 1943-1985 | Succeeded by Baron Henri Hottinguer (1934-2015) |
