= Baron Jean–Henri Hottinguer =

Second Baron Hottinguer

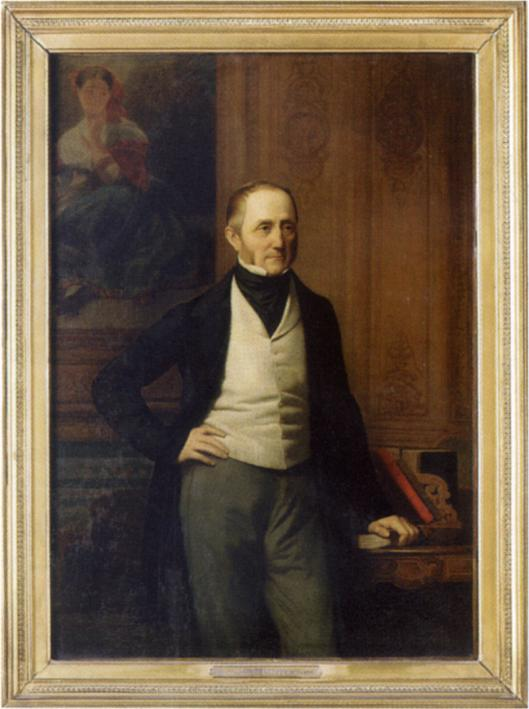
Baron Jean-Henri Hottinguer

Baron Jean-Henri Hottinguer (25 January 1803 – 1866) was the first-born son and heir of Baron Jean-Conrad Hottinguer. In 1818 he left Paris to learn the business world and to continue his education. His first destination was London, England, where he worked for Lloyd's and the English Stock Exchange. At the age of 23 he departed London for America, where he worked for several years. During this time he made contacts who would help him in future endeavours. He eventually returned to France to help his father with their banking business.

In 1816 Banque Hottinguer & Cie took an interest in the insurance business. They established the Compagnie Royale d’Assurance Maritime after the creation in 1789 of the first Compagnie Royal d’Assurance. Names that appear on the founding document of this institution: Jacques Laffitte, governor of the Bank of France, Hottinguer, Benjamin Delessert and twenty directors from the “Compagnie Royale d’Assurances Maritimes”. After this Benjamin Delessert and Banque Hottinguer & Cie found the Caisse d’Epargne the first savings bank for small investors.

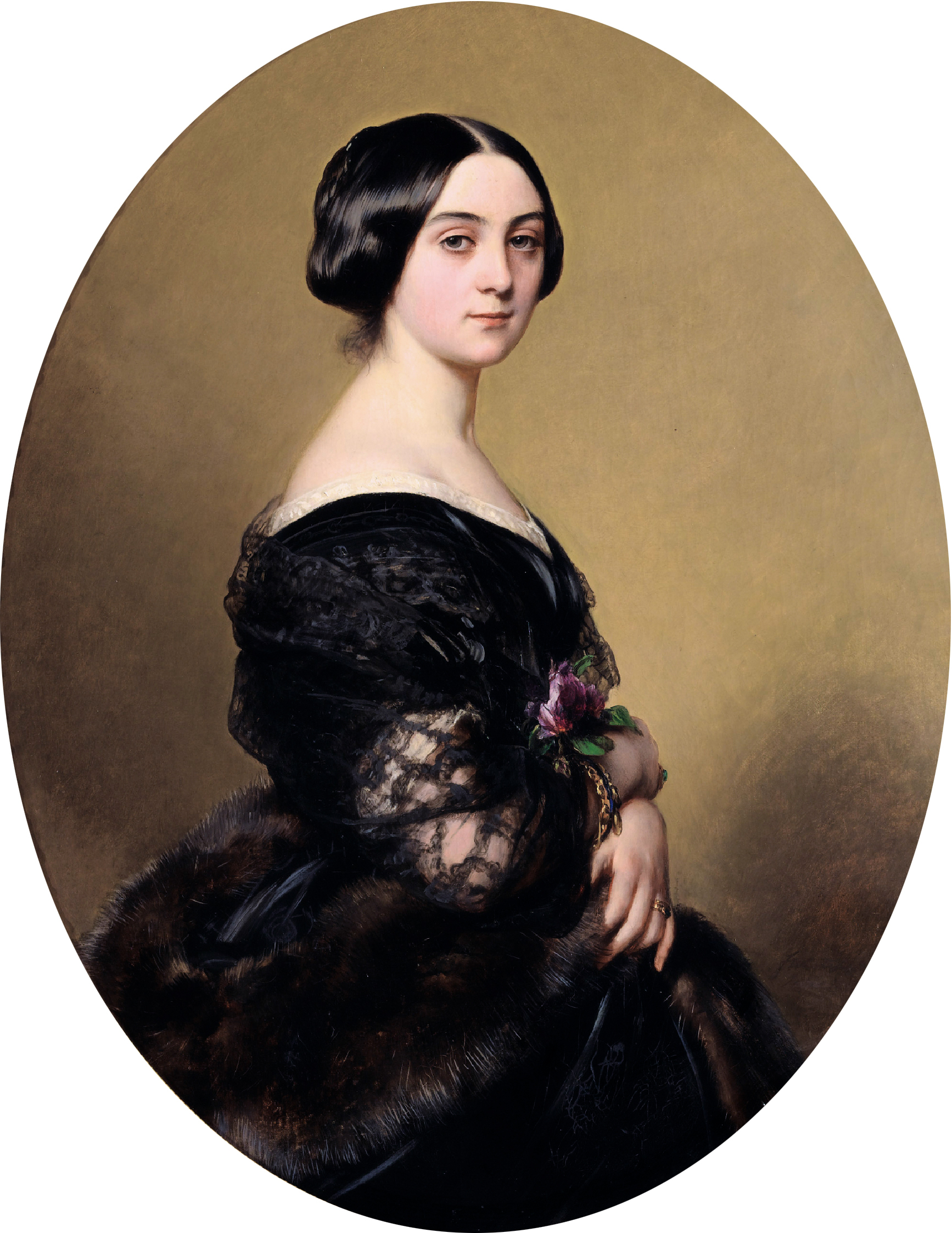
Caroline Delessert. (Franz Xaver Winterhalter,1851)

In 1833 Jean-Henri took control of Banque Hottinguer & Cie when his father retired. In 1858 Jean-Henri married Caroline Delessert, the only daughter of Baron Delessert.

One of his many achievements in life was in 1848, when he took control of the Delessert Bank after the death of Benjamin Delessert. His wife Caroline was the last of her Dynasty.

In 1852 Jean-Henri helped to set up the Compagnie Générale des Eaux, it was at one time part of Vivendi and is currently known as VEOLIA, and the first French rail network. In 1863 Jean-Henri participated along with other major banking families to create the Ottoman Bank in Istanbul, which then became the Australia and New Zealand bank.

Jean Henri died of natural causes at 63 in 1866. He was succeeded by his son Baron Rodolphe Hottinguer (1835-1920).

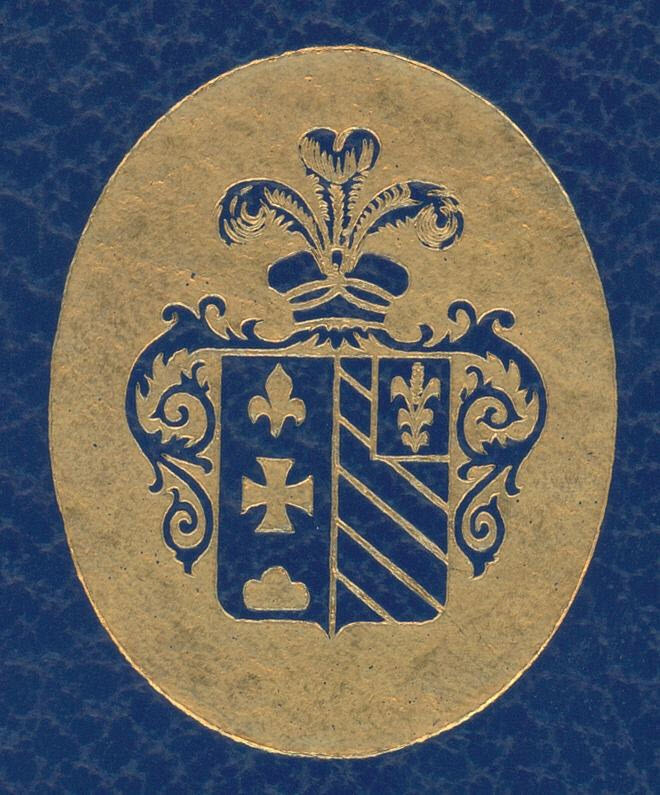
Baron Hottinguer Coat of Arm

== See also ==
- Hottinguer Family
- Hottinger Group

== Sources ==
- Messieurs Hottinguer Banquiers à Paris, Max Gérard, 1968, Tome Premier.

Preceded by Baron Jean-Conrad Hottinguer	Baron of Hottinguer; 1841–1866	Succeeded by Baron Rodolphe Hottinguer
