= Rodolphe Hottinguer (1835–1920) =

Third Baron Hottinguer

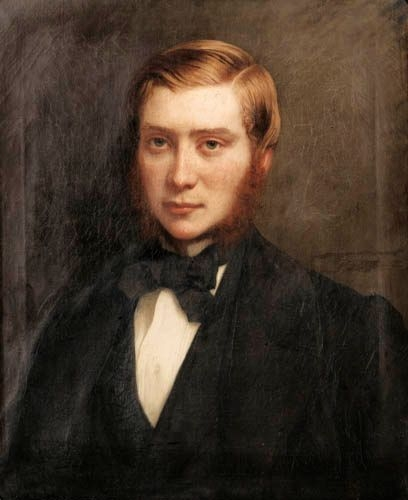
Baron Hottinguer

Baron Rodolphe Hottinguer was a banker who ran his family owned French bank Messieurs Hottinguer & Cie taking over from his father Baron Jean–Henri Hottinguer in 1866. He passed on the bank to his son Baron Henri Hottinguer at the age of 83. He was born in Paris in 1835 and died there in 1920.

== History ==
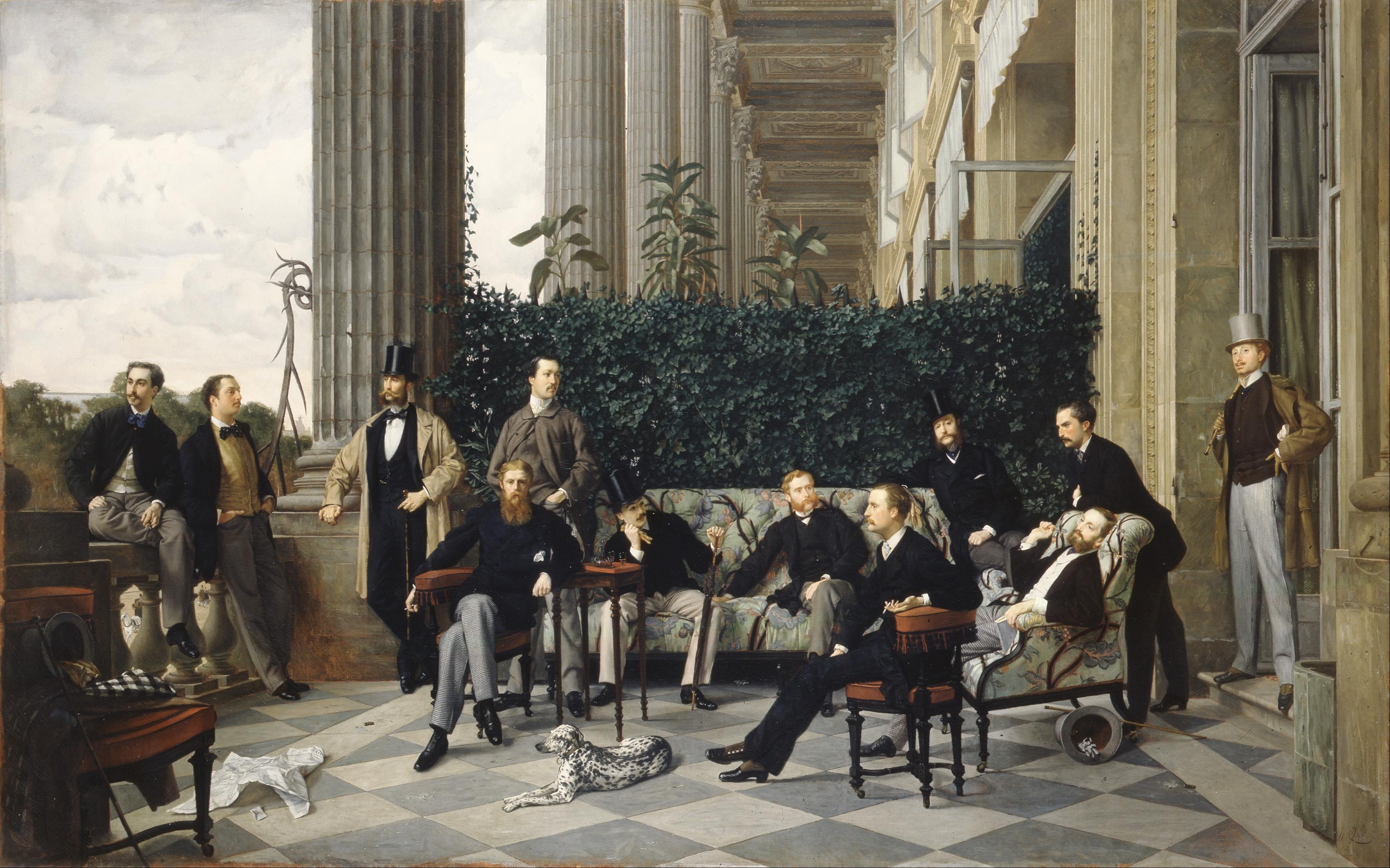
The balcony of the Cercle de la rue Royale in Paris by Tissot. Baron Rodolphe Hottinguer is in the picture, sitting on the sofa, without hat.

Like his father, Rodolphe at the age of 18 left Paris on a journey to England. He returned to Paris for a very short period before he took off on another voyage; the destination this time was America. When he returned, he achieved vast success in the financial world. His first stop was Constantinople, where he linked Hottinger & Cie with all the great banking families in Europe. During this time he founded the Ottoman Bank. For this he was personally thanked by the sultan and made grand vizier.

=== Career ===
During his time, the Hottinger banking house played an important role in major development projects in France and elsewhere in Europe: creation of major manufacturing and services companies, the co-founding of banking and insurance companies and the first railways—Baron Rodolphe was Vice Chairman of Chemins de fer de Paris à Lyon et à la Méditerranée, and his portrait, next to that of Sarah Bernhardt, still forms part of the fresco depicting numerous personalities of the time at the famous Train Bleu restaurant at the Gare de Lyon in Paris.

The Work of Baron Rodolphe during this time was to safeguard the Hottinguer Bank during the agitated times of the war of 1870 and the Great War. When he reached the age of 83 he entrusted the Bank to his son Henri Hottinguer.

== See also ==
- Hottinguer Family
- Hottinger Group

Baron Rodolphe Hottinguer in "Le Train Bleu" restaurant, (fresco by Albert Maignan)

== Sources ==
- Messieurs Hottinguer Banquiers à Paris, Max Gérard, 1968, Tome Premier.
- Capitals of Capital, A History of International Financial Centres, 1780–2005, ISBN 978-0-521-84535-9 / ISBN 0-521-84535-1

Preceded by Baron Jean-Henri Hottinguer	Baron of Hottinguer; 1866-1920	Succeeded by Baron Henri Hottinguer
