= Johann Heinrich Hottinger =

Swiss philologist and theologian (1620–1667)

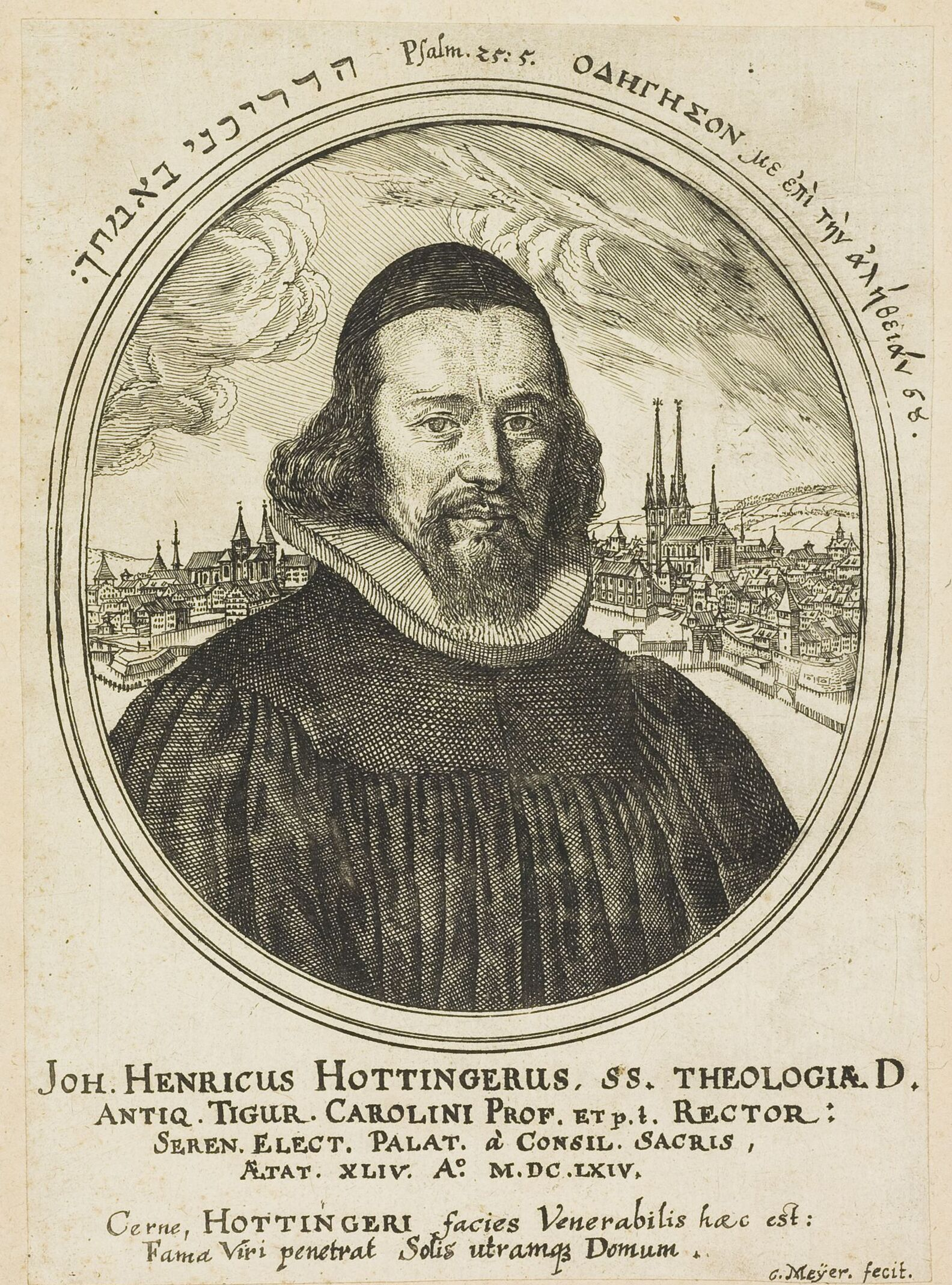
- Born: 10 March 1620; Zürich
- Died: 5 June 1667 (aged 46); Zürich
- Occupations: Theologian, philologist

Johann Heinrich Hottinger (10 March 1620 – 5 June 1667) was a Swiss philologist and theologian.

== Life and works ==
Hottinger studied at Geneva, Groningen and Leiden. After visiting France and England he was appointed professor of church history in his native town of Zürich in 1642. The chair of Hebrew at the Carolinum in Zürich was added in 1643, and in 1653 he was appointed professor ordinarius of logic, rhetoric and theology.

He gained such a reputation as an Oriental scholar that the Elector of the Palatinate in 1655 appointed him professor of Oriental languages and biblical criticism at the University of Heidelberg. While in Heidelberg he also worked to reestablish the Collegium Sapientiae, a Reformed theological seminary. In 1661 he returned to Zürich, where in 1662 he was appointed principal of the University of Zürich. In 1667 he accepted an invitation to succeed Johann Hoornbeck (1617–1666) as professor in the University of Leiden. Before he could take up this position he drowned with three of his children after the upsetting of a boat while crossing the river Limmat. He was succeeded upon his death at the chair of theology in Zürich by his fellow Zürich-native younger namesake and former student at Heidelberg, Johann Heinrich Heidegger.

His chief works are Historia ecclesiastica Nov. Test. (1651–1667); Thesaurus philologicus seu clavis scripturae (1649; 3rd edition 1698); Etymologicon orientale, sive lexicon harmonicum heptaglotton (1661). He also wrote a Hebrew and an Aramaic grammar.

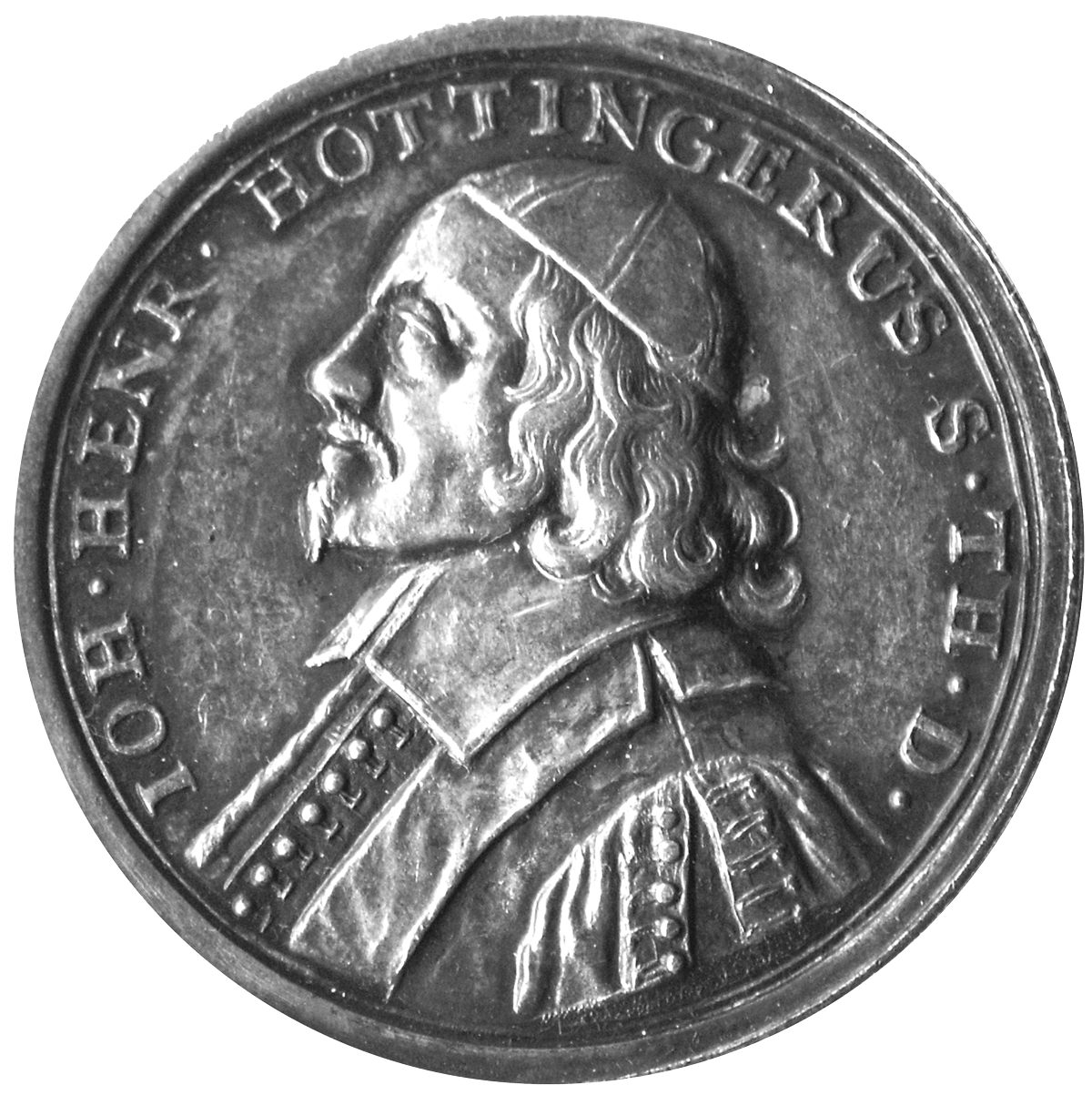
5 Ducat Austrian gold coin (1720) depicting Johann Heinrich Hottinger

== Family ==
His son, Johann Jakob Hottinger (1652–1735), who became professor of theology at Zürich in 1698, was the author of a work against Roman Catholicism, Helvetische Kirchengeschichte (4 vols, 1698–1729); and his grandson, Johann Heinrich Hottinger (1681–1750), who in 1721 was appointed professor of theology at Heidelberg, wrote a work on dogmatics, Typus doctrinae christianae (1714).

== Works ==
- Historia ecclesiastica Novi Testamenti 9 vols. (1651–1667)
- Historia orientalis (Zürich 1651)
- Cippi Hebraici (The Hebrews), (1662, 2nd edition)
- Thesaurus philologicus, Clavis scripturae (Philological Thesaurus, Key to Scripture), Zürich 1649, 3rd edition 1669
- Etymologicon orientale, sive Lexicon harmonicum heptaglotton (Heidelberg 1661)
