= Binette Schroeder =

German author and illustrator (1939–2022)

- Born: 5 December 1939; Hamburg, Germany
- Died: 5 July 2022 (aged 82); Gräfelfing, Bavaria, Germany
- Education: Schule für Gestaltung Basel
- Occupations: Author, illustrator

Binette Schroeder (5 December 1939 – 5 July 2022) was a German author and illustrator.

== Biography ==
Born in Hamburg, Schroeder studied typography in Munich and continued her studies in painting at the Schule für Gestaltung Basel. She wrote and illustrated numerous children's books, some of which received international awards, including two awards at the Biennial of Illustration Bratislava. She lived in Munich with her husband, children's book author and lawyer Peter Nickl. Schroeder died in Gräfelfing on 5 July 2022 at the age of 82.

== Works ==
- Help Us, Sister Karin! (1965), written by Maj Ulvskog, illustrated by Binnette Schroeder and Ingeborg Haun, published by Franz Schneider Verlag
- Susi and the Seal (1966), written by Jutta Grimm, illustrated by Binette Schroeder, published by Franz Schneider Verlag
- Bandit Captain Piepenbrink (1967), written by Walter Gronemann, illustrated by Binette Schroeder, published by Franz Schneider Verlag
- A Colorful Journey, or The Strange Adventures of Dorothea Pfeffer Marmelade (1968), written by Irene Rodrian, illustrated by Binette Schroeder, published by Franz Schneider Verlag
- Lupinchen (1969), written and illustrated by Binette Schroeder, published by NordSüd Verlag
- Flora's Magic House (1969), published by NorthSouth Books
- Archibald and his Little Red Cheek (1970), written and illustrated by Binette Schroeder, published by Verlag Heinrich Ellermann
- Florian und Traktor Max (1971), written and illustrated by Binette Schroeder, published by NordSüd Verlag
- Florian and Tractor Max (1971), published by G. P. Putnam's Sons
- Lelebum: A Rhyming and Pictorial Elephant Tale (1972), written and illustrated by Binette Schroeder, published by Thienemann-Esslinger Verlag
- Ratatatam: Die seltsame Geschichte einer kleinen Lok (1973), written by Peter Nickl, illustrated by Binette Schroeder, published by NordSüd Verlag
- Ratatatam (1973), translated by Michelle Nikly, published by L'École des loisirs
- Rommelebom: De avonturen van een kleine locomotief (1973), published by Uitgeverij Het Spectrum
- Ra ta ta tam, the Strange Story of a Little Engine (1973), translated by Michael Bullock
- Picture Book Number 1: First Annual Volume—Picture Stories & Comics for Children (1973), compiled by Hans-Joachim Gelberg, written and illustrated by Anne Bous, Dieter Brembs, Frank Bubenheim, Klaus Eberlein, Klaus Ensikat, Amrei Fechner, Günter Bruno Fuchs, Helga Gebert, Peter Gewessler, Sigrid Hanck, Astrid M. Hubbe, Janosch, Angelika Kaufmann, Georg Klusemann, Boy Lornsen, Lisa Loviscach, Hans Manz, Marie Marcks, Jo Pestum, Isolde Goldberg, Heidrun Petrides, Anneke Pinckernelle, Kristine Rothfuß, Christian Schälicke, Edith Schindler, Wilhelm Schlote, Cathrin and Volker Schlunk, Binette Schroeder, Stefan Stolze, F. K. Waechter, Elisabeth Wellendorf, and Wolfgang Zacharias, published by Beltz & Gelberg
- Krokodil Krokodil (1975), written by Peter Nickl, illustrated by Binette Schroeder, published by NordSüd Verlag
- Crocodile, Crocodile (1975), translated by Christopher Logue, published by Jonathan Cape
- Die wunderbaren Reisen und Abenteuer des Freiherrn von Münchhausenwie er dieselben bei einer Flasche im Zirkel seiner Freunde selbst zu erzählen pflegte (1977), based on the versions by Rudolf Erich Raspe and Gottfried August Bürger, written by Peter Nickl, illustrated by Binette Schroeder, published by NordSüd Verlag
- The Wonderful Travels and Adventures of Baron Münchhausen|The Wonderful Travels and Adventures of Baron Münchhausen, as Told by Himself in the Company of his Friends and Washed Down by Many a Good Bottle of Wine (1977), translated by Elizabeth Buchanan Taylor, published by Chatto & Windus
- Zebby Gone with the Wind (1981), written and illustrated by Binette Schroeder, published by Walker Books
- Shop, Zebby, Shop (1981), written and illustrated by Binette Schroeder, published by Walker Books
- Zebby's Breakfast (1981), written and illustrated by Binette Schroeder, published by Walker Books
- Run, Zebby, Run, Run, Run (1981), written and illustrated by Binette Schroeder, published by Walker Books
- Zebby Goes Swimming (1981), written and illustrated by Binette Schroeder, published by Walker Books
- The Shadow Sewing Machine (1982), written by Michael Ende, illustrated by Binette Schroeder, published by Thienemann-Esslinger Verlag
- The Dreaming House: A Walk Through the Night (1982), written by Peter Nickl, illustrated by Binette Schroeder, published by Edition Weitbrecht
- Tuffa and the Snow (1983), written and illustrated by Binette Schroeder, published by Dial Books for Young Readers
- Tuffa and the Bone (1983), written and illustrated by Binette Schroeder, published by Dial Books for Young Readers
- Tuffa and her Friends (1983), written and illustrated by Binette Schroeder, published by Dial Books for Young Readers
- Tuffa and the Picnic (1983), written and illustrated by Binette Schroeder, published by Dial Books for Young Readers
- Tuffa and the Ducks (1983), written and illustrated by Binette Schroeder, published by Dial Books for Young Readers
- The Cow Book (1983), compiled by Marc Gallant, illustrated by Marc Gallant, Wayne Anderson, Keleck, James Marsh, Braldt Bralds, Yōko Ochida, Michel Guiré-Vaka, B. G. Sharma, Lidia Postma, Bushiri Mruta Awazi, Jean-Christian Knaff, Luba Simansky, Binette Schroeder, Étienne Delessert, Martin Leman, Jocelyne Pache, Boris Vallejo, Claude Lapointe, Nicholas Price, Josef Paleček, Waldemar Świerzy, Ivan Generalić, Mark Hess, Alain Gauthier, Robert Giusti, and Robert Rodriguez, published by Alfred A. Knopf
- Beauty and the Beast (1986), written by Mme Leprince de Beaumont, retold by Anne Carter, illustrated by Binette Schroeder, published by Walker Books
- Der Froschkönig oder der eiserne Heinrich (1989), written by the Brothers Grimm (Wilhelm Grimm and Jacob Grimm), illustrated by Binette Schroeder, published by NordSüd Verlag
- The Frog Prince, or Iron Henry (1989), translated by Naomi Lewis, published by NorthSouth Books
- Nothing Stays the Way It Is: Stories of the Future (1991), compiled by Klaus Doderer, written and illustrated by Klaus Doderer, Nikolaus Heidelbach, James Krüss, Achim Bröger, Herbert Heckmann, Gudrun Pausewang, Gerhard Oberländer, Dagmar Chidolue, Frederik Hetmann, Harald Tondern, Jo Pestum, Barbara Schumann, Susanne Kilian, Michael Ende, Willi Fährmann, Klaus Ensikat, Klas E. Everwyn, Max von der Grün, Klaus Kordon, Irmela Brender, and Binette Schroeder, published by Roje & Buer
- The Legend of the Full Moon (1993), written by Michael Ende, illustrated by Binette Schroeder, published by Edition Weitbrecht
- Angels and Other Fowl 4: An Advent Calendar for Painting, Handicrafts and Snipping (1997), foreword by Ute Blaich, written and illustrated by Binette Schroeder, published by Rowohlt Verlag
- Softly Falls the Snow: A Songbook for the Christmas Season (1998), compiled by Herbert Mergarten, illustrated by Rotraut Susanne Berner, Quint Buchholz, Axel Scheffler, and Binette Schroeder, published by Carl Hanser Verlag
- Laura (1999), written and illustrated by Binette Schroeder, published by NordSüd Verlag
- Silent Night Advent Calendar (2005), song "Silent Night" written by Joseph Mohr and Franz Xaver Gruber, illustrated by Binette Schroeder, published by NorthSouth Books
- Listen—No Animal Is So Small That It Could Not Be a Brother to You: Poems and Pictures (2006), compiled by Armin Abmeier, written by Michael Krüger, H. C. Artmann, Apollinaire, Charles Baudelaire, Elisabeth Borchers, Wolfgang Borchert, Bertolt Brecht, Wilhelm Busch, E. E. Cummings, Günter Eich, Erich Fried, Robert Gernhardt, Johann Wolfgang von Goethe, Franz Grillparzer, Josef Guggenmos, Ernst Jandl, Sarah Kirsch, Max Kruse, Gotthold Ephraim Lessing, Eduard Mörike, Christian Morgenstern, Jacques Prévert, Rainer Maria Rilke, Joachim Ringelnatz, Theodor Storm, and Francois Villon, illustrated by Monika Aichele, ATAK, Verena Ballhaus, Jutta Bauer, Rotraut Susanne Berner, Larissa Bertonasco, Käthi Bhend, Aljoscha Blau, Heidrun Boddin, Quint Buchholz, Klaus Ensikat, Wolf Erlbruch, Anke Feuchtenberger, Susanne Göhlich, Moritz Götze, Isabel Große Holtforth, Stefanie Harjes, Nikolaus Heidelbach, Sybille Hein, Egbert Herfurth, Marie Marcks, Barbara Jung, Ole Könnecke, Nora Krug, Yvonne Kuschel, Günter Mattei, Kat Menschik, Reinhard Michl, Thomas M. Müller, Volker Pfüller, Henriette Sauvant, Axel Scheffler, Stefanie Schilling, Peter Schössow, Binette Schroeder, Marei Schweitzer, Michael Sowa, Helga Spieß, Katrin Stangl, Hans Traxler, Sabine Wilharm, Linda Wolfsgruber, and Franz Zauleck, published by Carlsen Verlag
- Aurore (2008), translated by Michelle Nikly, published by Editions NordSüd
- Ritter Rüstig & Ritter Rostig (2009), written and illustrated by Binette Schroeder, published by NordSüd Verlag
- La toute petite bataille des chevaliers Sans-Peur & Sans-Soucis (2009), translated by Anne-Judith Descombey, published by NordSüd Verlag|Editions NordSüd
- Sir Lofty & Sir Tubb (2009), published by NorthSouth Books
- Der Zauberling (2014), written and illustrated by Binette Schroeder, published by NordSüd Verlag
- The Wizardling (2014), published by Little Island Books
- Bilderbuch-Brunnen (2019), written and illustrated by Binette Schroeder, published by NordSüd Verlag
- Binette Schroeder’s Well of Stories (2020), published by NorthSouth Books
- Herr Grau & Frieda Fröhlich (2021), written and illustrated by Binette Schroeder, published by NordSüd Verlag
- Mr. Gray & Frieda Frolic (2021), published by NorthSouth Books

== Distinctions ==
- Golden Apple of Bratislava (1971)
- Golden Plate of Bratislava (1973)
- Prix Octogones (2000)
- Deutscher Jugendliteraturpreis (2004)
- Bavarian Order of Merit (2012)
