= Elena Odriozola =

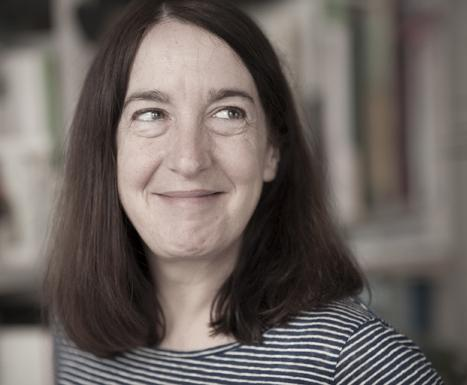
- Born: Elena Odriozola; 1967 (age 58–59); San Sebastián, Spain
- Occupation: illustrator
- Writing career
- Language: Basque
- Genre: children literature

Elena Odriozola (born 1967) is a Spanish illustrator of books for children and young adults. For her lasting contribution to children's literature she received the Golden Apple of the Biennial of Illustration Bratislava (2015) for her work illustrating in 2013 Frankenstein or The Modern Prometheus.

== Biography ==
Elena Odriozola was born in San Sebastián, Guipúzcoa, Spain. Painting is her passion. Elena Odriozola inherited his grandfather's and father's love for painting .

She studied Art and Decoration, and worked in an advertising agency first.

In 1995 she published the first children book with the basque author Jesus Mari Olaizola "Txiliku". Agure jakagorria by Elkar basque editor.

In 1997 she started to work as an illustrator, mainly of books, and she is now a successful illustrator of children's and young people's books.

Her creations are translated into several languages and she is often selected to take part in prestigious illustration exhibitions.

== Awards and public recognition ==
- National Illustration Award of Spain (2015)
- Mikel Zarate Children's Literature Award (2015)
- Junceda Illustration Award (2014)
- Basque Literary Illustration Award (2013 and 2009)
- 'The IBBY Honour List is a biennial selection with the title Atxiki sekretua. (2006)
- Selected by Martin Salisbury from the edition of Play Pen : New Children's Book Illustration (Lawrence King, 2007)
- Something about the author. Volume 186 by Lisa Kumar;(Gale, 2008)

== Works ==
=== Works illustrated ===
Some works translated into English

- Frankenstein or The Modern Prometheus = Spanish edition: Frankenstein, Nórdica, 2013)
- What I do with vegetable glue by Susan Chandler (Sky Pony Press, 2012)
- A woodland secret by Javier Sobrino (OQO; Perth : Roundabout [distributor], 2009)
- The story blanket by Ferida Wolff; Harriet May Savitz (Sky Pony Press, 2012)
- The story of Noah by Stephanie Rosenheim (Peachtree, 2008.)
- The Opposite by Tom MacRae (Peachtree, 2006)
- Supersonic tonic by Stephanie Rosenheim (Hamilton, 1982)

=== Original works ===
- Agure jakagorria. Jesus Mari Olaizola "Txiliku" / Elena Odriozola (Elkar, 1995).
- Ahatetxoa eta sahats negartia. Mariasun Landa / Elena Odriozola (Elkar, 1997).
- Zergatik ez du kantatzen txantxagorriak?. Xabier Mendiguren Elizegi / Elena Odriozola (Elkar, 1997).
- Amona, zure Iholdi. Mariasun Landa / Elena Odriozola (Kometa, 1998).
- Txoko txiki txukuna. Joxantonio Ormazabal /Elena Odriozola (Elkarlanean, 1998).
- Botoi bat bezala. Juan Kruz Igerabide / Elena Odriozola (Anaya, 1999).
- Ortzadarraren kantua. Jon Suarez Barrutia/ Elena Odriozola (Aizkorri, 1999).
- Zak zikoina. Joxemari Iturralde / Elena Odriozola (Elkar, 2000).
- Dindirri = Flick. Anjel Lertxundi / Elena Odriozola (Gara, 2000).
- Gorritxo eta Beltxiko. Joxantonio Ormazabal /Elena Odriozola (Elkar, 2000).
- Axa mixa zilarra. Jesus Mari Olaizola "Txiliku" / Elena Odriozola (Elkar, 2000).
- Kofi itsasora bidean. Javi Cillero Goiriastuena / Elena Odriozola (Elkar, 2001).
- Izar euria. Felipe Juaristi / Elena Odriozola (Elkar, 2001).
- Bihotza zubi. Joxantonio Ormazabal /Elena Odriozola (Elkar, 2001).
- Hosto gorri, hosto berde. Juan Kruz Igerabide / Elena Odriozola (Atenea, 2002).
- Roke izeneko comuna. Antton Dueso / Elena Odriozola (Aizkorri, 2002).
- Maiderren taupada bilduma. Maite Gonzalez / Elena Odriozola (Alberdania, 2002).
- Marlene eta taxizapata. Mariasun Landa / Elena Odriozola (SM, 2002).
- Astoari konfiturak. Juan Luis Mugertza Unanue / Elena Odriozola (Aizkorri, 2002).
- Hiztegi jolastia. Joxantonio Ormazabal /Elena Odriozola (Elkar, 2002).
- Eta txorimaloa mintzatu zen. Ruben Ruiz / Elena Odriozola (Elkar, 2002).
- Paularen zazpi gauak. Patxi Zubizarreta / Elena Odriozola (Giltza, 2002).
- Usoa: Lehen kanpamendua. Patxi Zubizarreta / Elena Odriozola (Erein, 2002).
- Usoa; Zelatan. Patxi Zubizarreta / Elena Odriozola (Erein, 2002).
- Margarita. Ruben Dario / Elena Odriozola (Imaginarium, 2003).
- Bosniara nahi. Juan Kruz Igerabide / Elena Odriozola (Aizkorri, 2003).
- Amona basoan galdu zenekoa. Arantxa Iturbe / Elena Odriozola (Elkar, 2003).
- Haydn-en loroa. Felipe Juaristi / Elena Odriozola (Aizkorri, 2003).
- Euria. Daniel Nesquens / Elena Odriozola (Aizkorri, 2003).
- Eta txorimaloa mintzatu zen. Ruben Ruiz / Elena Odriozola (Aizkorri, 2003).
- Dindirri. Anjel Lertxundi / Elena Odriozola (SM, 2003).
- Osaba Bin Floren. Jesus Mari Olaizola "Txiliku" / Elena Odriozola (Elkar, 2003).
- Norak suhiltzaile izan nahi du. Arantxa Iturbe / Elena Odriozola (Elkarlanean, 2003).
- Zaldiko-maldikoan. Ana Urkiza / Elena Odriozola (Aizkorri, 2003).
- Usoa: bidaia kilikagarria. Patxi Zubizarreta / Elena Odriozola Erein, 2003.
- Usoa: karpeta morea. Patxi Zubizarreta / Elena Odriozola (Erein, 2003).
- Atxiki sekretua: sorginaren eskuliburua. Patxi Zubizarreta / Elena Odriozola (Elkar, 2004).
- Hiru lagun. Patxi Zubizarreta / Elena Odriozola (Ibaizabal, 2005).
- Gorputz osorako poemak. Juan Kruz Igerabide / Elena Odriozola (Aizkorri, 2005).
- Maitagarrien hiru ipuin. Gustavo Martín Garzo / Elena Odriozola (Elkar, 2005).
- Begira begira: tradizioaren leihotik. Batzuen artean / Elena Odriozola (Elkar, 2006).
- Zaharrak berri, euriak. Elena Larreategi / Elena Odriozola (Gero, 2006).
- Ilunorduak eta argilaurdenak. Joxantonio Ormazabal /Elena Odriozola (Elkar, 2007).
- Marrazkitan blai. Daniel Nesquens / Elena Odriozola (Aizkorri, 2007).
- Furia. Patxi Zubizarreta / Elena Odriozola (Erein, 2007).
- Sekretuak belarrira. Ruben Ruiz / Elena Odriozola (Aizkorri, 2007).
- Kafka eta panpina bidaiaria. Jordi Serra i Fabra / Elena Odriozola (Elkar, 2008).
- Nire eskola. Jordi Serra i Fabra / Elena Odriozola (Erein, 2008).
- Ipuinen haria. Ferida Wolff eta Harreit May Savitz / Elena Odriozola (Ttarttalo, 2008).
- Amilami: laminen istoriak. Juan Kruz Igerabide / Elena Odriozola Elkar, 2008.
- Basoak badu sekretu bat. Javier Sobrino / Elena Odriozola (Txalaparta, 2009).
- Aharrausi printzesa. Carmen Gil / Elena Odriozola (Txalaparta, 2009).
- Printzesa begi-zulo. Juan Kruz Igerabide / Elena Odriozola (Elkar, 2009).
- Sasi guztien gainetik. Itziar Zubizarreta / Elena Odriozola (Galtzagorri Elkartea, 2010).
- Haizelami. Joxantonio Ormazabal /Elena Odriozola (Elkar, 2010).
- Eguberria: 24 ohitura, kantu eta istorio. Juan Kruz Igerabide / Elena Odriozola (Nerea, 2012).
- Haizea sahats artean. Keneth Grahame / Elena Odriozola (Erein, 2013).
- Ur: erori ez nahi duen tanta. Juan Kruz Igerabide / Elena Odriozola (Denonartean, 2014).
- Mundua baloi batean. Patxi Zubizarreta / Elena Odriozola (Elkar, 2014).
- Galtxagorri langileak. Mitxel Murua / Elena Odriozola (Ikaselkar, 2014).
- Ahatetxo itsusia. Arantza Zugazagasti / Elena Odriozola (Ikaselkar, 2014).
- Gulliver Liliputen. Arantza Zugazagasti / Elena Odriozola Ikaselkar, 2014.
- Izei txikia. Joxantonio Ormazabal /Elena Odriozola (Ikaselkar, 2014).
- Elsa eta paradisua. Mariasun Landa / Elena Odriozola Giltza, 2015.
- Azken balada. Mariasun Landa / Elena Odriozola (Erein, 2016)

=== Design works ===
- Galtzagorri Association trade mark design, 2003
- Bularretik Mintzora Literature Program trade mark design from Galtzagorri Association, 2007
- Five cups design from Cuanta tierra necesita un hombre book promotion, Nórdica editor, 2014
- Exhibition promotion: Emakumeak eta itsasoa. = Women and the sea, Untzi Museoa, San Sebastián, 2016
- Musical Fortnight promotion Donostiako Musika Hamabostaldia, Kursaal, San Sebastián, 2016

=== Exhibitions ===
- Tropecista/ Lugaritz Kultur Etxea (Donostia . Basque Country, 2014)
- Tropecista Exhibition / GKo Gallery (Tolosa . Basque Country, 2014)
- Eguberria / Centro Cultural Montehermoso (Vitoria-Gasteiz . Basque Country, 2013)
- Había otra vez at Centro Cultural de España en México (Mexico, 2013).
- Aiete Cultural Centre of Donostia/San Sebastián (Basque Country, 2013).
- Patria comun. Delibes Ilustrado (Miguel Delibes Foundation, 2012-2013).
- Casa de Cultura Okendo. Collective (San Sebastián . Basque Country, 2011).
- Le Immagini della Fantasia. Sàrmede Municipal Palace (Italy, 2010 and 2012).
- Bologna Children's Book Fair Illustrators Exhibition. (Italy, 2010).
- European Children's Book Fair in Saarbrücken (Germany, 2010).
- Txoritxoak. Koldo Mitxelena Cultural Centre (San Sebastián . Basque Country, 2009).
- Tour d’Europe en 27 livres d’images. National Library of France (Paris, 2008).
- Espacio Sins Entido (Madrid, 2007).
- Mínimo. Ernest Lluch Cultural Centre (San Sebastián . Basque Country, 2006).
- Ilustrísimos. Bologna Children's Book Fair (Italy, 2005).
