= Lidia Postma =

Dutch writer, cartoonist and illustrator

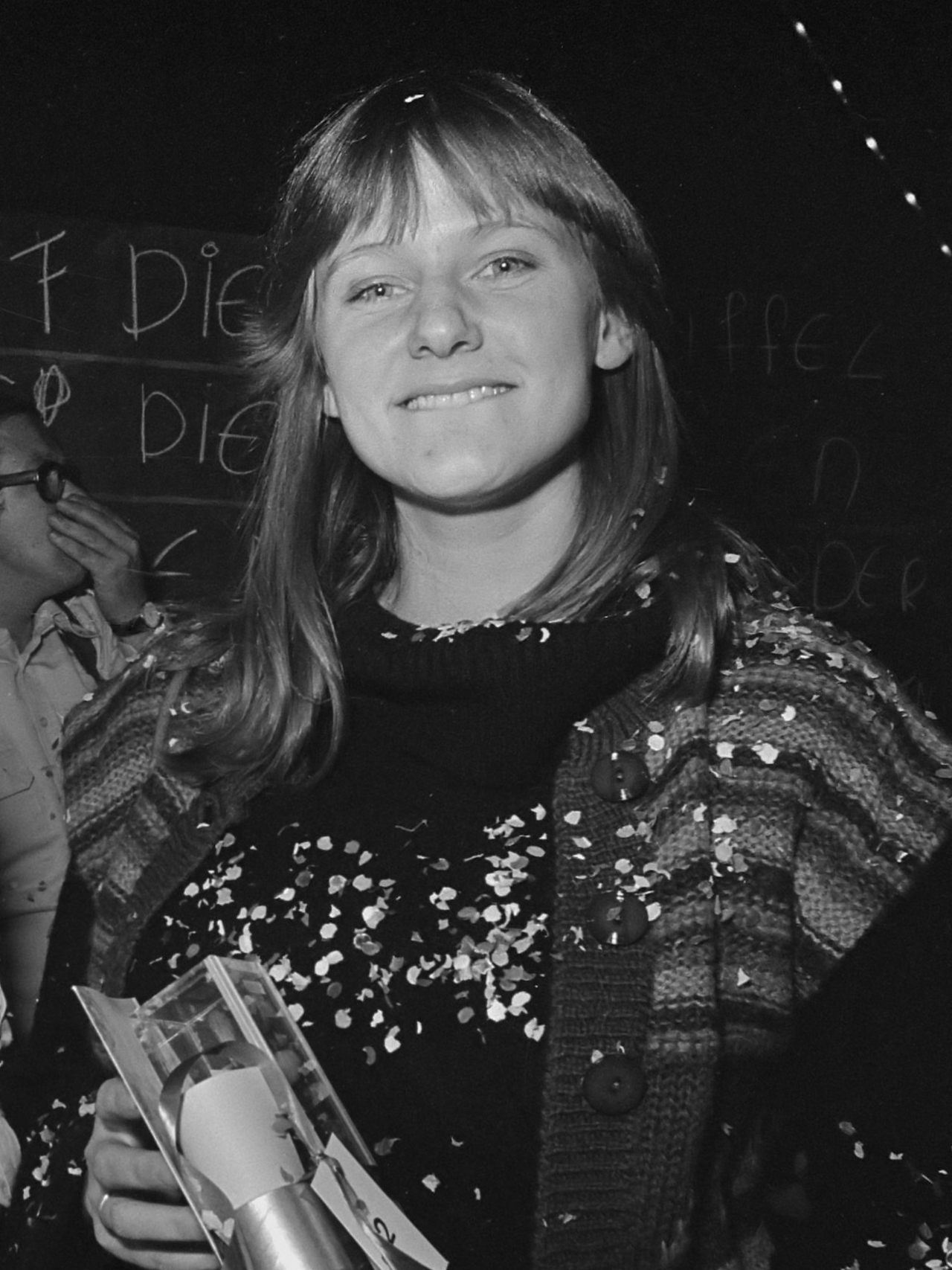
- Postma with the Gouden Penseel in 1976
- Born: April 2, 1952 (age 74); Hoorn, Netherlands
- Awards: Gouden Penseel, Gouden Appel

Lidia Postma (born April 2, 1952) is a Dutch writer, artist and illustrator. She is best known for her children's picture books and her Tolkien illustrations.

== Life ==
Postma was born in Hoorn. She trained as an illustrator at the Free Graphics and Painting Department of the Rietveld Academy in Amsterdam. In 1976 she received a Gouden Penseel (Golden Brush) for her illustrations of Hans Christian Andersen's Sprookjes en vertellingen (1975); this was a prize awarded to talented new illustrators. Two years later she was honored with the Gouden Appel (Golden Apple), awarded at the Biennial of Illustration Bratislava by a jury with members from thirteen countries.

== Bibliography ==
- The Stolen Mirror (1976)
- The Witch's Garden (1978)

=== As illustrator ===
- Sprookjes en vertellingen by Hans Christian Andersen (1975)
- The Cow Book, compiled by Marc Gallant, illustrated by Marc Gallant, Wayne Anderson, Keleck, James Marsh, Braldt Bralds, Yōko Ochida, Michel Guiré-Vaka, B. G. Sharma, Lidia Postma, Bushiri Mruta Awazi, Jean Christian Knaff, Luba Simansky, Binette Schroeder, Étienne Delessert, Martin Leman, Jocelyne Pache, Boris Vallejo, Claude Lapointe, Nicholas Price, Josef Paleček, Waldemar Świerzy, Ivan Generalić, Mark Hess, Alain Gauthier, Robert Giusti, and Robert Rodriguez, published by Alfred A. Knopf (1983)
- The Twelve Dancing Princesses and Other Tales from Grimm by Naomi Lewis (translator/editor) (1986)
- Night Story by Paul Biegel (1992)
- The Hobbit Companion by David Day (1997)
