= B. G. Sharma =

Bhanwar lal Girdhari lal Sharma (5 August 1924 – November 2007), better known as B. G. Sharma, was a painter from Rajasthan, India. He is famous for his miniature devotional paintings and his rejuvenation and popularization of classic Rajasthan art, including the Mughal, Kishangarh, and Kangra styles. He is also well known for experimenting and mixing modern with traditional styles and producing some exemplary pieces of art.

Sharma was born 5 August 1924 in Nathdwara, a small town near Udaipur. Nathdwara is home to the Shrinathji Krishna temple complex, which supports an artists community. Sharma's family had been artists for generations.

Sharma has been exhibited internationally in London, Germany, and the United States. The Shri B.G.Sharma Art Gallery in Udaipur contains an extensive collection of his works.

His father, Shri Girdhari Lal ji and grandfather, Shri Liladhar ji (also from Nathdwara), had an early influence on B. G. Sharma. B. G. Sharma, however, later broke away to evolve his own style.

Former Indian Prime Minister Indira Gandhi, British monarch Queen Elizabeth II and former Australian Prime Minister Malcolm Fraser all commissioned portraits by Sharma. His various awards include India's National Art Award for Master Craftsman.

A collection of Sharma's artwork was published in September 2000 titled Form of Beauty: The Krishna Art of B.G.Sharma.

He died in November 2007 at the age of 83.

== Bibliography ==
- The Cow Book (1983), compiled by Marc Gallant, illustrated by Marc Gallant, Wayne Anderson, Keleck, James Marsh, Braldt Bralds, Yōko Ochida, Michel Guiré-Vaka, B. G. Sharma, Lidia Postma, Bushiri Mruta Awazi, Jean-Christian Knaff, Luba Simansky, Binette Schroeder, Étienne Delessert, Martin Leman, Jocelyne Pache, Boris Vallejo, Claude Lapointe, Nicholas Price, Josef Paleček, Waldemar Świerzy, Ivan Generalić, Mark Hess, Alain Gauthier, Robert Giusti, and Robert Rodriguez, published by Alfred A. Knopf
