= Tere =

Tere may refer to:

- Tere Garcia de Madero (born 1946), Mexican politician
- Tere Gilbert, New Zealand early childhood educator and Māori language advocate
- Tere Glassie (born 1977), Australian rugby league football player
- Tere Marichal (born 1956), Puerto Rican actress and writer
- Tere O'Connor (born 1958), American dancer, choreographer and educator
- Tere Pica (1945–2011), American professor
- Tere Ríos (1917–1999), American writer
- Abigail Tere-Apisah (born 1992), Papua New Guinea tennis player
- Tere Tereba, American fashion designer, writer, and actress
- Tere Velázquez (1942–1998), Mexican actress
- Tere A. Zubizarreta (1937 – 2007), Hispanic community activist
