= Zubizarreta =

Zubizarreta is a Basque surname. Notable people with the surname include:

- Ibán Espadas Zubizarreta, Spanish footballer
- Ángel Garma Zubizarreta, Spanish-Argentine psychoanalyst
- Carmen Garayalde Zubizarreta, Uruguayan artist
- Àlex Monner Zubizarreta, Spanish actor
- Ainhoa Murúa Zubizarreta, Spanish triathlete
- Andoni Zubizarreta (born 1961), Spanish football goalkeeper
- Carlos Zubizarreta (1904–1972), Paraguayan writer
- Félix Zubizarreta, Spanish footballer
- Iker Zubizarreta, Venezuelan footballer, grandson of Félix
- Izaskun Zubizarreta Guerendiain (born 1970), Spanish ski mountaineer
- Patxi Zubizarreta (born 1964), Spanish writer
- Tere A. Zubizarreta, Cuban-American advertiser
- Valentín Zubizarreta y Unamunsaga (1862–1948), Cuban Roman Catholic bishop
