= Naomi Lewis =

British author and critic

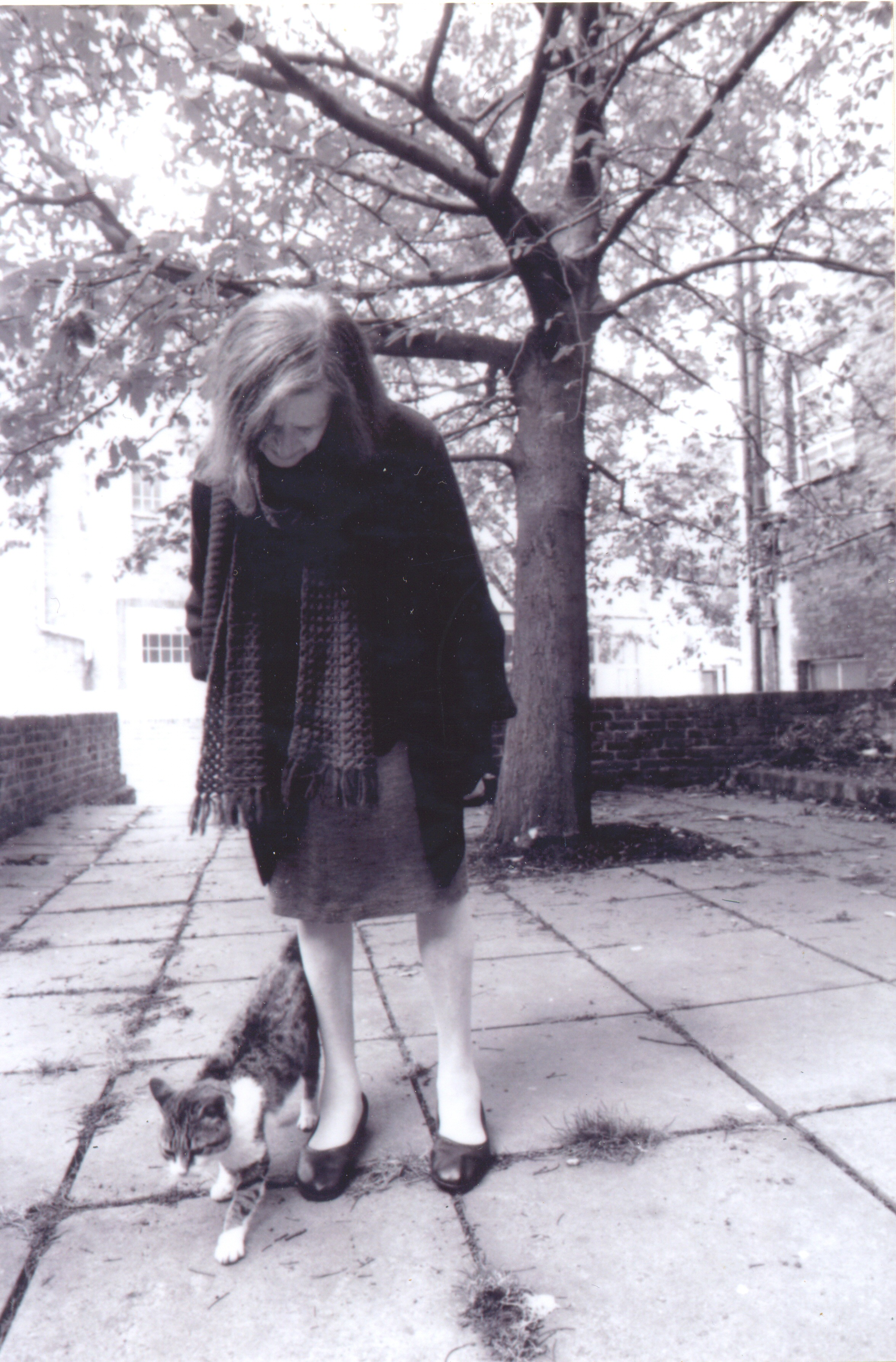
- Born: 3 September, 1911; Great Yarmouth, Norfolk, England
- Died: 5 July 2009 (aged 97); London, England
- Occupations: Poet, writer

Naomi Lewis (3 September 1911 – 5 July 2009) was a British poet, essayist, literary critic, anthologist and reteller of stories for children. She is particularly noted for her translations of the Danish children's author, Hans Christian Andersen, as well as for her critical reviews and essays. She was a recipient of the Eleanor Farjeon Award. Lewis was an advocate of animal rights and was known to rescue injured pigeons and stray cats.

== Early life ==
Born in Great Yarmouth to a Latvian Jewish father who was a fish merchant, she was the second of four siblings. Her mother was a talented artist and musician. Due to the antisemitism of the 1930s, the family took the mother's surname, Lewis. They moved to London's Red Lion Square in 1935, into the block of flats in which Naomi was to reside until her death. Lewis went to Great Yarmouth High School and won a scholarship to study English at Westfield College, University of London.

== Career ==
Following a number of jobs working as a teacher and a copywriter, she started her career as a writer after the Second World War by entering the weekly competitions run by the New Statesman. Quickly noticed by her contemporaries as an intelligent and insightful critic, she went on to produce regular articles for the New Statesman, as well as for The Observer, The Times Literary Supplement, the New York Times and the Listener. Her first published work, A Visit to Mrs. Wilcox (1957) included a selection of these articles and won immediate acclaim, becoming a Book Society recommendation.

In an article published in Essays in Criticism (1951), Albert Gerard cites a sentence from her, indicating an invaluable comparison she made between Coleridge and Keats, a comparison that had not been made earlier than her time in essence the way she originally suggested: “modern judgement, it seems, can accept either Coleridge or Keats – not both.” Indeed, she was one of the first critics to elaborate on a specific aspect of modern thinking in that Coleridge was a man of ideas dealing with the abstract, the spiritual and the ideal, whereas Keats was a man of concrete experience and tangible sense of observation. She was thus one of the proponents of twentieth-century thought which states that spirituality and tangible senses had better be separated conceptually.

Over the sixty years of her literary career, Lewis produced a vast number of works; as a reviewer, an anthologist and as a poet in her own right. Notable amongst these was A Footprint on the Air (1983) an anthology of nature verse named after her own poem, and Messages (1985), a celebrated collection of poetry which included three of her own original poems: The Wolf said to Francis (under the pseudonym A. G. Rochelle), Counsel, and Creatures of Early Morning. In 2000, Messages was chosen by the UK's first Children's Laureate, Quentin Blake, as one of his fifty favorite books (The Laureate's Party, Random House). Naomi herself was particularly fond of the 1993 publication The Mardi Gras Cat, in which she presented a carefully selected gallery of feline personalities, each immortalized in poetry.

Lewis taught poetry appreciation and creative writing at London's City Literary Institute for many years, and due to popular demand went on doing so well past the official age of retirement. Some of the poems produced in that class were included in Messages, alongside lifelong favorites Robert Browning, Stevie Smith and Emily Dickinson. She also lectured periodically at the South Place Ethical Society, where she was a long-time member. Among the various subjects were talks on her favourite children's authors Hans Christian Andersen and Andrew Lang and the Italian author and Holocaust survivor Primo Levi, whose work she championed from its first publication in the UK.

=== Personal life ===
Lewis was a vegetarian and advocate of animal rights. She opposed all forms of animal mistreatment. She complained in a letter to the Evening Standard, "What moral right have humans to lay on sensitive creatures the sufferings of their own vanity, greed and cowardice, and a host of various sins?" Due to her habit of rescuing stray cats and injured pigeons around her home her Bloomsbury neighbourhood, she was featured on the BBC programme London Identities and made the subject of a national newspaper article. She used to take the injured pigeons to the restrooms at Conway Hall to give them a safe space to practice flying.

=== Awards ===
Lewis was honored with the Eleanor Farjeon Award for services to children's literature in 1975 and by her election as Fellow of the Royal Society of Literature in 1981.

== Bibliography ==
=== As an author ===
- A Visit to Mrs. Wilcox (for adults; essays), Cresset Press (London), 1957.
- The Butterfly Collector (Author of verse text), illustrated by Fulvio Testa, Andersen Press (London), 1978, Prentice-Hall (New York), 1979.
- Leaves (Author of verse text), illustrated by Fulvio Testa, Andersen Press (London), 1980, Peter Bedrick (New York), 1983.
- Once upon a Rainbow, illustrated by Gabriele Eichenauer, Jonathan Cape (London), 1981.
- Come with Us (poems), illustrations by Leo Lionni, Andersen Press (London), 1982.
- Marco Polo and Wellington: Search for Solomon (With Janice Thompson), Jonathan Cape (London), 1982.
- Puffin (With Deborah King), Jonathan Cape (London), Lothrop, Lee & Shepard (New York), 1984.
- Swan (With Deborah King), Jonathan Cape (London), Lothrop, Lee & Shepard (New York), 1985.
- A School Bewitched (based on Edith Nesbit's Fortunatus Rex, or The Mystery of the Disappearing Schoolgirls), illustrated by Errol Le Cain, Blackie (London), 1985.
- The Stepsister, illustrated by Allison Reed, Hutchinson (London), Dial Books (New York City), 1987.
- Johnny Longnose (With James Kruess) (picture book with poetry by Lewis), illustrated by Stasys Eidrigevicius, North-South Books (New York), 1989.
- The Mardi Gras Cat (poetry), Heinemann (London), 1993.

=== Works retold ===
- The Three Golden Hairs: A Story from the Brothers Grimm, illustrated by Francoise Tresy, Hutchinson (London, England), 1983.
- Jutta Ash, Jorinda and Joringel (based on Jorinde und Joringel by the Brothers Grimm), Andersen (London, England), 1984.
- Stories from the Arabian Nights (and author of introduction), illustrated by Anton Pieck, Methuen (London, England), Holt (New York, NY), 1987.
- Cry Wolf and Other Aesop Fables, illustrated by Barry Castle, Methuen (London, England), Oxford University Press (New York, NY), 1988.

=== Works translated ===
- South from the Red Sea by Haroun Tazieff, Lutterworth Press (London, England), 1956.
- Hans Christian Andersen's Fairy Tales (and author of notes and introduction) by Hans Christian Andersen, illustrated by Philip Gough, Puffin (London, England), 1981.
- The Wild Swans, by Hans Christian Andersen, illustrated by Angela Barrett, E. Benn (London, England), Peter Bedrick (New York, NY), 1984.
- The Flying Trunk and Other Stories from Hans Andersen, Andersen (London, England), Prentice-Hall (New York, NY), 1986.
- My Magic Cloth: A Story for a Whole Week by Heide Helene Beisert, illustrated by Beisert, North-South Books (London, England, and New York, NY), 1986.
- Wedding Birds by Jutta Ash, (adapted from a traditional German song), Andersen (London, England), 1986.
- The Swineherd, by Hans Christian Andersen, illustrated by Dorothee Duntze, North-South Books (New York, NY), 1987.
- The Snow Queen (and author of introduction), by Hans Christian Andersen, illustrated by Angela Barrett, Holt (New York, NY), 1988.
- Proud Knight, Fair Lady: The Twelve Lais of Marie de France (and author of introduction), illustrated by Angela Barrett, Viking (New York, NY), 1989.
- The Frog Prince, or Iron Henry (original title: "Der Froschkönig oder der eiserne Heinrich"), by Jacob and Wilhelm Grimm, illustrated by Binette Schroeder, North-South Books (New York, NY), 1989.
- The Tale of the Vanishing Rainbow by Siegfried P. Rupprecht, illustrated by Jozef Wilkon, North-South Books (New York, NY), 1989.
- The Nightingale (and author of introduction) by Hans Christian Andersen, illustrated by Josef Paleček, North-South Books (New York, NY), 1990.
- Three Kings by Kurt Baumann, illustrated by Ivan Gantschev, North-South Books (New York, NY), 1990.
- Thumbelina, by Hans Christian Andersen, North-South Books (New York, NY), 1990.
- The Steadfast Tin Soldier, by Hans Christian Andersen, illustrated by P. J. Lynch, Andersen (London, England), 1991, Harcourt (San Diego, CA), 1992.
- The Hungry One: A Poem by Kurt Baumann, illustrated by Stasys Eidrigevicius, North-South Books (New York, NY), 1993.
- Puss in Boots by Charles Perrault, illustrated by Stasys Eidrigevicius, North-South Books (New York, NY), 1994.
- The Emperor's New Clothes (and author of introduction), by Hans Christian Andersen, illustrated by Angela Barrett, Walker (London, England), Candlewick Press (Cambridge, MA), 1997.
- Elf Hill: Tales from Hans Christian Andersen, illustrated by Emma Chichester Clark, Frances Lincoln (London, England), 1999.
- The Snow Queen, by Hans Christian Andersen, illustrated by Christian Birmingham, Walker Books (London, England), 2007.
- The Little Mermaid, by Hans Christian Andersen, illustrated by Christian Birmingham, Walker Books (London, England), 2009.

=== Works anthologized ===
- Christina Rossetti (poems) (and author of introduction), written by Christina Rossetti, E. Hulton (London, England), 1959.
- The Best Children's Books of . . ., six annual volumes, Hamish Hamilton (London, England), 1963–69.
- Emily Brontë, A Peculiar Music (poems), (and annotator and author of introduction) Bodley Head (London, England), Macmillan (New York, NY), 1971.
- Fantasy Books for Children (short essays on over two hundred books) (and annotator), National Book League (London, England), 1975, new edition, 1977.
- Edith Nesbit, Fairy Stories (and author of introduction and notes), illustrated by Brian Robb, E. Benn (London, England), 1977.
- The Silent Playmate (and author of notes and introduction) (collection of doll stories), illustrated by Harold Jones, Gollancz (London, England), 1979, Macmillan (New York, NY), 1981.
- A Footprint on the Air: An Anthology of Nature Verse (compiler and contributor), illustrated by Liz Graham-Yool, Hutchinson (London, England), 1983.
- Messages: A Book of Poems (Contributor and author of essay), Faber & Faber (London, England), 1985.
- Jacob and Wilhelm Grimm, Grimms' Fairy Tales, illustrated by Lidia Postma, Hutchinson (London, England), 1985, published as The Twelve Dancing Princesses and Other Tales from Grimm, Dial Books (New York, NY), 1986.
- William Shakespeare, A Midsummer Night's Dream, illustrated by Sylvie Monti, Hutchinson (London, England), 1988.
- Classic Fairy Tales to Read Aloud (Author of introductory accounts of each story), illustrated by Jo Worth, Kingfisher (New York, NY), 1996.
- Rocking Horse Land and Other Classic Tales of Dolls and Toys, illustrated by Angela Barrett, Candlewick Press (Cambridge, MA), 2000.

=== Essays ===
- Twentieth-Century Children's Writers, St. James Press (New York, NY), 4 volumes starting 1978.

=== Introductions ===
- King Arthur by Henry Gilbert, Robin Hood, by Louis Rhead, and eight other books in the 'Henry Holt Little Classics' series.
- The Princess and the Goblin by George MacDonald, Puffin Books 1964.
- The Eleanor Farjeon Book: A Tribute to her Life and Work, 1881–1965, illustrated by Edward Ardizzone. Hamish Hamilton 1966.
- Peter Pan by J.M. Barrie, Puffin Books 1967.
- East o' the Sun and West o' the Moon, translated by George W. Dasent, illustrated by P. J. Lynch, Candlewick Press (Cambridge, MA), 1995.
- The Fairy Tale of My Life by Hans Christian Andersen, Cooper Square Press, 2000.
