= Narottam Narayan =

Indian artist

Narottam Narayan Sharma (born 1896, died 1986 or 1992) was an Indian artist from Nathdwara. He is especially famous for his images of Krishna, which were popular throughout North India and were even more influential than the works of Raja Ravi Varma.

Several of his paintings of Krishna, Lakshmi, Sarasvati, Ganesha and Shiva were published as posters by S. S. Brijbasi, a firm based in Karachi in pre-independence India (from 1918 until Partition), using chromolithography, and printed in Germany.

Murli Manohar, the most recognisable painting of Narottam Narayan and a best-selling image.

Narottam Narayan's paintings marked a conscious return to a more traditional style of representation, wherein realism was less paramount than the images' iconic nature and engagement with the viewers. An "example par excellence" is his painting Murli Manohar (1934), which is reputed to be the best-selling image in the history of the industry. Other famous paintings of his, mass-produced by S. S. Brijbasi, include Shree Satyanarain (of Satyanarayana), Kailash Pati Shankar (of Shiva), depictions of Maharana Pratap and Shivaji, and images having to do with the independence struggle including portraits of Gandhi and Nehru, Mata ka Bandhan Mochan, and, painted after Gandhi's death, Gandhiji ki swargyatra (Gandhi's ascent to heaven).

His initial training was at Udaipur. He was an illustrious apprentice of Ghasiram Hardev Sharma (1868–1930), who was himself trained at Jhalawar. It is likely that, as with Ravi Varma, Narottam Narayan's training may have been influenced by landscapes in German and Austrian prints and postcards, via collections at the princely courts at Udaipur and Jhalawar. The Nathdwara painters played a part in the evolution of Mewar painting.

Ghasiram was both chief painter and head of photography for the Shrinathji temple in Nathdwara. Narottam Narayan adopted a practice of combining painting and photography in his image-making process, possibly either using photographs as a model or overpainting them.

As with other artists of the Nathdwara school, his paintings are characterised by a photographic treatment of figures (especially faces), in the sense that he replicated the tones of black-and-white photography, such as giving a grey tinge to his Murli Manohar. The goal was to make "the divine accessible to the devotees as an empathetic presence".

When his painting was used in 1928 for the first printed reproduction of the Shrinathji image, the artists of Nathdwara boycotted him, as they were opposed to mass reproduction fearing that it would affect their earnings. Eventually, they realised that mass production would bring greater awareness, demand, income, and fame.

Narottam Narayan was also an early influence on B. G. Sharma (also from Nathdwara), who later broke away to evolve his own style.
