= Joxantonio Ormazabal =

Spanish writer

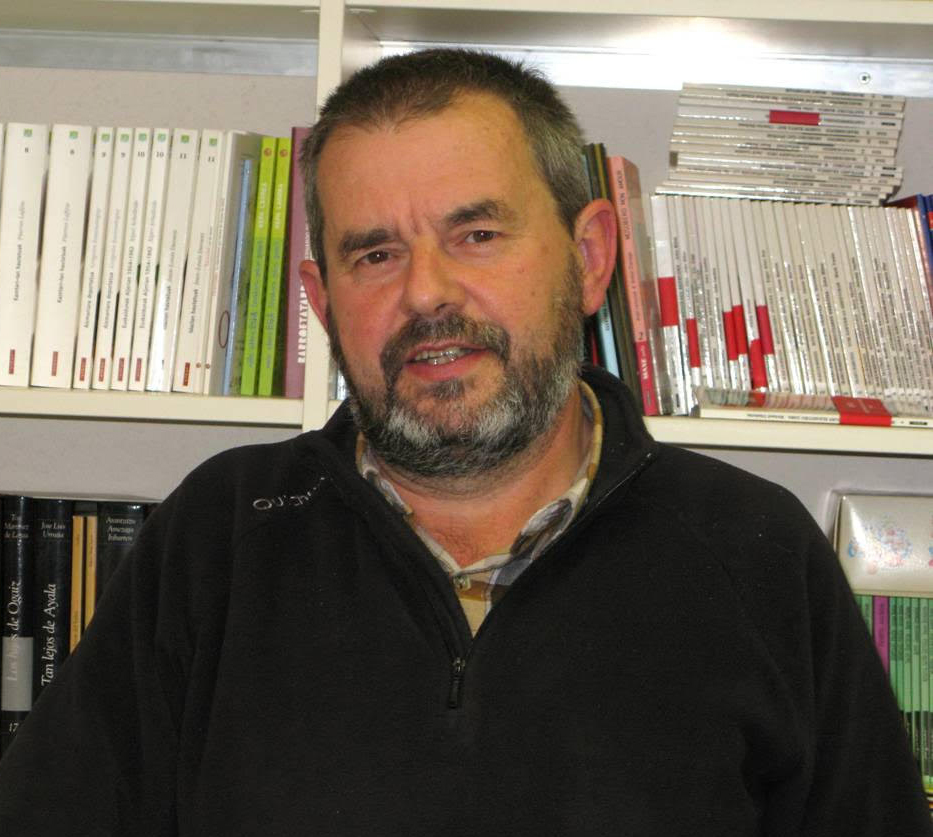
- Born: Joxantonio Ormazabal Berasategi; 1948 Zegama, Spain
- Died: 2 May 2010 (aged 61–62) Zegama, Spain

Joxantonio Ormazabal (1948–2010) was a Basque and Spanish author of primarily children's literature in the Basque language. He also published under the pen name of Joxean.

== Early life ==
Joxantonio Ormazabal was born in 1948 to a Basque family in Zegama, a part of the Basque Autonomous Community of Spain. At the age of 12, he joined a seminary in Saturrarán, and later studied at a seminary in San Sebastián. He later left the seminary to become a teacher. In an interview with Argia magazine in 2009, he stated, "I do not remember reading tales. My mother told me stories. I remember the characters of Peru and María, but I did not grow up among books."

== Career ==
At the age of 23, Ormazabal became a teacher at a private school called Salbatore Mitxelena Ikastola in Zarautz. He worked with authors such as Anjel Lertxundi, Mariasun Landa, and Juan Martin Elexpuru. His first book was published under the pen name "Joxean". While working as a teacher, Ormazabal composed the lyrics of songs by Imanol Urbieta, such as Astoa ikusi nuen, Azokan, and Tximeleta mendian.

Ormazabal later taught at Alkartasuna High School in Beasain.

Ormazabal left teaching and became an editor at Elkarlanean Publishing House in 1981, where he worked in the field of children's and young people's literary collections as well as textbooks. He published his first work, Fernando Smezketarra. In addition to writing, Ormazabal was responsible for the children and youth departments at Elkar Publishing House until his supposed retirement in 2009. He continued his work in children's literature by editing and occasionally translating important works.

Ormazabal's prose work focused on humor and fantasy. Also, Ormazabal published works tackling topics such as freedom (Kaiolatik Mendira, 1986), poverty, and discrimination (Kittano, 1995), relations between grandparents and grandchildren (Aitona parapentean, 2004), and ecology (Txoria zezenaren adar gainean, 1999).

Poetry played a prominent role in Ormazabal's body of work. He was a finalist in the Euskadi Literary Prize for Children and Youth Literature in 2008 for the poem 'Ilunorduak eta Argilaurdenak' (2007).

Ormazabal's titles include Zirkua amets (2009), Kaskarintxo (1983), Margolin (1983), Pernando Amezketarra (1981), and Kittano.

== Death ==
Ormazabal died on 2 May 2010 in Zegama, Spain, after falling into a well. His body was found at the vent of the Oazurza tunnel on the Madrid-Irún railway line.

== Books ==
- Ehun ipuin hitz gutxitan Donostia: Elkar, D.L. 2010. ISBN 9788497838320, OCLC 863181345
- Aitona eta amona udalekuetan Donostia: Elkar, 2008 ISBN 9788497835688
- Ilunorduak eta argilaurdenak Donostia Elkarlanean, 2007. ISBN 9788497835145, OCLC 433392926
- Aitona parapentean (2004, Elkar)
- Antonio Bolas (2002, Elkar)
- Hiztegi jolastia (2002, Elkar)
- Bihotza zubi Donostia: Elkarlanean, L.G. 2001. ISBN 9788483317389, OCLC 863165188
- Josebiñe (2001, Elkar)
- Irri eta barre (2001, Elkar)
- Kotti (2001, Elkar)
- Amona Bizikletan (2000, Elkar)
- Bi indar txiki inauterietan (2000, Elkar)
- Koxmeren gezurrak (2000, Elkar)
- Helikopteroa ikastolan (2000, Elkar)
- Gorritxo eta Beltxiko (2000, Elkar)
- Amona Bizikletan (2000, Elkar)
- Txoria zezenaren adar gainean (1999, Elkar)
- Saturna (1999, Elkar)
- Patxibusa (1998, Elkar)
- Azenalian erraldoia (1998, Elkar)
- Nola ibili munduan, ohetik jaiki gabe (1998, Elkar)
- Txoko txiki txukuna (1998, Elkar)
- Olentzeroren oparia (1998, Elkar)
- Haizemari (1998, Elkar)
- Zipriztin (1996, Elkar)
- Lazkao Txiki (1995, Elkar
- Kittano (1995, Elkar)
- Hitzak jostailu (1994, Elkar)
- Pernando Amezketarra (1994, Elkar)
- Esaera zaharrak eta txiste berriak (1994, Elkar)
- Maripertxenta (1993, Elkar)
- Esaera zaharrak (1990, Elkar)
- Txisteak (1990, Elkar)
- Igarkizunak (1990, Elkar)
- Kiriko eta bere sendia (1989, Elkar)
- Honela bizi naiz ni (1986, Elkar)
- Auto, asto train (1986, Elkar)
- Kaiolatik mendira (1986, Elkar)
- Margolin (1983, Elkar)

Translations

- Joles egiteko ipuinak (Gianni Rodari)
- Ilargia edan zuen astoa (Renata Mathieu)
- Tone, haria eta armiarma (Antoni Cuadrench)
- Koloreak (Enric Larreula)
- Izei txikia (M. Eulàlia Valeri)
- Mister Daffodil eta bere denda (Asun Balzola)
