= Iturbe =

Iturbe may refer to:

- Iturbe, Jujuy, Argentina
- Iturbe, Paraguay

== People with the surname ==
- Antonio Iturbe (born 1967), Spanish writer
- Iker Iturbe (born 1976), Spanish professional basketball player
- Juan Iturbe (born 1993), Argentine-born Paraguayan professional footballer
- Lola Iturbe (1902–1990), Spanish anarcho-syndicalist
- Lucílo Iturbe (1907–1997), Mexican Olympic sprinter
- Arantxa Iturbe (born 1964), Basque journalist, announcer and writer

== See also ==
- Iturbide (surname)
