= The Witch's Garden (disambiguation) =

The Witch's Garden may refer to:

- The Witch's Garden, a children's picture book written and illustrated by Lidia Postma
- The Witch's Garden Series, a book series written by C. S. E. Cooney
- "The Witch's Garden", an episode of the TV series Adventure Time

== See also ==
- The Good Witch's Garden, a Hallmark Channel television film
