= Lee Gi-hun =

South Korean painter and picture book author

Lee Gi-hun (Korean: 이기훈) is a South Korean painter and picture book author.“Lee” is his surname. In 2013 his book Tin Bear was awarded the Children's Jury Prize at the Biennial of Illustration Bratislava (BIB)

== Works ==
- 2021 09:47, Gloyeon
- 2016 Egg, BIR
- 2014 Big Fish, BIR
- 2012 Tin Bear, Rejam
- 2012 Rani, written by Park Deok-kyu, illustrated by Lee Gi-hun, Rejam

== Career ==
In addition to his work as a picture book author, Lee Gi-hun has established an international career as a painter.

He has held solo exhibitions including Prometheus & Pietà at The Hole in New York, Gaze at Galleri Christoffer Egelund in Copenhagen, Pietà at Dorothy Circus Gallery in Rome, and Masquerade at StolenSpace Gallery in London.

In 2024, he performed a live painting performance at the Korea House during the 2024 Paris Olympics, presenting his Masquerade series.

He was featured as a limited edition cover artist in Hi-Fructose Magazine Volume 72.

== Exhibitions ==
=== Solo exhibitions ===
- 2026 – Prometheus & Pietà, The Hole, New York
- 2025 – Gaze, Galleri Christoffer Egelund, Copenhagen
- 2025 – Pietà, Dorothy Circus Gallery, Rome
- 2024 – Masquerade, StolenSpace Gallery, London

== Activities ==
- 2023 WONDER: Wordless Picture Books by 7 Artists from South Korea, Brisbane Writers Festival, Exhibition and Interview
- 2023 Lee Gi-hun Live Painting and Picture Book Seminar, Bologna Children's Book Fair
- 2022 Exhibition of Original Artwork from Lee Gi-hun's Picture Books, Book Talk and Live Painting by Lee Gi-hun, Busan Library
- 2015 Exhibition of Picture Book Tin Bear, Guadalajara International Book Fair
- 2013 Exhibition of BIB Children's Jury Prize Winner Tin Bear, Biennial of Illustration Bratislava
- 2009 Exhibition of Selected Illustrator of the Year's Tin Bear, Bologna Children's Book Fair
