= Cho Eunyoung =

South Korean author

- Born: Seoul, South Korea
- Occupations: Author, illustrator
- Writing career
- Language: Korean, English
- Genre: Picture Books
- Website: instagram

Cho Eunyoung (Korean: 조은영; born 1981) is a South Korean picture book author. Her book Run Toto! won the Biennial of Illustration Bratislava (BIB) Grand Prix in 2011.

== Works ==
=== Illustration ===
- 2021 The Words I Want to Hear Most (Illustrated by Cho Eunyoung / Written by Huh Eun-mi), Flying Star, ISBN 979-11-88574-22-3
- 2016 I Love Vegetables (Illustrated by Cho Eunyoung / Written by Lee Rinhae), Gilbut Kids, ISBN 978-89-5582-367-7
- 2015 Seashell Meadow (Illustrated by Cho Eunyoung / Written by Chae In-sun), Sigong Junior, ISBN 978-89-527-8151-2
- 2012 Now is the Best Time (Illustrated by Cho Eunyoung / Written by Woo Soon-gyo), Woongjin Junior, ISBN 978-89-01-15098-7
- 2006 Welcome, Joy (Illustrated by Cho Eunyoung / Written by Chae In-seon), Aji Books, ISBN 89-958752-2-4

=== Text and illustration ===
- 2022 Are We Still Friends? (Written and illustrated by Cho Eunyoung), Sakyejul, ISBN 979-11-6094-977-3
- 2010 Run Toto! (Written and illustrated by Cho Eunyoung) Borim, ISBN 978-89-433-0817-9
  - 2013 La course, Éditions MeMo, France
  - 2013 Hashire Toto!, Bunka Gakuen Bunka Shuppankyoku, Japan
