= Yok Yok =

Children's animation series

Yok-Yok is the title of a children's TV animation created by Swiss/American illustrator Étienne Delessert for the Swiss Television. A series of comic strip books was adapted from the films and published by Gallimard Jeunesse in 1979, followed by an anthology of Yok-Yok stories in 1981. A new series of Yok-Yok books in English was published by Creative Education (Mankato MN) in 1993. Yok-Yok books have been translated into 11 languages, with pirated editions published in Iran. A new and original series of 5 books was created by Delessert and published in French by Gallimard in the spring of 2011.

Yok-Yok is distinguished by his large red triangular bouffant hat. The broadcast animation was translated from the French and shown on British TV from 1981 until 1983. It was broadcast at this time in various other countries including France. Storybooks featuring E. Delessert's character are still available, as well as a CD featuring music by Henri Dès.
