= Eva Bednářová =

Czech printmaker and illustrator

Eva Bednářová (8 May 1937 – 6 December 1986) was a Czech printmaker and illustrator.

Born in Prague, Bednářová was a graduate of Prague's University of Applied Arts. Throughout her career she produced illustrations for more than 40 books over three decades. Her illustrations for Chinese Fairy Tales by Dana and Milada Šťovíčková won the Grand Prix at the Biennial of Illustration Bratislava in 1969. Two of her prints are in the collection of the National Gallery of Art. She is also represented in the collection of the University of Iowa Stanley Museum of Art.

== Select bibliography ==
- Hermína Frankova, Blázni a Pythagoras. Dívčí román, ilustrovala Eva Bednářová, Praha, 1966.
- Olga Scheinpflugová, Pohádky, ilustrovala Eva Bednářová, Praha: Mladá fronta, 1971
- Dana and Milada Št́ovíčková (retold by) and translated into English by Alice Denešová, Chinese Fairy Tales, illustrated by Eva Bednářová, Feltham: Hamlyn, 1969.
