= Asun Balzola =

Spanish artist (1942–2006)

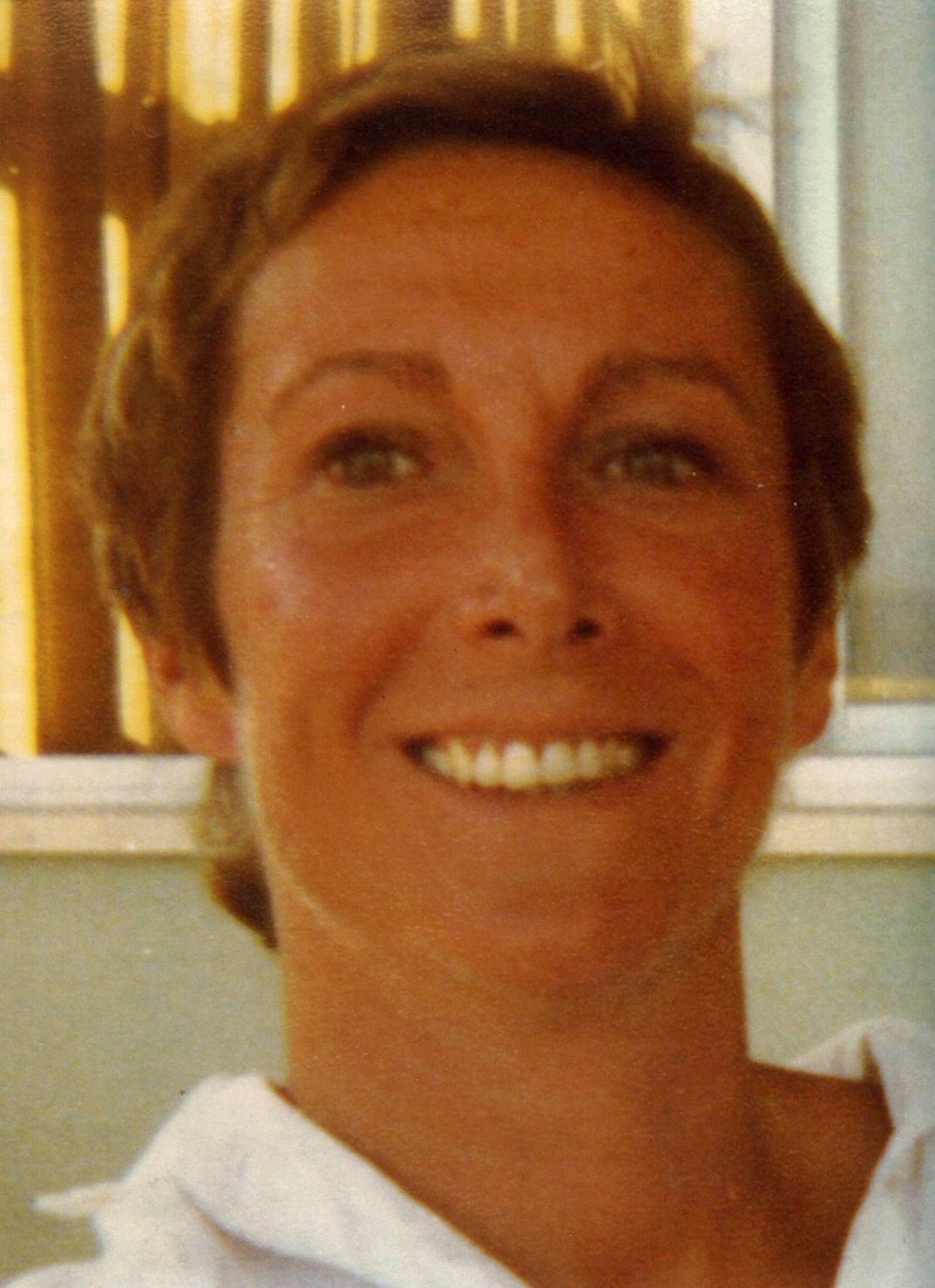
- Born: Asunción Balzola Elorza; 18 July 1942; Bilbao (Biscay), Spain
- Died: 22 June 2006 (aged 63); Madrid, Spain
- Education: Real Academia de Bellas Artes de San Fernando
- Writing career
- Language: Basque, Spanish
- Genres: illustrator, writer, translator
- Notable awards: Lazarillo Prize; National Illustration Prize

Asunción Balzola Elorza (18 July 1942 in Bilbao – 22 June 2006 in Madrid), better known as Asun Balzola, was a Spanish autodidact illustrator, writer and translator. After partially recovering from a severe car crash, she studied painting and graphic arts at the Real Academia de Bellas Artes de San Fernando in Madrid. Balzola worked in advertising and graphic design, in addition to her work in the fine arts. Among other awards, she received the Lazarillo Prize for her illustrations and has twice earned the Spanish National Illustration Prize.

Asun Balzola's illustration style is best known for the use of color blotches and thick lines (frequently painting using a watercolour technique). Her files and library were donated, posthumously, to the Centro de Documentación Infantil of the Central Library at San Sebastián. (Note: See, for instance, Diario Vasco, 2007-07-19.)

== Selected works ==
=== Some works illustrated by Asun Balzola ===
- Las noches del gato verde, by Elizabeth Mulder. Anaya. 1962.
- Cancionero infantil universal, by Bonifacio Gil. Aguilar. 1965. Lazarillo Prize.
- La niña sin nombre, by J. L. García Sánchez and M. A. Pacheco. Altea. 1978. (Girl with no name. Methuen, 1979.)
- El niño y el robot, by J. L. García Sánchez and M. A. Pacheco. Altea. 1978. (Boy and his robot. Methuen, 1979.)
- Platero y yo, by Juan Ramón Jiménez. Bruguera. 1980.
- Zuecos y naranjas, by Montserrat del Amo. La Galera. 1981.
- La bruja doña Paz, by Antoniorrobles. Miñón. 1981.
- Txitoen istorioa, by Bernardo Atxaga. Golden Award, Bratislava Biennale. 1985.
- La cacería, by Bernardo Atxaga. Altea. 1986.
- Celia en la revolución, by Elena Fortún. Aguilar. 1987.
- Un montón de Unicornios, by Ana Maria Machado. SM. 1990.
- Papá ya no vive con nosotros, by Manuel Alonso. SM. 1992.
- Poemas para la pupila, by Juan Cruz Iguerabide. Hiperión. 1995.
- El primer gigante, by Teresa Durán. La Galera. 1995.
- Cuando los gatos se sienten tan solos, by Mariasun Landa. Anaya. 1997.

=== Some works written and illustrated by Asun Balzola ===
- Historia de un erizo. Miñón. 1978. Spanish National Illustration Prize.
- Munia y la luna (Apel·les Mestres Prize 1980). Los zapatos de Munia. Munia y el cocodrilo naranja. Munia y la señora Piltronera (Spanish National Illustration Prize 1985). Munia y los hallazgos. Destino. 1980–1988. (Munia and the moon. Munia and the red shoes. Munia and the orange crocodile. Munia and the day things went wrong, Cambridge University Press, 1988–1989.)
- Santino el pastelero. Destino. 1986.
- Ala de mosca. Pirene. 1989.
- La cazadora de Indiana Jones. SM. 1989.
- El niño dibuja la noche. Nada como los disfraces. Buscar a María. Scott Foresman. 1999.

=== Works for adult readers ===
- Txoriburu. Cabeza de chorlito, memoirs.
