= Angela Barrett =

British artist and illustrator

Angela Barrett (born 1955) is a British artist and illustrator. She has illustrated picture books, children's books and novels, including various fairytales.

== Life and career ==
Barrett grew up sewing and drawing. She attended Thurrock Technical College and worked in retail display. She then attended Maidstone art school and later the Royal College of Art. Barrett's first illustrated book was The King, the Cat and the Fiddle, published in 1983 and written by Yehudi Menuhin and Christopher Hope.

In 2013, stamps depicting novels by Jane Austen were illustrated by Barrett and released by Royal Mail for the 200th anniversary of the novel Pride and Prejudice.

=== Style ===
Barrett's work is mainly created using watercolor, gouache, colored pencils, and ink. She is known for her period pieces and the research she applies to her work. For the 1998 book Joan of Arc, she researched 15th-century art and illuminated manuscripts to create a visual style for the story, using motifs inspired by medieval French fabrics. She uses photographs as reference for her compositions.

Barrett works in a realistic style with distorted figures, proportions and perspectives. Joanna Carey for The Guardian stated Barrett's illustrations have "a stillness and a quiet atmospheric intensity..." Valerie Coghlan stated in The Oxford Encyclopedia of Children's Literature that Barrett's "slightly elongated figures and faces and distorted perspective are frequently used to heighten tension and impart a sense of mystery."

== Illustrated works ==
- The King, the Cat and the Fiddle (1983), by Yehudi Menuhin and Christopher Hope
- The Wild Swans (c. 1984) by Hans Christian Andersen
- The Dragon wore Pink (1985) by Christopher Hope
- Through the Kitchen Window (c. 1986) by Susan Hill
- The Snow Queen (1988) by Hans Christian Andersen, translated by Naomi Lewis
- Proud Knight, Fair Lady: The Twelve Lays of Marie de France (1989), translated by Naomi Lewis
- The Hidden House (1990)
- Snow White (1991), retelling by Josephine Poole
- The Witches and the Singing Mice (1993), by Jenny Nimmo
- Beware, Beware (1993), by Susan Hill
- The Ice Palace (1994), by Angela McAllister
- The Random House Book of Stories from the Ballet (1995) by Geraldine McCaughrean
- The Emperor's New Clothes (1997), by Hans Christian Andersen, translated by Naomi Lewis
- Joan of Arc (1998) by Josephine Poole
- Rocking Horse Land and Other Classic Tales of Dolls and Toys (2000), by Hans Christian Andersen, compiled by Naomi Lewis
- Through the Tempests Dark and Wild: a Story of Mary Shelley, Creator of Frankenstein (2003) by Sharon Darrow
- Anne Frank (2005) by Josephine Poole
- Beauty and the Beast (2006), retelling by Max Eilenberg
- The Snow Goose (2007 edition), by Paul Gallico
- Sylvie and the Songman (2009) by Tim Binding
- The Night Fairy (2010) by Laura Amy Schlitz
- The Strange Case of Dr Jekyll and Mr Hyde (2010) by Robert Louis Stevenson
- The Most Wonderful Thing in the World? (2015), by Vivian French
- A Christmas Carol (2015) by Charles Dickens
- The Restless Girls (2019) by Jessie Burton
- A Far Away Country (2022) by Ruth Boswell

== Awards and honors ==
- 1991 W. H. Smith Illustration Award for The Hidden House by Martin Waddell
- 1993 Shortlist for the Kate Greenaway Medal for Beware, Beware! by Susan Hill
- 1998 Nestlé Smarties Book Prize for Can It Be True?
