= Starý Kolín =

- Municipality
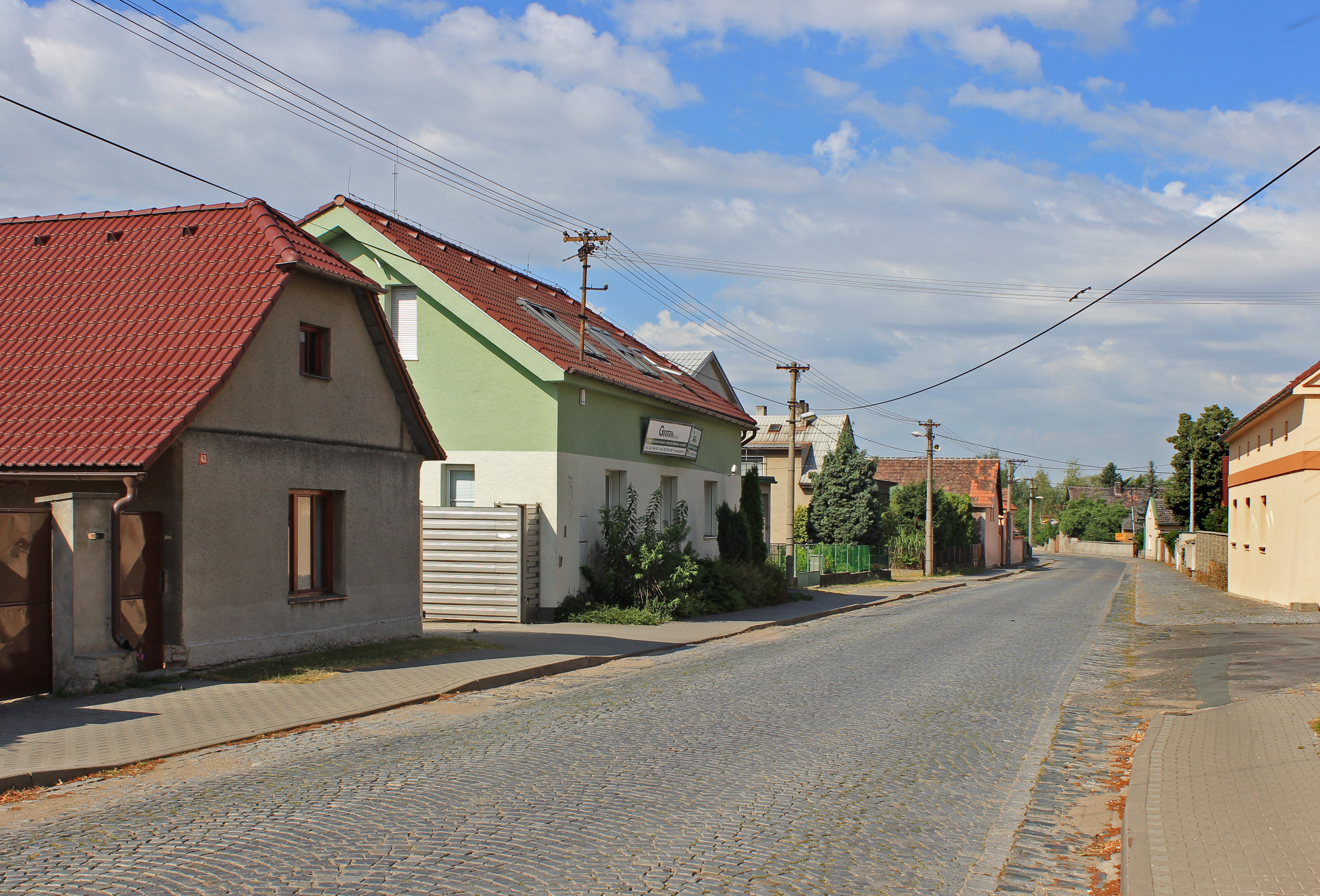
- Main street

- Flag Coat of arms

- Location in the Czech Republic
- Coordinates: 50°0′35″N 15°17′38″E
- Country: Czech Republic
- Region: Central Bohemian
- District: Kolín
- First mentioned: 1267

Area
  - Total: 8.79 km^{2} (3.39 sq mi)
- Elevation: 198 m (650 ft)

Population (2026-01-01)
  - Total: 1,654
  - Density: 188/km^{2} (487/sq mi)
- Time zone: UTC+1 (CET)
  - Summer (DST): UTC+2 (CEST)
- Postal code: 281 23
- Website: www.starykolin.eu

Starý Kolín is a municipality and village in Kolín District in the Central Bohemian Region of the Czech Republic. It has about 1,700 inhabitants.

== Administrative division ==
Starý Kolín consists of two municipal parts (in brackets population according to the 2021 census):

- Starý Kolín (972)
- Bašta (671)

== Etymology ==
The name Kolín probably comes from the Old Czech verb koliti, i.e. 'to hammer poles', and is related to the location of Starý Kolín in the often flooded area at the confluence of the Klejnárka and Elbe. The soil in the vicinity of the confluence was strengthened with the help of wooden poles.

== Geography ==
Starý Kolín is located about 52 kilometres (32 mi) east of Prague. It lies in a fertile landscape in the Central Elbe Table. It is situated on the left bank of the Elbe River, at the confluence of the Elbe and Klejnárka rivers.

== History ==
The first written mention of Starý Kolín is from 1267, when the Church of Saint Andrew was consecrated. Although it is documented later than Kolín, the prefix starý (i.e. 'old') indicates that it is older than Kolín. Starý Kolín was owned by various burghers until 1547, when Emperor Ferdinand I confiscated it and joined it to the Kolín estate.

== Demographics ==
Historical population

Year	Pop.	±%
1869	1,332	—
1880	1,398	+5.0%
1890	1,393	−0.4%
1900	1,349	−3.2%
1910	1,392	+3.2%

Year	Pop.	±%
1921	1,465	+5.2%
1930	1,504	+2.7%
1950	1,681	+11.8%
1961	1,710	+1.7%
1970	1,639	−4.2%

Year	Pop.	±%
1980	1,728	+5.4%
1991	1,536	−11.1%
2001	1,558	+1.4%
2011	1,617	+3.8%
2021	1,643	+1.6%

Source: Censuses

== Transport ==
Starý Kolín is located on the railway line Kolín–Česká Třebová.

== Sights ==
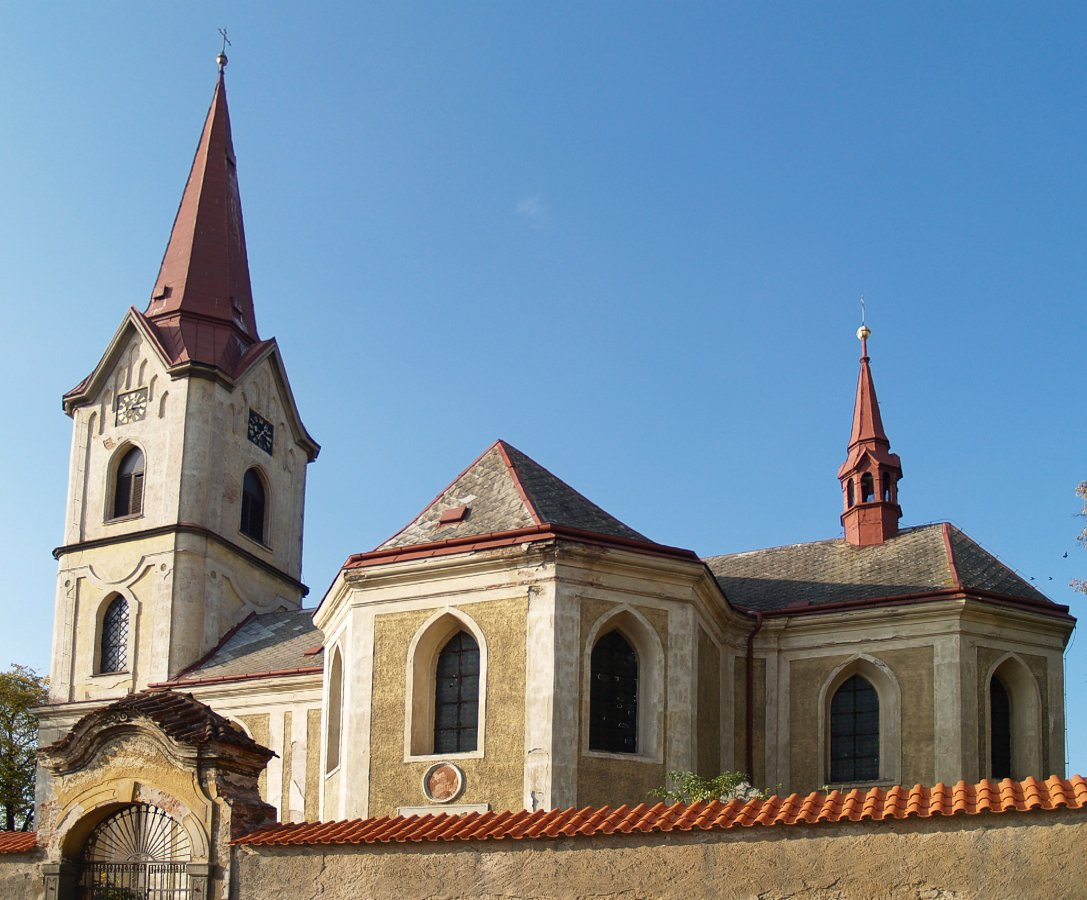
Church of Saint Andrew

The main landmark of Starý Kolín is the Church of Saint Andrew. The current church was built in 1731–1740, after the old church was destroyed by a fire.

== Notable people ==
- Josef Paleček (born 1949), ice hockey player and coach
