= Yasuo Segawa =

Japanese illustrator

- 瀬川康男
- Born: Segawa Yasuo; 5 April 1932; Okazaki, Aichi, Japan
- Died: 18 February 2010 (aged 77); Obuse, Nagano, Japan
- Education: Aichi Prefectural Okazaki North High School
- Known for: Illustration, printmaking, picturebook author,
- Awards: Biennial of Illustration Bratislava (1967 inaugural recipient)

Yasuo Segawa (瀬川 康男, Segawa Yasuo; 5 April 1932 – 18 February 2010) was a Japanese illustrator for children's books, born in Okazaki, Aichi.

He won the first grand prize in Biennial of Illustration Bratislava in 1967 for Taro and the Bamboo Shoot (ふしぎな たけのこ, Fushigina Takenoko) written by Masako Matsuno.

Segawa died on 18 October 2010 of rectal cancer at a hospital in Obuse, Nagano.

== Works ==
One of his books for babies is Peek-a-Boo (いないないばあ, Inai Inai Baa), published in 1967, which became a long seller in Japan, with more than 4,500,000 copies sold.

- Taro and the Bamboo Shoot (ふしぎな たけのこ, Fushigina Takenoko), text by Masako Matsuno
- "Peek-a-Boo" (いないないばあ), "Smily Face"（いいおかお）, "Sleepy Time"（みんなねんね） (R.I.C. Story Chest) RIC Publications; Har/Com版 2006, text by Miyoko Matsutani. Translation by Mia Lynn Perry
