= The Witch's Garden =

Children's book by Lidia Postma

First edition (publ. Lemniscaat)

The Witch's Garden is a children's picture book written and illustrated by Lidia Postma. It was first published in the Netherlands in 1978 under the title De Heksentuin, and was distributed in the United States by McGraw-Hill the following year.

== Plot summary ==
A group of children pass a little brick house on their way home from school each day. Trees cast ominous looking shadows upon an unruly, overgrown garden. The children believe the elderly woman who inhabits the house is a witch. In an attempt to frighten her, they create a monster costume from various household items they have collected. Their performance compels the woman to come outside and the children scramble in search of hiding places. She thanks them for the entertainment and invites them inside for a visit. Although the children are wary, they follow her into the kitchen. While the children fill their bellies with pancakes the woman has made for them, she recounts her girlhood encounters with a mysterious circus populated by elves and fairies. After they have finished their meal, the woman takes the children for a walk to a nearby pond. Much to their disbelief and amazement, they are introduced to some of the woman's otherworldly friends. When the children depart, they are unsure as to whether the day's events really took place or if they were imagined. However, they each return to their homes with a renewed sense of wonder and a newfound respect and fondness for the woman.

== About the author ==
Lidia Postma was born in Hoorn, the Netherlands in 1952. She is the author and/or illustrator of many children's books as well as fantasy books for adults.
