= Irene Rodrian =

German writer (1937–2025)

Irene Rodrian (12 November 1937 – 6 July 2025) was a German writer and screenwriter.

== Life and career ==
At her father's request, Rodrian was to study graphic design. Because she was rejected by the Munich Art Academy, she worked in the advertising industry for over two years. She then became self-employed as a graphic designer and advertising consultant. At this time, she began writing, but was unable to make a living from publishing her short stories and supported herself with jobs as a window dresser and salesperson.

In 1967, she anonymously submitted two manuscripts for her application for the Edgar Wallace Prize from Goldmann Verlag – "Death in St. Pauli" and "See You Tomorrow, Murderer" – and won first prize with "Death in St. Pauli." She sent the rejected manuscript to Heinrich Maria Ledig-Rowohlt, whose Rowohlt Verlag was just beginning to establish a German crime fiction scene with Hansjörg Martin, Friedhelm Werremeier, and Michael Molsner. The publisher accepted it. Irene Rodrian thus became the first German female crime writer.

By 1992, she had published approximately 20 crime novels with Rowohlt – and later with Heyne. She also wrote several screenplays for television films and series, such as Ein Fall für zwei, Hamburg Transit, Onkel Bräsig, and Tatort (TV series), as well as numerous children's and young adult books.

After a ten-year hiatus, she returned in 2002 with the crime novel Meines Bruders Mörderin (My Brother's Murderer). It was the start of a series about Llimona 5, a detective agency with five strong women based in the Catalan capital Barcelona.

Rodrian died on 6 July 2025, at the age of 87.

== Awards and honours ==
In 2007, Irene Rodrian was awarded the "Ehrenglauser" of the Friedrich Glauser Prize by the authors' group Das Syndikat (Authors) for her contributions to German crime fiction.

== Books ==
=== Crime novels ===
- 1967: Death in St. Pauli
- 1969: See You Tomorrow, Murderer
- 1970: Who Walks Barefoot Over Broken Glass
- 1971: Finder's Fee
- 1974: Kisses for the Gravedigger
- 1975: The Nice Murderers of Schwabing
- 1975: A Little Föhn, and You're Dead
- 1976: Death Takes a Break from the Heat
- 1977: You Live Temporarily on Sugarloaf Mountain
- 1977: Dead Cat (Stories)
- 1978: ...wears institutional clothing and is armed
- 1980: Sleep, Little Boy, Sleep
- 1981: Domestic Peace
- 1982: Plenty of Love
- 1983: Drop Shadow
- 1984: The Woman with the Jaguar
- 1985: Fist-Fisted
- 1986: The Girl with the Angel Face
- 1988: Over the Cliff
- 1988: With the Curtains Closed
- 1989: Eat, Bird, or Die!
- 1992: Beach Grave
- 2002: My Brother's Murderer
- 2003: Under the Spell of the Tiger
- 2005: Last Chapter
- 2006: Icy Silence
- 2006: Voices Under the Roof
- 2007: One Last Smile

=== Children's and Young Adult books ===
- 1965: Prima Prima Detectives
- 1966: Thieves Don't Like the Sun
- 1967: Good Friends, Great Adventures
- 1968: The Secret of the Island Fortress
- 1968: A Colorful Journey or The Strange Adventures of Dorothea Pfeffermarmelade
- 1969: The World in My Hand
- 1971: The Adventure with the Pink Seven
- 1971: One Witness Too Many
- 1972: The Man in the Shadow
- 1974: The Adventure with the Pink 7
- 1975: Good Luck, My Child
- 1976: Too Bad If That Guy Dies
- 1980: The Incredible Adventures of the Smallest Pirate on All the Seas and His Greatest Enemy, the Fat Captain
- 1981: My Father Is a Superman
- 1981: Pepper Jam
- 1982: Fantastic Adventures of the Smallest Pirate on All the Seas and His Greatest Enemy, the Fat Captain
- 1985: Fabulous Adventures of the Smallest Pirate on All the Seas and His Greatest Enemy, the Fat Captain
- 1987: Kiss Me, Convict
- 1994: I Want to Be a Lion
- 1998: Deadly Cool

== Filmography (selection) ==
Literary source material

- 1976: Einöd
- 2005: Letztes Kapitel

=== Screenplays ===
- 1972–1973: Die Melchiors
- 1977: Unendlich tief unten (with Pete Ariel)
- 1978: Eintypischer Fall
- 1979: Klärter und Beleg
- 1979: Tatort: Mitternacht, oder kurz nach
- 1979: Freundinnen (with Elke Heidenreich)
- 1979: Achtung Kunstdiebe (TV series, 3 episodes)
- 1981: Tatort: Das Lederherz
- 1982: The Trotzkopf
- 1982: A Case for Two (TV series, episodes: Overtime, Old Guns)
- 1994: Her Excellency the Ambassador (TV series, 1 episode)
- 1996: Pepolino and the Mermaid's Treasure – based on her novel
- 1997: Sophie – Smarter than the Police
