= Quint Buchholz =

German painter, illustrator and author

- Born: 28 July 1957 (age 69); Stolberg, Germany
- Education: LMU Munich; Academy of Fine Arts, Munich
- Known for: Painting; illustration

Quint Buchholz (born 28 July 1957 in Stolberg, Germany) is a German painter, illustrator and author. He is best known for his colorful, pointillist paintings that draw on techniques and motifs of magical realism, as well as his book illustrations and children's books for which he has won a number of awards.

== Early life and education ==
Quint Buchholz grew up in Stuttgart, where he attended high school. He then studied Art History at the LMU Munich from 1976 to 1977. From 1981 to 1986 he studied painting and graphic arts at the Munich Academy of Fine Arts, under the direction of professor Gerd Winner.

== Illustration ==
Quint Buchholz started working as an illustrator for the magazines P.M. in 1979 and TransAtlantik in 1985, as well as for the popular German newspaper Die Zeit, which published fifteen reprints of his pictures in a literary supplement in 1988 (Die Zeit Literatur No. 41, 7 October 1988). Among the first books with covers and book illustrations by Buchholz, which were published in 1986/87, was a German translation of Jonathan D. Spence's The Question of Hu. In the years that followed, he continued painting pictures which were used for German and international novels and children's books, among others by Katherine Scholes, Amos Oz, Jostein Gaarder, Lucy Hawking and Stephen Hawking, Takashi Hiraide and Luis Sepúlveda.

In 1991, author Gudrun Mebs and Quint Buchholz won a Gold Plaque at the Bratislava Children's Book Illustration Biennial (BIB’91) for Sara Wants to Join the Circus (Die Sara, die zum Circus will). Buchholz's breakthrough came between 1995 and 1997, when he illustrated two international bestsellers: Jostein Gaarder's Sophie's World, which ranked number 1 on the German magazine Der Spiegel’s bestseller list in 1995; and Nero Corleone by Elke Heidenreich, a book that became a bestseller in Germany and ranked 6th on the Spiegel's bestseller list of 1996. Nero Corleone was subsequently translated into 23 languages and received a number of awards, e.g. the Dutch children's book award Vlag en wimpel in 1997 and a Mildred L. Batchelder Award (Honors) in 1998.

Buchholz has illustrated over 40 works of German and world literature, and books with pictures by him are currently available in 25 languages. A newer example is „The Alchemy of Snowness", an autobiographically inspired book written by internationally known clown Slava Polunin and published in English in 2014, featuring 27 pictures by Buchholz.

The artist has created hundreds of paintings used for book covers, audio books, posters and advertisements, postcards, games, calendars and planners produced by a number of German publishing houses (e.g. Munich-based Carl Hanser Verlag, Ravensburger, Suhrkamp, Heye), as well as international publishing houses (among others, Random House, Macmillan/Farrar, Straus & Giroux, Beisler Editore, Éditions Milan, Nórdica Libros, CIP in China, and Grimm Press in Taiwan).

== Painting ==
Quint Buchholz works as a freelance painter in Munich, Germany.

Most of his paintings are painted in vivid colors, and the artist shows a preference for shades of blue as he frequently treats water, sky and night themes. Other commonly featured elements are animals (especially birds,) books, and boats. Most pictures are painted in acrylic or oil paint on paper or cardboard, over the course of weeks, during which the artist adds dot after dot with finer and finer brushes until an almost photographic quality is reached.

In terms of technique, Buchholz's paintings cite the traditions of photorealism and pointillism, while his topics and themes are also inspired by magical realism. His art, in which he creates a distinctly dreamy atmosphere that has inspired imitations by other artists such as Jungho Lee (winner of the World Illustration Award of 2016), has been called distinctly postmodern. The depicted elements, which can be read as elaborate and subtle symbolism, often tell stories with surprising messages revealing themselves only upon close scrutiny. Nevertheless, a number of critics have mentioned the fact that the pictures remain open for a variety of individual interpretations.

In many of his paintings, the artist addresses the complexity of human-animal relationships, but a frequent topic is also the range and ambivalence of human emotions, imagination and actions in a complex, often ironic world.

== Exhibitions ==
The first major exhibition of Buchholz's work took place in 1989 at the Wilhelmspalais in Stuttgart. Since then, his works have been exhibited at a variety of locations, among them the Gasteig Cultural Center in Munich (1995), the Ludwigshafen City Museum (1997), the museum Haus Löwenberg Gengenbach (1997), the Wilhelm Busch Museum (2002), the Literaturhaus Hamburg (2003) and Literaturhaus Munich (1998 and 2008), the International Youths’ Library at Blutenburg Castle in Munich (2007), Wackerbarth Castle near Dresden (2014), the Rosenheim City Museum (2016–2018) et al.

Buchholz is officially represented by the Rothweiler Gallery in Karlsruhe, where his paintings are always on display. However, he also has cooperations with a number of smaller and bigger galleries, cultural institutions, and bookstores in and around Munich, where he often gives readings and performances.

Since 1999 Buchholz has repeatedly been featured in exhibitions abroad, often organized by the Goethe Institute. For example, his works have been shown in Nancy and Strasbourg, France (1999), at the Taipei Fine Arts Museum in Taiwan (2000), the Goethe Institute in Thessaloniki, Greece (2007), as well as in Medellín and Bogotá, Colombia (2014), Klagenfurt, Austria (2014), and Pazin, Croatia (2017).

== Writing and awards ==
Buchholz has published a number of books as both author and illustrator. One of his best-known works is the children's picture book Sleep Well, Little Bear (1993), which was translated into 10 languages and won a New York Times „Outstanding Book of the Year" award in 1994. His book The Collector of Moments (1997) was listed as "One of the ten Best Illustrated Books of the Year" in the New York Times Book Review of 1999, won a Mildred L. Batchelder Award for the Best Foreign Children's Book in 2000, as well as the Italian „Bologna Ragazzi Award" (1998) and the French „Prix Enfantaisie" (1999).

In 1997, a group of international authors (T.C. Boyle, Susan Sontag, John Berger, Milan Kundera, Per Olov Enquist, Rafik Schami, Orhan Pamuk, Antonio Tabucchi, among others) wrote stories about 46 of Buchholz's pictures, to be published in Buchholz's anthology BookPictureBook. The book received one of the „Premios a los libros mejor editados en 2016", an award by the Spanish Ministry of Education, Culture and Sports.

Other major works are Quint's Life of Animals (Quints Tierleben, 2012), an anthology of international texts about animal-human relationships; a special edition of the Bible, The Bible in Images (Die Bibel in Bildern, 2010), which author Elke Heidenreich has written an extensive commentary about, and In the Land of Books (2013), a picture book about reading and books that received the Italian Premio Letteratura Ragazzi 36 award for the best-illustrated children's book in 2015.

Two books with pictures by Quint Buchholz were on the Honor Roll of the Hans-Christian-Andersen Award (1992 and 1996), and five books were shortlisted for one of the most important German literary awards, the German Children's Literature Award (Deutscher Jugendliteraturpreis) (1991, 1994 and 1995). Buchholz also received three awards from the German Foundation of Book Art (Stiftung Buchkunst) (1989, 1993 and 1995), and won five „Der Luchs" awards from Die Zeit/Radio Bremen between 1990 and 2004.

== Theater ==
Buchholz has worked as a stage designer in productions of "The Golem" (2005) and "Caligula" (2007) at the Munich Metropole Theater (director: Jochen Schoelch).

In 2008 a play version of Buchholz's book The Collector of Moments premiered at the Théâtre de Cornouaille in Quimper, France, under the direction of Jacques Nichet and starring Jacques Echantillon. Since 2011 the play has been a regular part of the program at the Munich Metropole Theatre and is usually performed from December through January.

== Teaching ==
Since 2008, Buchholz has been teaching painting and illustration at Irsee Monastery, as well as at the Academy of Fine Arts in Kolbermoor and the Bad Reichenhall Art Academy.

== Bibliography ==
- Helmut Kronthaler (ed.), Quint Buchholz. In: Lexikon der Illustration im deutschsprachigen Raum seit 1945. edition text + kritik, Munich, 2009, ISBN 978-3-8691-6191-4
