= Teresa García de Madero =

Mexican politician

María Teresa García Segovia de Madero (born 13 March 1946 in Monterrey, Nuevo León) is a Mexican politician affiliated with the National Action Party (PAN) who served as Mexican Ambassador to Canada, state congresswoman and municipal president of San Pedro Garza García.

García de Madero is a member of the PAN since 1984. From 1985 to 1988 she served as local deputy in the Congress of Nuevo León. 1997–2000 she was municipal president of San Pedro Garza García, Nuevo León. She has been a member of the PAN National Executive Committee.

President Vicente Fox designated her Mexican Ambassador to Canada to replace former incumbent Ezequiel Padilla. She was confirmed by the Senate in September 2001. She returned to Mexico in 2006.

She is married to Manuel Madero.

Preceded by Fernando Márgain Berlanga	Municipal President of San Pedro Garza Garcia, Nuevo León; 1997—2000	Succeeded by Gerardo Garza Sada
