= Stasys Eidrigevičius =

Lithuanian artist

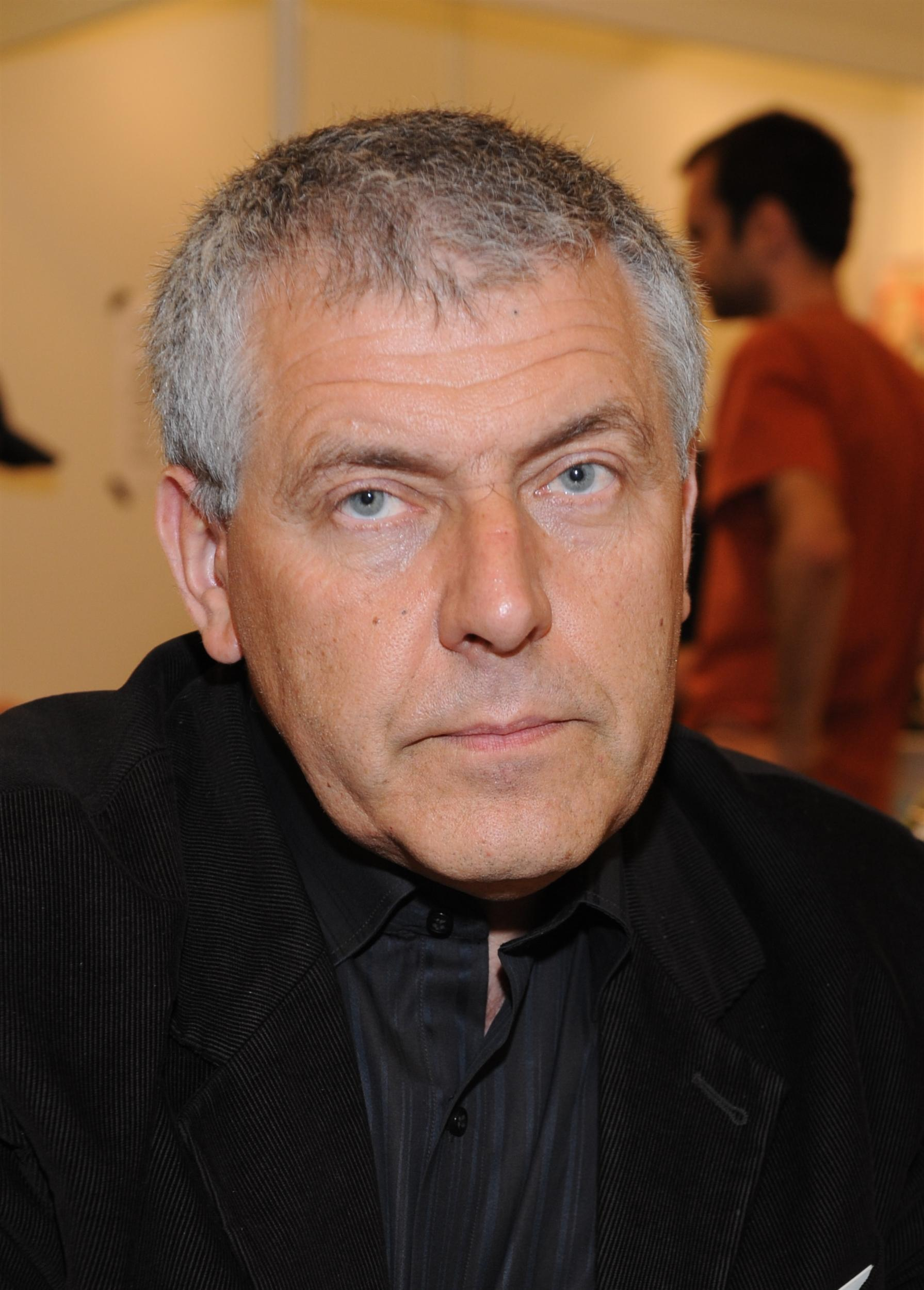
- Born: 24 July 1949 (age 77); Mediniškiai, Lithuania
- Education: Vilnius Academy of Fine Arts
- Known for: Graphic Design
- Notable work: Poster design
- Website: eidrigevicius.com

Stasys Eidrigevičius (born 24 July 1949 in Mediniškiai, Lithuania) is a painter and graphic artist.

== Biography ==
Eidrigevičius graduated from the College of Fine Arts and Crafts in Kaunas in 1968. In 1973, he obtained a diploma from Vilnius Academy of Fine Arts. Since 1980 he has lived in Poland. Eidrigevičius is active in many artistic fields, such as: oil painting, book-plate, book illustration, studio graphics, and photography. He has been interested in posters since 1984.

== Major awards ==
Major awards: Gold Plaque for children's book illustration at Biennial of Book Art in Bratislava, Czechoslovakia (1979, 1981, 1989), Grand Prix (1991); Gold Medal at International Biennial of Exlibris in Malbork (1980); Honorary Mention at Exhibition of Small Graphic Forms in Łódź, Poland (1979); Grand Prix for book illustration in Barcelona, Spain (1986); Grand Prix at International Biennial of Posters in Lahti, Finland (1989); 3rd Prize at International Biennial of Posters in Warsaw (1990), Gold Medal, Toyama, Japan (1994), 1st Prize at Biennial of Polish Poster, Katowice (1999), National Award in Arts, Lithuania (2001); Commander's Cross of the Order of Merit of the Republic of Poland (2019).

== Stasys Museum ==
A new Stasys Museum was opened in 2024 in Panevėžys, Lithuania showcasing the work of the artist.
