= Arantxa Iturbe =

Spanish Basque journalist and announcer

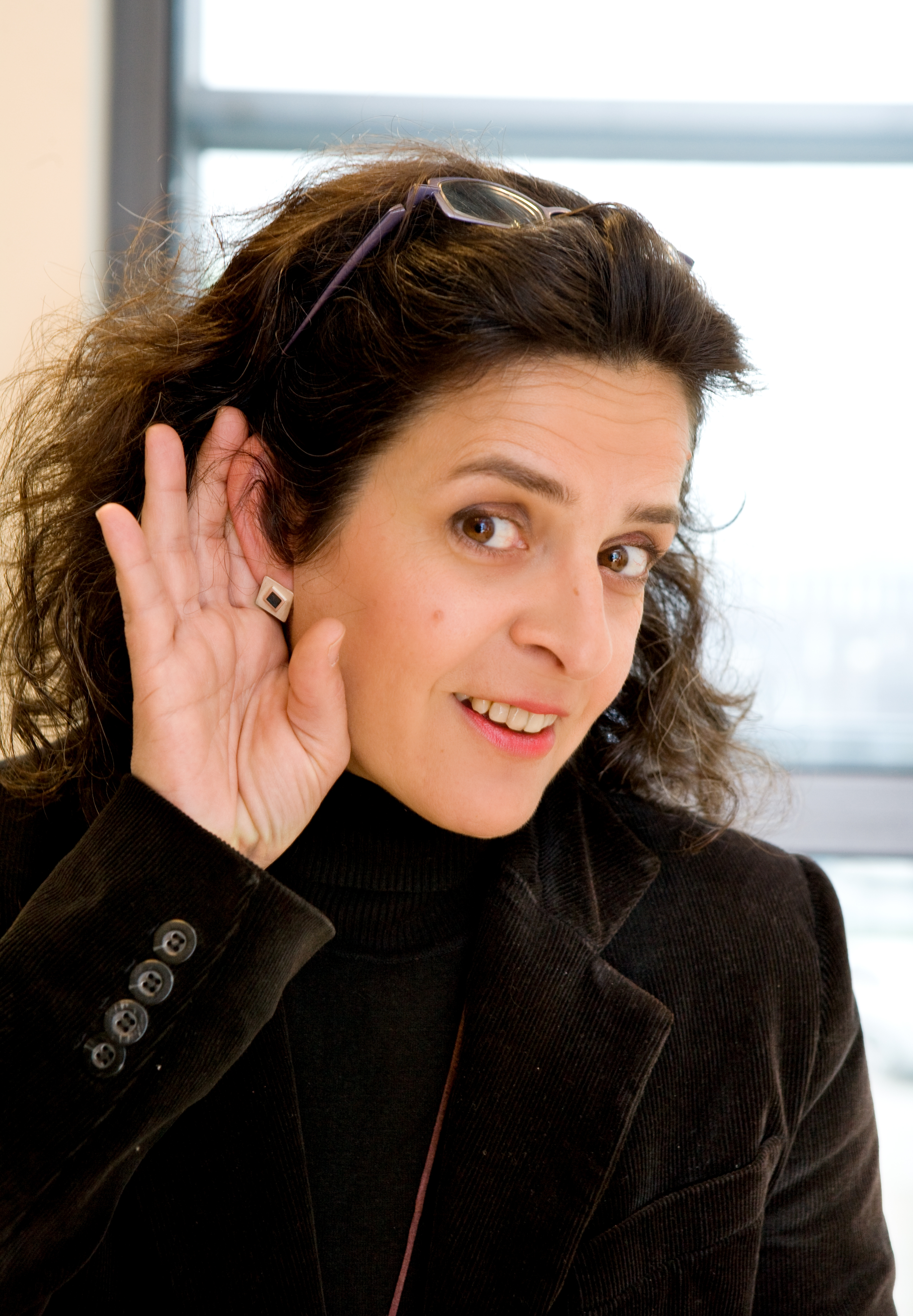
- Born: 9 June 1964 (age 62); Alegia, Guipúzcoa, Spain
- Writing career
- Language: Basque
- Notable awards: Rikardo Arregi journalism award

Arantxa Iturbe Maiz (born 9 June 1964), is a Basque journalist, announcer, and writer in the Basque language.

== Life ==
Arantxa Iturbe was born in Alegia, Guipúzcoa, and holds a degree in Media Studies from the University of Navarra. Since the 1980s, she has worked for Euskadi Irratia. In the 1990s, she wrote for the Basque newspaper and later in Gara. In 1992, she became known as a writer, when her play Maite, maite, maitea was published by the Basque Government. It was broadcast on radio as a radio soap opera.

In 1992, she published her first book of stories Ezer baino lehen. In 1995 she published her second book Lehenago zen berandu.

In the two storybooks, the main theme was interpersonal relationships and especially the love relationship, with women as the most prominent protagonists. In many of her stories she talks about the loneliness of couples, misunderstandings and jealousy. Her style is close to oral forms and has always been in favor of simple and direct prose. Interpersonal relationships are the main subject of her two books of stories, but relationships carried to extremes, with uncomfortable situations, the fruit of fate or bad luck.

In 1999, she published Ai, ama! (Oh Mum), in the form of the essay and in which she made some reflections on the inconveniences, doubts and satisfactions that maternity entails. This work, edited by Alberdania, was a success, and in 2001, Agurtzane Intxaurraga prepared a theatrical version, in collaboration with the writer.

In 2000, she received the Rikardo Arregi journalism award for her work as a speaker and conductor of the Goizean Behin program. In 2001, she published her first children's play "Nik eserita egiten dut eta zer?", and several have followed. This work has been translated into Castilian, Catalan, and Galician.

In the 6th edition of the Max Prizes, for the Performing Arts in Spain on 5 May 2003, she received the first prize in the category of best theatrical author in Euskera, for Ai, ama!

In 2006, she published the work Kontu-jaten with the vital testimonies of women born in the first decades of the twentieth century, mixing reality with fictional. The book is a transcription of their testimonies but a novelization of their lives.

== Works ==
Essays

- Ai ama! (1999, Alberdania)

Children's Literature

- Nik eserita egiten dut eta zer? (2001, Elkar)
- Amona basoan galdu zenekoa (2003, Elkar)
- Norak suhiltzaile izan nahi du (2003 Elkar)

Stories

- Ezer baino lehen (1992, Elkar)
- Lehenago zen berandu (1995, Alberdania)
- Bakarrizketan (2001, Alberdania): Kike Amonarriz, Pako Aristi, Harkaitz Cano, Andoni Egaña... recopilación de varios escritores y escritoras vascas.
- Kontu-jaten: gure herriko emakume eskarmentudunen mahaian (2006, Alberdania) ISBN 9788496643161, OCLC 863176472

Novels

- Koaderno zuria (2017, Elkar)

Theater

- Maite, maite, maitea (1-15) (1992, Eusko Jaurlaritza)
- Obras llevadas al teatro [editor]
- Kabaretztei (2017 Hika Teatroa)
- Gutun zuria (2016 Hika Teatroa)
- Ilargiaren bi aldeak (2011Hika Teatroa)
- Aitarekin bidaia (2009 Hika Teatroa)
- Zeta (2005 Alessandro Bariccoren obraren itzulpena eta egokitzapena)
- Chaplin tropela (1990 Hika Teatroa)

== Works in English ==
- One of her stories appears in the anthology "Five months at most in Ayerbe".
