= Tere A. Zubizarreta =

Tere A. Zubizarreta, (1937 – 2007) of Miami, USA worked in advertising, and was a community activist. She died of cancer on July 26, 2007.

== Early life ==
Tere A Zubizarreta was born in Cuba, and in the early 1960s emigrated to the United States.

Herself a product of change, Tere was displaced from her country by the Castro revolution in Cuba in 1959, arriving in the U.S. just in time to experience the Civil Rights and Women's movements of the 1960s and 1970s. Leaving behind a life and lifestyle that could never be replicated, she was undaunted by the realities of political exile, reinventing her roles as wife and mother, and embarking on a career that not only became a passion and successful business venture, but a catalyst for her future impact on the community.

== Advertising career ==
Zubizarreta began as a Cuban-American woman with no college degree in 1970s America. Tere's career in advertising started at McCann/Marshalk Advertising, where she started as a secretary and worked her way thru the agency's many departments. In 1976, she started Zubi Advertising Services in a rented office in Miami with one phone and a borrowed typewriter. In addition to a borrowed desk, a phone and a $465 retainer from her first client, she was armed with the vision that the Hispanic consumer segment would grow to help redefine American culture, and with a mission to help remove what she believed was the greatest barrier preventing minorities from participating in the American Dream: the blinding power of stereotypes. The agency eventually came to have over 122 employees, billings in excess of US$195 million, won many awards, and had a number of Blue Chip clients including American Airlines, Ford Motor Company, Lincoln Mercury, Winn-Dixie, JP Morgan Chase and SC Johnson. She had an interest in and understanding of the Hispanic market

== Family ==
Zubizarreta is survived by her husband Octavio, son Joe, daughter Michelle, grandchildren Charlotte and Michael, sister Annie Slatkoff, nephew Joshua Slatkoff and niece Jessica Slatkoff.

== Honors ==
Zubizarreta was the first Hispanic woman to be elected to the Board of Governors and Committee Chair of the United Way of America, and also served on the board of directors for the Orange Bowl Committee, Beacon Council and Miami Children's Hospital. She was a co-founder and former chairperson of FACE, Facts About Cuban Exiles. Zubizarreta received several awards for her contributions to the U.S. Hispanic advertising industry, the last being the Eduardo Caballero Lifetime Achievement Award - the industry's highest - from the Association of Hispanic Advertising Agencies. Other organizations that honored her include the Latin Business Association, the National Association of Hispanic Publications, the Women's Automotive Association International and Latin Business Magazine. Additionally, the legacy of the agency she founded in 1976 is featured in a collection of Hispanic Advertising History curated by the Smithsonian National Museum of American History. The agency is represented by a ship model made by Cuban “balseros” as well as early agency documents.

== Death ==
After a hard-fought battle with cancer, Tere died on July 26, 2007. Her legacy is rich on many levels... But it is the impact she had on family and friends, and the hundreds of employees, clients, and people whose lives she touched along the way – the ones who lovingly still refer to her as “Mama Zubi” – that serves as the most appropriate testimony to her kindness, compassion, and gift for honoring each and every individual.
