= Patxi Zubizarreta =

Spanish writer (born 1964)

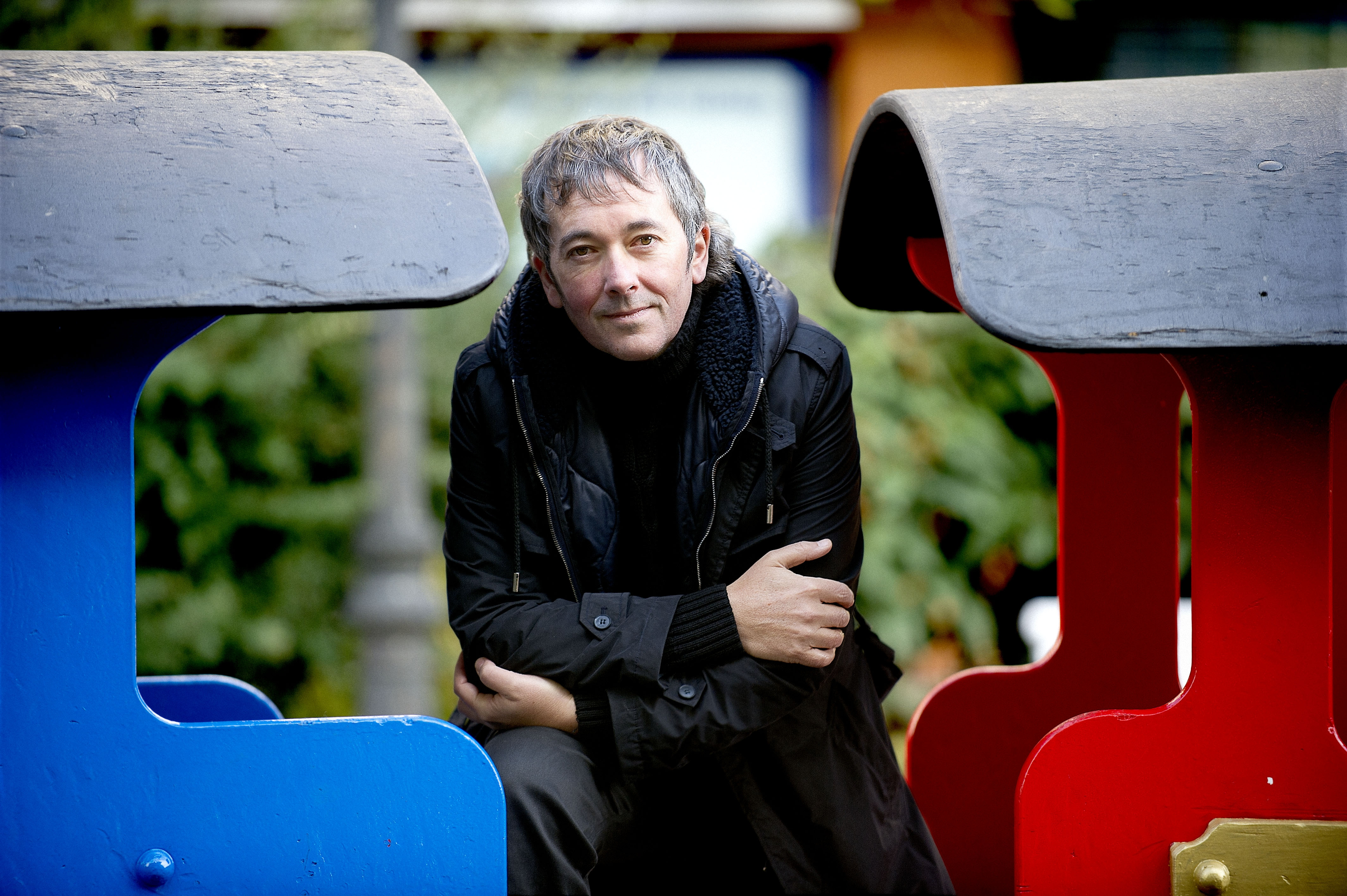
- Born: January 25, 1964 (age 62); Ordizia, Gipuzkoa
- Writing career
- Language: Basque
- Notable awards: Gizon izandako mutilates, Pantaleon badoa Xia Tenzinen Bidaia miresgarria

Patxi Zubizarreta (born 25 January 1964) is a Spanish writer who writes in the Basque language (Euskara). He studied Basque philology in Vitoria, where he currently resides. He is an author of children's and youth literature, a specialty in which he has won several prizes, has also been dedicated to translation and literature for adults and has a facet as creator of shows that combine music, image and literature. He was included in the White Ravens catalog and the IBBY Honor Roll.

== Life ==
Zubizarreta was born in Ordizia, Gipuzkoa. He published his first book in 1991, Ametsetako mutila, and has since published a long series of books of many different genres, especially stories inspired by the traditional world. Regarding the issues, he has prioritized the issue of immigration, especially between North Africa and Europe that explains in such a way that it can be understood by the children, as in the book Usoa.

His work has been translated into many languages, such as Castilian, Catalan, Galician, Asturian, Aragonese, English, Slovenian and Korean. Zubizarreta has also dedicated himself to translating Basque authors such as Abdela Taia, Najib Mahfuz, and Eric-Emmanuel Schmitt into Euskera.

In his role as a creator of poetic musical shows Flying over paper / Paperean Hegan, he presented at the International IBBY Congress held in London in collaboration with Galtzagorri Elkartea and the Etxepare Institute, and the show Ants, horses, Elephants / Inurriak, zaldiak, elefanteak, presented at the International Children's Book Fair in Bologna.

== Awards ==
Among the awards won by Zubizarreta Euskadi are three awards in the category of children's literature in 1998 with Gizon izandako mutilates, in 2006 with Pantaleon badoa and in 2010 with Xia Tenzinen Bidaia miresgarria.

== Works ==
- Eztia eta ozpina (1995, Alberdania)
- Gizon izandako mutila Premio Euskadi (1997, Pamiela)
- Usoa hegan etorritako neskatoa (1999, Erein)
- Jeans-ak hozkailuan (2000, Alberdania)
- Furia (2007, Erein)
- Pantaleon badoa Premio Euskadi (2007, Pamiela)
- Xia Tenzinen bidaia miresgarria (2009, Ibaizabal)
- Joan (2010, Txalaparta)
- Laranja bat zaborretan (2015, Elkar)
- Erantzuna haizean dabil (2016, Txalaparta)
