= Josef Paleček =

Czech ice hockey player

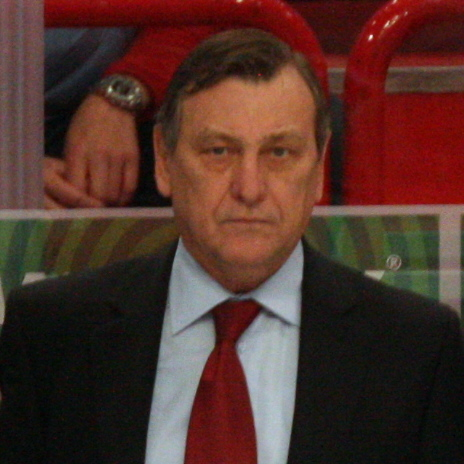
- Born: May 5, 1949 (age 76) Starý Kolín, Czechoslovakia
- Position: Forward
- Shot: Left
- Played for: Czech Extraliga; HC Pardubice; HC Dukla Jihlava; Austria; EHC Linz
- National team: Czech Republic
- Playing career: 1971–1987

Josef Paleček (born May 5, 1949) is a Czech former ice hockey player who is known as a head coach in the Czech Extraliga, and as an assistant coach for the Czech Republic men's national ice hockey teams at the 2006, 2007, 2008, and 2011 IIHF World Championships.

== International career ==
Paleček played with the Czech Republic men's national ice hockey team at the 1972, 1973, and 1974 World Ice Hockey Championships, where he help his team win gold, bronze, and silver medals.
