= Martin Leman =

English artist (born 1934)

- Born: 1934 (age 91–92); London
- Occupation: Painter
- Known for: Painting of Cats
- Spouse: Jill Leman

Martin Leman (born 1934) is an English artist who gained recognition for his paintings of cats. Since 1969 his works have been published in a number of books and international exhibitions.

== Early life ==
Martin attended art school in Worthing and the Central School of Art and Design in Holborn. He also spent time in Egypt on National Service duties.

== Career ==
Before starting his painting career in 1969 he worked as a graphic designer and taught at various institutions across London. His works on the subject of cats have appeared in over 20 books. He was elected as a member of the Royal Society of British Artists in 2007 and is also a member of the Royal Watercolour Society. As well as cats his works have focused on portraits of women and areas of Cornwall which have featured as a backdrop to much of his output.
