= Mariasun Landa =

Spanish writer (born 1949)

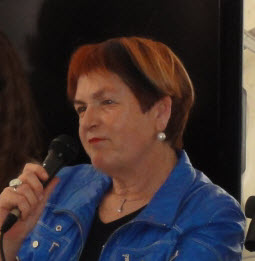
- Born: 5 June 1949 (age 77)
- Writing career
- Language: Basque
- Notable awards: Lizardi Prize for Children's Literature; National Prize for Children and Youth Literature; Eusko-Ikaskuntza Laboral-Kutxa Prize; Rosalía de Castro Prize

Mariasun Landa Etxebeste (born 5 June 1949 Rentería, País Vasco) is a Spanish writer. Most of her literary production has been developed in the Basque language in the field of children's and young people's literature. She is one of the writers in Basque language more translated to other languages.

== Life ==
After completing her studies as a social worker, she moved to Paris to learn French as an au pair and mastered the language, to study higher education at the Sorbonne, where she graduated in Philosophy in 1973. This period, immediately following the events Of May of the 68 was reflected in autobiographical pieces of her work The party in the next room. She also holds a degree in Philosophy from the University of Valencia.

On her return from France, she began to study Basque, since she had not learned in her native environment, despite being the language of her family. She then worked as a teacher of Basic Education for several years, in Zarauz, where she was also the director of the writer Anjel Lertxundi and in Lasarte-Oria. It was the lack of materials in Basque to be able to practice teaching, which boosted her literary activity. Later she worked in the Basque Language Service of the Teaching Staff (IRALE-Basque Government). Finally, she has been professor of Didactics of Literature at the University School of Teachers of Donostia (UPV / EHU).

Throughout her literary career, she has received numerous awards and prizes, among which the most traditional prize in Basque literature can be highlighted: Lizardi Prize for Children's Literature in Euskera with the story Txan Fantasma in 1982, and the Euskadi Award for Child and Youth Literature in 1991 with the work Alex. With elephant bird heart was selected for the list of Whitebirds 6 for the year 2001, that compiles the International Library of Children's Book and Juvenile of Munich. In 2003, she won the National Prize for Children and Youth Literature of the Ministry of Culture of Spain with the same work A crocodile under the bed originally written in the Basque language. And also the same work earned her the honorable mention in the Honor List of the IBBY (International Board on Books for Young People) in 2006. Previously, another work of hers, Iholdi, already had been credited in the same list in the year 1992. In 2004, the Association of Basque Publishers awarded the Bustintza Prize to one of the writers with the most sales in the Basque Book and Book Fair in Durango. In 2004, she won the Medal to the Merit Citizen granted by the City council of San Sebastián.

Since 2007, she is Member of number of Jakiunde, Academy of Sciences, Arts and Letters of the Basque Country. The OEPLI (Spanish Organization for Children's and Youth Book) has presented it as a candidate for the International Andersen Prize (considered the Nobel Prize for Children's Literature) in 2008 awarded by the IBBY. Elections in literary promoted by the Federation of Ikastolas of Navarra, was chosen as the most widely read author in the campaign JUUL for reading in 2010 with the book Festa aldameneko gellan, an autobiographical novel.

== Associations ==
The five associations in the Basque language : Basque Publishers (Eek, Euskal Idolle, Elkarteak), the Association of Writers (EIEk, Euskal Idazleen Elkarteak), Translators, Correctors and Interpreters (EIZIEk, Euskal Itzultzaile, Zuzentzaile eta Interpretarien Elkarteak), (APIE-EIEP, Euskal Irudigileen Elkarte Profesionalak), as well as the Galtzagorri Association of Basque Children's and Youth Literature (Galtzagorri Euskal Haur eta Gazte Literatura Elkarteak), awarded the Dabilen Elea prize in 2011, in Recognition to her work in Basque letters. In 2014, she received the Eusko-Ikaskuntza Laboral-Kutxa Prize for Humanities, Culture, Arts and Social Sciences for his contribution to Basque culture in the widest sense, having effectively contributed to the cultural development of Euskadi. The Basque Institute Etxepare in 2015 in the fifth edition of the course of the UPV / EHU " Excellence in Basque Studies " paid tribute to her being the writer in Euskera whose work has been translated into more languages. On 11 October 2016 the Galician PEN Center, dedicated to homage from the Galician language and literature the neighboring languages and literary systems: Hispanic, Basque, Catalan and Portuguese, awarded her the Rosalía de Castro Prize to Mariasun Landa for her work in Basque.

== Awards ==
- 1992, included in the IBBY International Board of Books for Young People, IBBY, for the book Iholdi .
- 2001, included in the White Raven list of Libraries for Children and Youth in Munich, by the book Elephant txori-bihotza
- 2002, the Tolosa City Council awarded him the Antonio Mª Labaien Prize for Krokodiloa ohe azpian, illustrated by Antton Olariaga.
- 2003, National Prize of Infantile and Juvenile Literature of Spain, also by the work Krokodiloa ohe azpian illustrated by Arnal Ballester .
- 2004 Vascos Publishers Association awarded the "Bustintza Prize" one of the best-selling writers in the XII Fair Durango Basque Book
- 2004, Prize to the Citizen Merit of the City council of San Sebastián and Medal of the City of Renteria.
- 2007 Appointed member of Jakiunde .
- 2008 . Nomination for the prize Hans Christian Andersen Prize (considered the Nobel Prize for Children's Literature) by the OEPLI (Spanish Organization for Children's and Juvenile Book)
- 2011 Euskal Idazleen Elkartea (EIE), Basque Association of Illustrators (APIE-EIEP), and Basque Association of translators, editors and interpreters, (EIZIE) and Galtzagorri Association.
- 2014 Eusko Ikaskuntza-Laboral Kutxa Award for Humanities, Culture, Arts and Social Sciences.
- 2015 Tribute Vasco Etxepare Institute in the V edition of the course "Excellence in Basque Studies" as the author in Euskera whose work has been translated into more languages
- 2016 Rosalía de Castro Prize of the Association of writers PEN of Galicia of the Association of Writers PEN of Galicia.

== Works ==
- Amets uhinak 1982
- Kaskarintxo 1982
- Elisabete lehoi domatzailea 1983
- Joxepi dendaria 1983
- Partxela 1984
- Ghost txan 1984
- Izar berdea 1985
- Aitonaren txalupan 1988
- Errusika 1988
- Iholdi 1988
- Izeba txikia 1988
- Maria eta ateria 1988
- Alex 1990
- Irma 1990
- Kleta bizikleta 1990
- Potx 1992
- Juliet, Romeo eta saguak 1994
- Nire eskua zurean 1995
- Ahatetxoa eta sahats negartia 1997
- Katuak bakar-bakarrik sentitzen direnean 1997
- Amona, zure Iholdi 2000
- Sorgina eta maisua 2000
- Elephant txori-bihotza 2001
- Galtzerdi suizida 2001
- Krokodiloa ohe azpian 2002
- Marlene eta taxizapata 2002
- Inurri bitxia 2004
- Marine 2005
- Haginak eta hilobiak 2005
- Festa aldameneko gelan 2007
- Ipurtargiak paradisuan 2010
- Aitonaren txalupan 2011
- Maitagarria eta desioa 2012
- Marikanta eta inurriak 2012
- Inurrien hiztegia 2013
- Elsa eta paradisua 2015
- Puertas y ventanas abiertas 2016
- Azken Balada 2016

== Works in English ==
- (Errusika) The dancing Flea 1996
- (Txan fantasma) Karmentxu and the little Ghost 1996
- (Berri ona) Good news 2003
- (Inurri bitxia) An original ant 2004
- (Izar berdea) The green star 2005
