= Étienne Delessert (illustrator) =

Swiss illustrator (1941–2024)

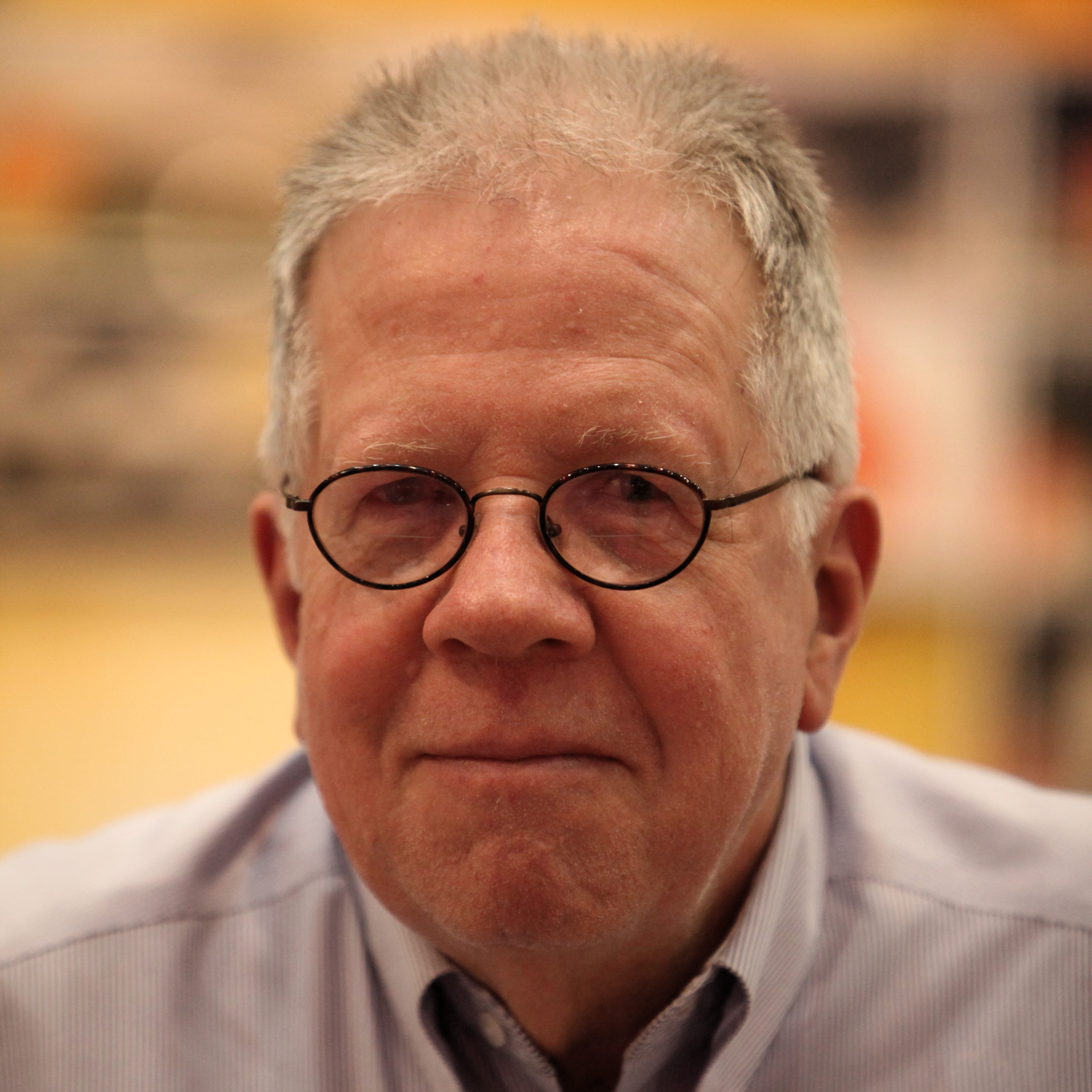
- Delessert in 2011
- Born: 4 January 1941; Lausanne, Switzerland
- Died: 21 April 2024 (aged 83)
- Notable work: Yok-Yok; Stories 1,2,3,4
- Awards: Society of Illustrators

Étienne Delessert (4 January 1941 in Lausanne – 21 April 2024 in Lakeville) was a Swiss self-taught graphic artist and illustrator. He is largely known for his animated series Yok-Yok and his collaboration with Eugène Ionesco, on Stories "1" and "2", as well as his work with child psychologist Jean Piaget.

His work focused on expanding the child's mind through the use of strange stories often designed to make children ask questions. He considered himself first and foremost a story teller. His creative process involved mostly digital media in combination with hand sketching.

For his lasting contribution as a children's illustrator, Delessert was a finalist for the biennial, international Hans Christian Andersen Award in both 2006 and 2010.

Delessert died from cancer on 21 April 2024, at the age of 83.

== Career ==
Delessert had children's book published and translated in over 14 different languages. He also had illustrations published in TIME magazine. Delessert animated segments for Sesame Street, like one about a woman's face morphing. Additionally, in 1973 Delessert illustrated a children's book based on the lyrics to "Being Green", a popular song written by Joe Raposo, originally performed by Jim Henson as Kermit the Frog on both Sesame Street and The Muppet Show. Although released as a Sesame Street book, the large hardcover book does not feature Kermit the Frog or other characters from the series. Rather, the song's lyrics are enacted by an undefined, dinosaur-like being. The illustrations also do not feature any other traditional Sesame Street characters and are of a psychedelic nature. The book has been out of print since 1973. He also created the animated series Yok Yok for Swiss television.

== Published Works ==
- How the Mouse Was Hit on the Head by a Stone and So Discovered the World, 1971 with Jean Piaget
- Ogden Nash's Zoo, 1987 with Ogden Nash
- Food, 1989 with Ogden Nash
- Silly Stories 1, 2, 3, 4 with Eugene Ionesco
- and Jean Piaget (How The Mouse...), to his more recent award-winning A Long Long Song; Ashes, Ashes; Dance!; The Seven Dwarfs; Who Killed Cock Robin?; Humpty Dumpty; Big and Bad
- The Seven Dwarfs, 2002
- Moon Theater, 2009
- Night Circus, 2015
