= Biennial of Illustration Bratislava =

International honor for children's book illustrators

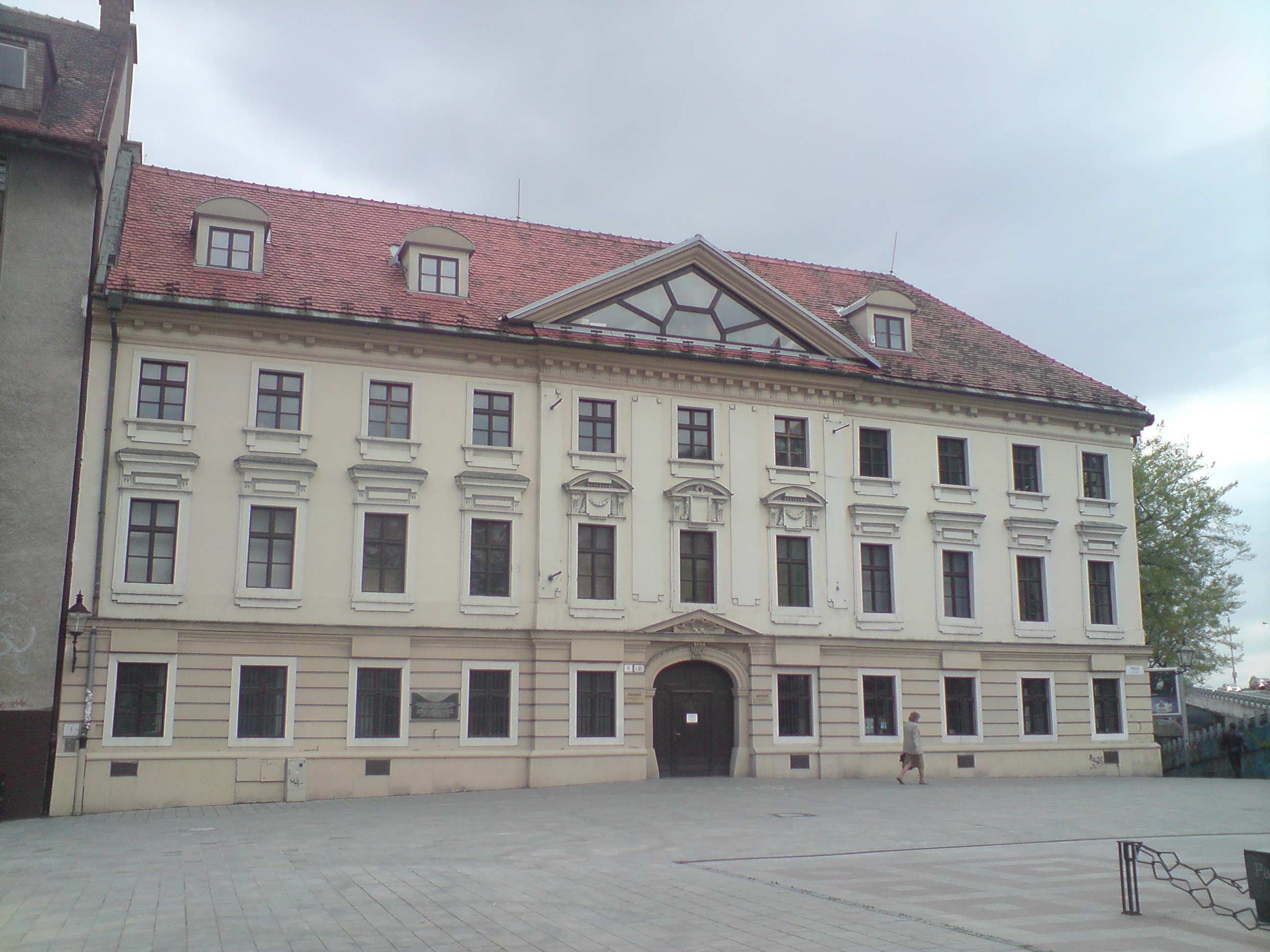
The headquarters of BIBIANA – International House of Art for Children in Panská, Bratislava

The Biennial of Illustration Bratislava (BIB) is one of the oldest international honours for children's book illustrators. First granted in 1967 to Yasuo Segawa (Japan), it is one of the more prestigious children's book awards today, along with the Hans Christian Andersen Award. Artists are selected by an international jury, and their original artwork is exhibited in Bratislava, Slovakia. From the very beginning BIB has been held under the auspices of UNESCO and the International Board on Books for Young People (IBBY), and with the support of the Ministry of Culture, Slovakia. There are twelve awards, including a grand prize for unique and outstanding illustration:

- 1 Grand Prix
- 5 Golden Apples
- 5 Plaques
- 1 Honorary Mention Certificate to Publisher

In 1987 BIBIANA – International House of Art for Children was founded as a "cultural institution with international activity". BIBIANA now also organizes Biennial of Animation Bratislava (BAB).

== List of Grand Prix winners ==
Winning illustrations can be seen at BIBIANA web site.

Year	Winner	Country
1967	Yasuo Segawa	Japan
1969	Eva Bednářová	Czechoslovakia
1971	Andrzej Strumiłło	Poland
1973	Lieselotte Schwarz	Germany
1975	Nikolaj Popov	Soviet Union
1977	Ulf Löfgren	Sweden
1979	Klaus Ensikat	GDR
1981	Roald Als	Denmark
1983	Dušan Kállay	Czechoslovakia
1985	Frédéric Clément	France
1987	Hannu Taina	Finland
1989	Marian Murawski	Poland
1991	Stasys Eidrigevicius	Poland
1993	Lorenzo Mattotti	Italy
1995	John Rowe	UK
1997	Martin Jarrie	France
1999	Etsuko Nakatuji	Japan
2001	Eric Battut	France
2003	Iku Dekune	Japan
2005	Ali Reza Goldouzian	Iran
2007	Einar Turkowski	Germany
2009	Josep Antoni Tássies Penella	Spain
2011	Eunyoung Cho	South Korea
2013	Evelyne Laube, Nina Wehrle	Switzerland
2015	Laura Carlin	UK
2017	Ludwig Volbeda	Netherlands
2019	Hassan Moosavi	Iran
2021	Elena Odriozola	Spain

== List of Golden Apple Prix winners ==
Year	Winner	Country
1981	Boris Diodorov	Soviet Union
2003	Isol Misenta	Argentina
2003	Michael Dudok De Wit	Netherlands
2003	Victoria Fomina	Russia
2003	Armin Greder	Switzerland
2003	Chiara Carrer	Italy
2005	Lilian Broegger	Denmark
2005	Byoung – Ho Han	South Korea
2005	Luboslav Palo	Slovakia
2005	Pawel Pawlak	Poland
2005	Sara	France
2009	Pavel Tatarnikov	Belarus
2009	František Skála	Czech Republic
2009	Piet Grobler	South Africa
2009	Martina Matlovicova-Kralova	Slovakia
2009	Boris Zabirochin	Russia
2013	Yu Rong	China
2013	Nobuhiko Haijima	Japan
2013	Chiki Kikuchi	Japan
2013	In-Kyung Noh	South Korea
2013	Irma Bastida Herrera	Mexico
2015	Elena Odriozola	Spain
2015	Mirocomachiko	Japan
2015	Javier Zabala	Spain
2015	Ronald Curchod	Switzerland
2015	Bingchun Huang (Mi He)	China
2017	Daniela Olejníková	Slovakia
2017	Narges Mohammadi	Iran
2017	Ji-Min Kim	South Korea
2017	Anna Desnickaja	Russia
2017	Maki Arai	Japan
2019	Chengliang Zhu	China
2019	Soojung Myung	South Korea
2019	Wen Dee Tan	Malaysia
2019	Anton Lomaev	Russia
2019	Jānis Blanks	Latvia
2021	Myung Ae Lee	South Korea
2021	Amanda Mijangos, Armando Fonseca, Juan Palomino	Mexico
2021	Sylvie Bello	France
2021	Anna Kendel, Varvara Kendel	Russia
2021	Chao Zhang	China
