= Ostrum Asset Management =

French asset management company

- Company type: Public limited company
- Industry: Financial services
- Predecessor: Natixis Asset Management
- Founded: 2007; 19 years ago
- Headquarters: Paris, France
- Area served: Europe, Asia, North America
- Key people: Oliver Houix (CEO), Ibrahima Ikobar (deputy CEO CIO),
- Products: Asset Management
- Total assets: €416 Billion (31 December 2024)
- Number of employees: 400 (2022)
- Subsidiaries: Ostrum Asset Management U.S., Ostrum Asset Management Asia Limited, Natixis Asset Management Finance
- Website: www.ostrum.com

Ostrum Asset Management (previously Natixis Asset Management), is a French asset management company that was founded in 2007. The company is part of French banking group BPCE. Ostrum Asset Management is an affiliate of Natixis Investment Managers (previously Natixis Global Asset Management), majority owned by BPCE.

As of June 30, 2024, Ostrum Asset Management held €396 billion ($400 billion) in assets and was employing over 700 people.

== History ==
=== Foundation, 1985–2006 ===
The company originated in 1985 with the creation of Nord Sud Développement, one of the early so-called solidarity funds. It was later renamed Natixis Impact Nord Sud Développement. In 2001, CDC Asset Management became CDC IXIS Asset Management. Three years later, in 2004, CDC IXIS Asset Management was renamed IXIS Asset Management, under the full ownership of IXIS Asset Management Group.

In 2006, Natixis was created through the alignment of activities between Groupe Caisse d’Epargne and Groupe Banque Populaire.

=== Natixis Asset Management 2007-2017 ===
In 2013, the company launched the Natixis Global Risk Parity Fund, a global allocation fund with a balanced risk approach. A year later it launched the Natixis Short Term Global High Income Fund. In 2016, it launched Real Assets Private Debt management in three sectors: real estate, infrastructure and aircraft.

In 2017 the enforcement committee of the French financial regulatory agency, Autorité des Marchés Financier (AMF), fined Natixis Asset Management for overcharging investors with its formula funds. The ruling was handed down on 25 July 2017 and the company was fined €35 million.

=== Ostrum 2018-onwards ===
In 2018, Natixis Asset Management was renamed Ostrum Asset Management. Natixis Asset Management U.S. and Natixis Asset Management Asia were also renamed Ostrum Asset Management U.S. and Ostrum Asset Management Asia Limited by June 2018.

On 21 January 2025, BPCE (Ostrum Assets Management's parent company) and Italian insurer Generali announced that they have signed a non-binding memorandum of understanding to create a joint venture in order combine their asset management operations. The 50-50 owned joint venture would include all of BPCE's affiliated asset management firms (including Natixis Investment Managers, and therefore Ostrum Assets Management) and have around €1.9tn of assets under management. On 11 December 2025, Generali and BPCE announced the termination of the negotiations aiming at the creation of a joint venture between their asset management operations.

== Operations ==
Ostrum Assets Management has operations in Europe, Asia and in the United States. Natixis Asset Management Asia manages Asian assets. Ostrum Assets Management's provides services to institutions, individuals and distributors.
