= François Pérol =

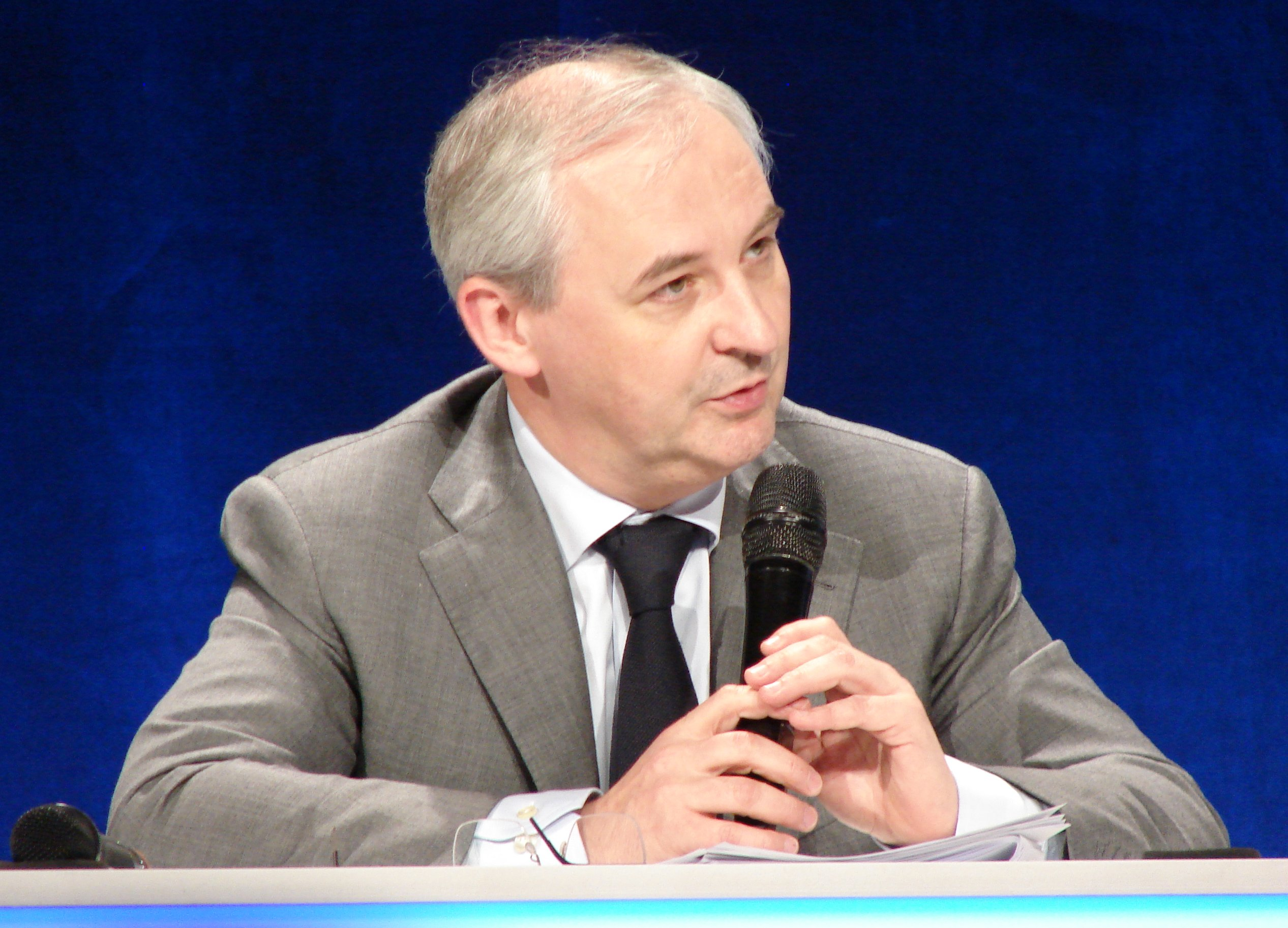
- Pérol in 2013
- Born: 6 November 1963 (age 62); Le Creusot, France
- Education: HEC Paris; Sciences Po, ÉNA
- Occupation: CEO Groupe BPCE

François Pérol (born 6 November 1963) is a French banker and high-ranking official and is the current chairman of Natixis.

== Education ==
Pérol graduated from HEC Paris in 1985, Sciences Po, and the École nationale d'administration (ENA), where he ranked first in his class.

== Career ==
In 1994, he was appointed rapporteur then Secretary General of the Interministerial Committee for Industrial Restructuring (Ciri). Then he was Head of the office of financial markets to the Treasury from 1996 to 1999 and secretary general of the Club de Paris. In 2001, he was promoted as Deputy Director of finance and business development of the French Treasury.

In 2002, he became director of Francis Mer's staff and Nicolas Sarkozy, the Ministry of Economy, Finance and Industry at that time. He was in charge of the rescue of Alcatel, Bull, France Telecom (playing a role in the denial to the latter, against the advice of the Treasury, an increase of capital from the state and the departure of its CEO, Michel Bon) and the recapitalization of Alstom, negotiated with the European Commission. It also follows the birth of Sanofi-Aventis, the French Government is negotiating with the U.S. court for the conclusion of the case Executive Life2, and organizes the sale of Ixis by the Caisse des dépôts et consignations to the Caisses d'Epargne.

Following his collaboration with Nicolas Sarkozy at the ministry of Economy, he was enrolled at the UMP in 2004. From 2005 to 2007, he was managing partner of Rothschild Bank. As such, he advises Philippe Dupont, CEO of Banque Populaire in the creation of Natixis.

In May 2007, he was appointed deputy secretary general of the Presidency of the French Republic, where he became the "great architect of the economic program of Nicolas Sarkozy". In the Clearstream affair he was accused by businessman Imad Lahoud for having organized a meeting with Nicolas Sarkozy, which he denies.

In 2009, he became CEO of Groupe BPCE, and in November 2012, he was re-elected for a further 4 years as chairman of the management board.

He has also been president of the French Banking Federation since 1 September 2009.
