= Nicolas Mérindol =

French business executive

- Born: Cambrai in the Nord Department, France
- Education: Institut supérieur de gestion de Paris
- Occupations: Business executive, banker
- Known for: Former CEO of the Groupe Caisse d'Épargne

Nicolas Mérindol is a French Business executive who was the former CEO of the Groupe Caisse d'Épargne. Since July 2012 he has been the Chairman and Partner of Amilton, a financial services group.

He was formerly the Vice-Chairman for France of Banca Leonardo, a position he took up in January 2010. He has also served as the Chairman of Constructa Asset Management’s Board of Directors since December 2012.

== Education ==
Nicolas Mérindol obtained a degree from the Institut supérieur de gestion de Paris (ISG) and is a qualified chartered accountant.

== Career ==
Nicolas Mérindol’s career began in Renault's Financial Department, first in France and then in Argentina from 1984 to 1987. He went on to join the Caisse des dépôts et consignations (CDC) where he was responsible for regional credit institutions (SOREFIs). He then joined Groupe Caisse d'épargne in 1988.

After several years on the ground in various managerial positions at the Caisse d'Épargne in Picardie, he became the CFO in 1996, then the CEO of Groupe Caisse d’Épargne in September 2006.

As CEO of Groupe Caisse d’Épargne, Nicolas Mérindol held a number of board positions in the banking, insurance, and services industries:

- Chairman of the Board of Crédit foncier de France
- Chairman of the Supervisory Board of Banque Palatine
- Chairman of the Supervisory Board of Gestrim
- Chairman of the Supervisory Board of La Compagnie 1818 Banquiers Privés
- Chairman of GCE Capital (Venture Capital)
- Member of the Board of Directors of CNP Assurances
- Member of the Supervisory Board of Natixis (Investment Bank)
- Member of the Board of Directors of Nexity (Real Estate)
- Member of the Board of Coface(Insurance)

In 2007 he launched a sustainable development programme at Groupe Caisse d'Epargne called “Bénéfices Futurs”. This was a pioneering programme for a large banking group, the objective of which was to rate all products according to three criteria: safety, responsibility, and climate. He also worked on social issues alongside the National Federation of Caisses D’Épargne, developing measures to fight against banking exclusion through the “Parcours Confiance” programme. During this time period he also held investment banking positions in France and abroad, including:

- Chairman of the Supervisory Board of Fonds de Garantie des Déposants
- President of the European Banking Committee (EBIC)
- Director of La Banca Carige (Italy)

In October 2008, during the 2008 financial crisis, following a trading loss of €751 million by a trader, he resigned from his position as Chief Executive Officer of Groupe Caisse d'Épargne, at the same time as the Chairman of the Management Board Charles Milhaud. After leaving Groupe Caisse d’Epargne, he created his own consulting firm and then joined Banca Leonardo in January 2010 as Vice-Chairman for the Group’s French subsidiaries.

In July 2012 he launched "Amilton", an independent banking services group that he directs through Amilton Partenaires, where he is a strategic shareholder. Amilton works in the fields of Asset Management, Corporate Finance Consulting, and Specialised Financial Services.

Nicolas Mérindol is also a member of the Board of Directors of several other companies.

== Other positions ==
As part of his commitment to social issues, Nicolas Mérindol has been active in a number of organisations

- Member of the Social Cohesion Fund Committee
- Member of the National Sustainable Development Committee
- Member of the Board of Directors of Vigeo
- Professor of Financial Mathematics and Finance at ESCAE (Amiens School of Management)

In 2009, he became Chairman of the Board of Directors of AMREF Flying Doctors, and was later elected to its International Board based in Kenya. AMREF is the most important African humanitarian NGO focused on health and medical research.

In 2012 he was elected to the board of Hôpital Foch. Nicolas Mérindol is also a commercial court judge, having been elected in 2010 and 2012 to the Bobigny Commercial Court.

== Distinctions ==
Nicolas Mérindol is a recipient of the Moroccan Order of Ouissam Alaouite.
