= Fidor Bank =

German online bank

Coordinates: 48.1496°N 11.5565°E

- Company type: Private company
- Industry: Financial services
- Founded: 2009
- Defunct: 2023
- Fate: Closed down by parent
- Headquarters: Munich, Germany
- Area served: Germany, United Kingdom
- Key people: Boris Joseph (CEO), Pascal Cirelli (CRO), Julien Martinez (COO), Sebastian Birkett (CFO)
- Products: Online banking, banking services
- Owner: Groupe BPCE
- Number of employees: 347 (2018)
- Website: www.fidor.de

Fidor Bank was a German direct bank that operated from 2009 until it ceased operations in July 2023.

== History ==
The bank was founded in 2009 in Munich, Germany.

In 2015, it made a market foray into the UK. In July 2016, it was announced that Fidor Bank was being acquired by France's Groupe BPCE for €100m. As of September 2016, Fidor Bank continued to operate under its own branding.

On 1 July 2019 Fidor Bank announced that it would suspend its services in the UK on 15 September 2019 owing to uncertainties about the UK market.

In February 2023, Fidor Bank informed its customers that their accounts would soon be closed. The company announced that it would cease operations in the same year.

== See also ==
- List of banks in Germany
