= Groupe Caisse d'Épargne =

Former French cooperative banking group

Groupe Caisse d'épargne
- Company type: Semi co-operative
- Industry: Financial services
- Founded: November 1818; 207 years ago
- Defunct: 31 July 2009
- Fate: Merged with Banque fédérale des banques populaires to become BPCE
- Headquarters: Paris, France
- Key people: François Pérol
- Products: Banking and insurance
- Number of employees: 52,000
- Subsidiaries: Natixis
- Website: caisse-epargne.fr

Groupe Caisse d'Épargne (French pronunciation: [ɡʁup kɛs depaʁɲ], lit. 'Savings Bank Group') was a group of French savings banks that were converted into cooperative banks by legislation enacted in 1999. Its roots went back to the founding in 1818 of the Caisse d'Épargne et de Prévoyance de Paris, initiated by Benjamin Delessert and the Duke of La Rochefoucauld-Liancourt.

Caisse d'Épargne was an active financial services group engaged in retail and private banking, maintaining a network of approximately 4,700 branches across the country. The group also held a significant interest in the publicly traded investment bank Natixis. In 2009, Caisse d'Épargne merged with Groupe Banque Populaire to establish Groupe BPCE. A dedicated retail banking network currently operates under the Caisse d'Épargne brand name within the larger BPCE structure.

== History ==
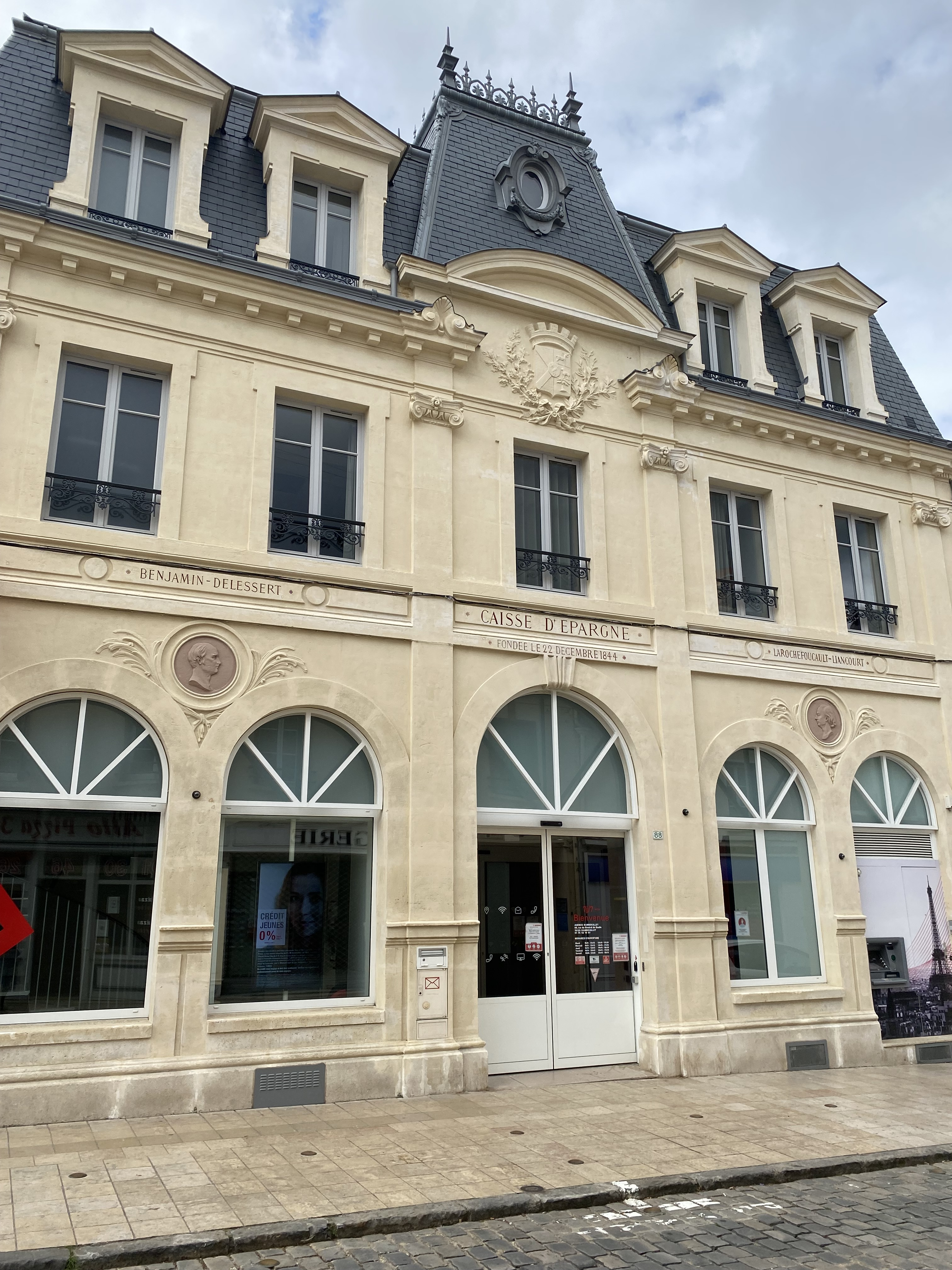
Caisse d'Epargne building in Rambouillet, with tribute to the group's two main co-founders, Delessert and La Rochefoucauld-Liancourt

The first French savings bank, or French: Caisse d'Épargne, was established in Paris in 1818 by a group of financiers, social reformers and philanthropists. Its founders included Benjamin Delessert, Jean-Conrad Hottinguer, Joseph Marie de Gérando, Jacques Laffitte, François Alexandre Frédéric, duc de La Rochefoucauld-Liancourt, James Mayer de Rothschild and Vital Roux. Delessert and La Rochefoucauld-Liancourt were generally regarded as the main promoters of the initiative. In the following years, Caisses d'Épargne were created in many French towns and cities on a decentralized basis, through the initiative of prefects, municipal councils, mounts of piety—traditional lending institutions overseen by the Catholic Church—and local Catholic or Protestant elites. Most of them were founded in the northern half of France and served primarily urban, rather than rural, populations. As in other European countries, their original aim of meeting the lifelong financial needs of lower-income groups was only partly achieved; their client base also included many members of the emerging and affluent middle classes, including women and children, with marked regional differences.

The Caisses d'Épargne were not full-service banks, as they were not allowed to lend. Under successive national savings bank laws beginning in 1829, their legal status was that of private-sector institutions of a distinctive kind: they were neither associations nor commercial companies, and were governed by boards of co-opted volunteers. The deposits they collected were invested in government bonds. The Caisse des Dépôts et Consignations, a financial arm of the French state, became involved in the management of collected savings from 1837, and fully centralized that function from 1895.

By 1881, France had 542 local Caisses d'Épargne. That year, the French government decided to create the Caisse Nationale d'Épargne (CNE), the country's first postal savings system, which competed with the existing savings banks by using the national post office network. From that point, the pre-existing Caisses d'Épargne were described as "ordinary" or "private" savings banks, in French French: Caisses ordinaires or caisses privées, to distinguish them from the state-owned CNE.

In 1983, new legislation created a central financial body, the Centre national des caisses d'épargne et de prévoyance (CENCEP). In 1992, CENCEP was replaced by the Caisse Nationale des Caisses d'Épargne (CNCE), which, unlike CENCEP, held a banking licence. A further legislative change in 1999 transformed the savings banks into cooperatives. These steps prepared the gradual conversion of the decentralized savings-bank network into a more integrated universal banking group during the following decade.

In July 1999, CNCE acquired majority ownership of Crédit Foncier de France. Also in 1999, France's Caisse des dépôts et consignations (CDC) created a commercial and investment banking subsidiary, CDC IXIS. In 2001, CNCE and CDC formed a joint venture, Eulia, to which CDC contributed CDC IXIS. CNCE took full control of Eulia in June 2004, and therefore also of CDC IXIS, which was renamed Ixis. Separately, between 2003 and 2008, CNCE acquired the French subsidiary of Sanpaolo IMI, including the former Banque Vernes and the French operations of the Banque Française Commerciale. It turned those activities into its private banking subsidiary, under the Banque Palatine name adopted in June 2005.

In 2006, Caisse d'Épargne and the fellow mutual group Groupe Banque Populaire agreed to merge their commercial and investment banking subsidiaries, Ixis and Natexis Banques Populaires. The resulting entity was named Natixis, a portmanteau of Natexis and Ixis. Natixis completed an initial public offering on 25 October 2006, after which CNCE and BFBP each held 35 percent of its equity capital, with the remainder in free float.

Natixis was subsequently affected by weak capital allocation and risk-management decisions during the 2008 financial crisis, including investments in Bernie Madoff's funds. Several senior executives resigned or were dismissed: Nicolas Mérindol and Charles Milhaud, respectively chief executive officer and chairman of CNCE, on 19 October 2008; Bernard Comolet and Bruno Mettling, respectively chairman of Natixis and chief executive officer of BFBP, on 6 March 2009; and Dominique Ferrero, chief executive officer of Natexis, on 29 April 2009.

In October 2008, Groupe Caisse d'Épargne announced plans to merge with Groupe Banque Populaire, in the context of consolidation in the banking sector. The press agency AFP linked the announcement directly to the 2008 financial crisis. The two groups nevertheless intended to retain their separate retail banking brands and branch networks. The combined entity was expected to hold €480 billion in deposits and to serve more than six million customers.

Groupe Caisse d'Épargne completed its merger with BFBP, the Banque fédérale des banques populaires, in July 2009. The merged group became BPCE, described at the time as France's second-largest bank.

== Operations ==
The group's most notable brand is the Caisse d'épargne network of mutual savings banks. Along with La Banque Postale and Crédit Mutuel, the bank shared the rights to offer the popular Livret A savings accounts, backed by the French government until January 1, 2009.

In addition, the group is also the owner of the mortgage bank Crédit Foncier, the corporate and private bank Banque Palatine and Financière Océor, a commercial, private asset management and specialist finance bank serving France's overseas departments.

In 2006 Groupe Caisse d'épargne merged its investment bank IXIS Corporate and Investment Bank with Groupe Banque Populaire's Natexis, creating Natixis, a publicly traded investment bank in which Caisse d'épargne and Groupe Banque Populaire currently hold an equal stake of 35.25%. Groupe Caisse d'épargne has also since merged its private wealth management bank La Compagnie 1818 into the Natixis group.

The group is listed in the 2007 ICA Global 300 list of mutuals and co-operatives, ranked 11th by 2005 turnover, making it the 2nd largest co-operative banking group in the world, after Crédit Agricole. It was the fourth French bank and the twenty-fifth bank in the world by total assets in 2008.

The company suffered a €751 million derivatives trading loss in October 2008, which it blamed partly on the high market volatility at the time. The group of employees responsible for making the unauthorised trades was dismissed.

== Sponsorship ==
The group was the title sponsor of a Spanish professional cycling team from 2006 to 2010, after which Movistar took over sponsorship.
The group is a sponsor of the French Handball Federation.

== Gallery ==
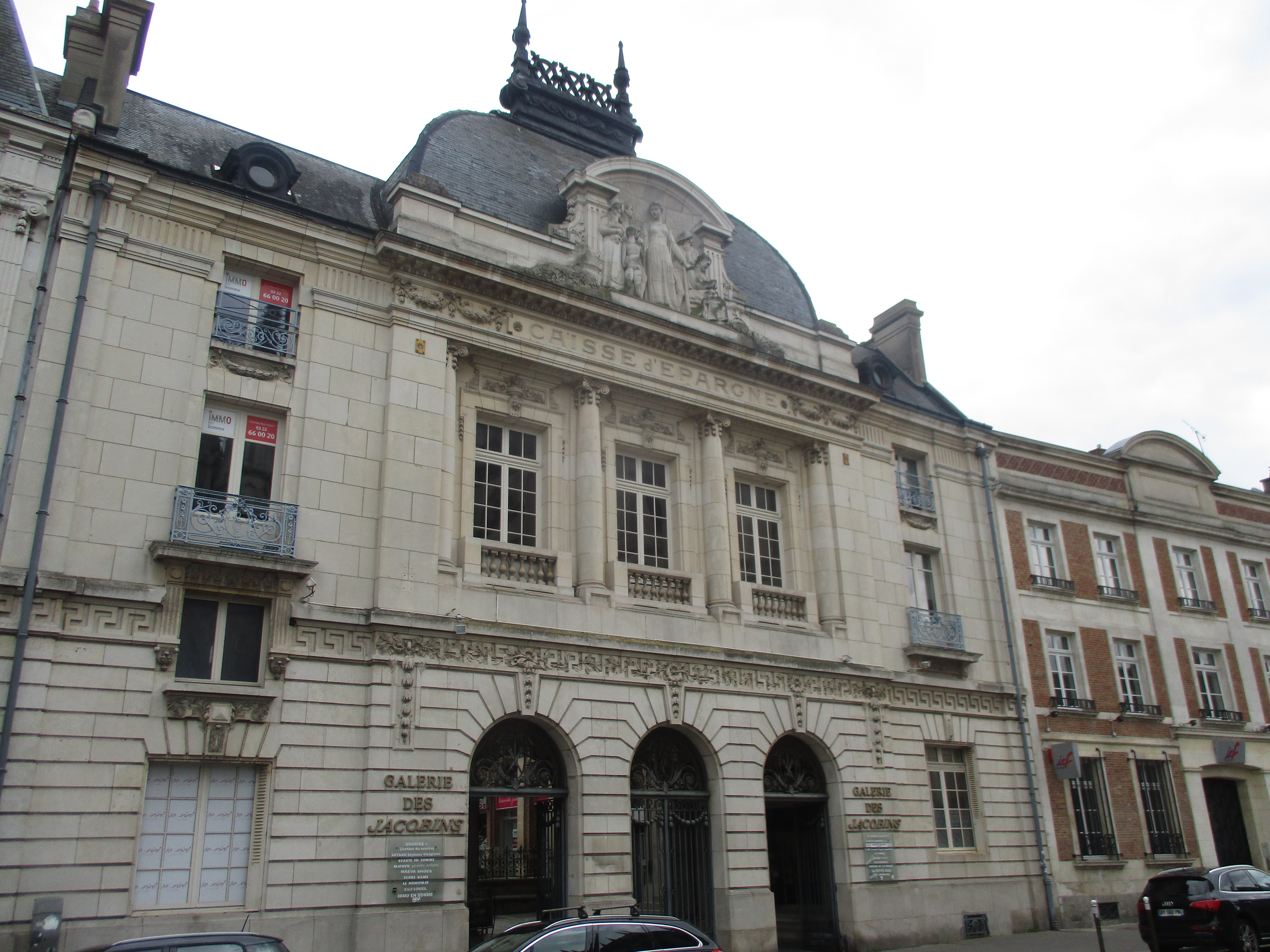
Caisse d'épargne, Amiens

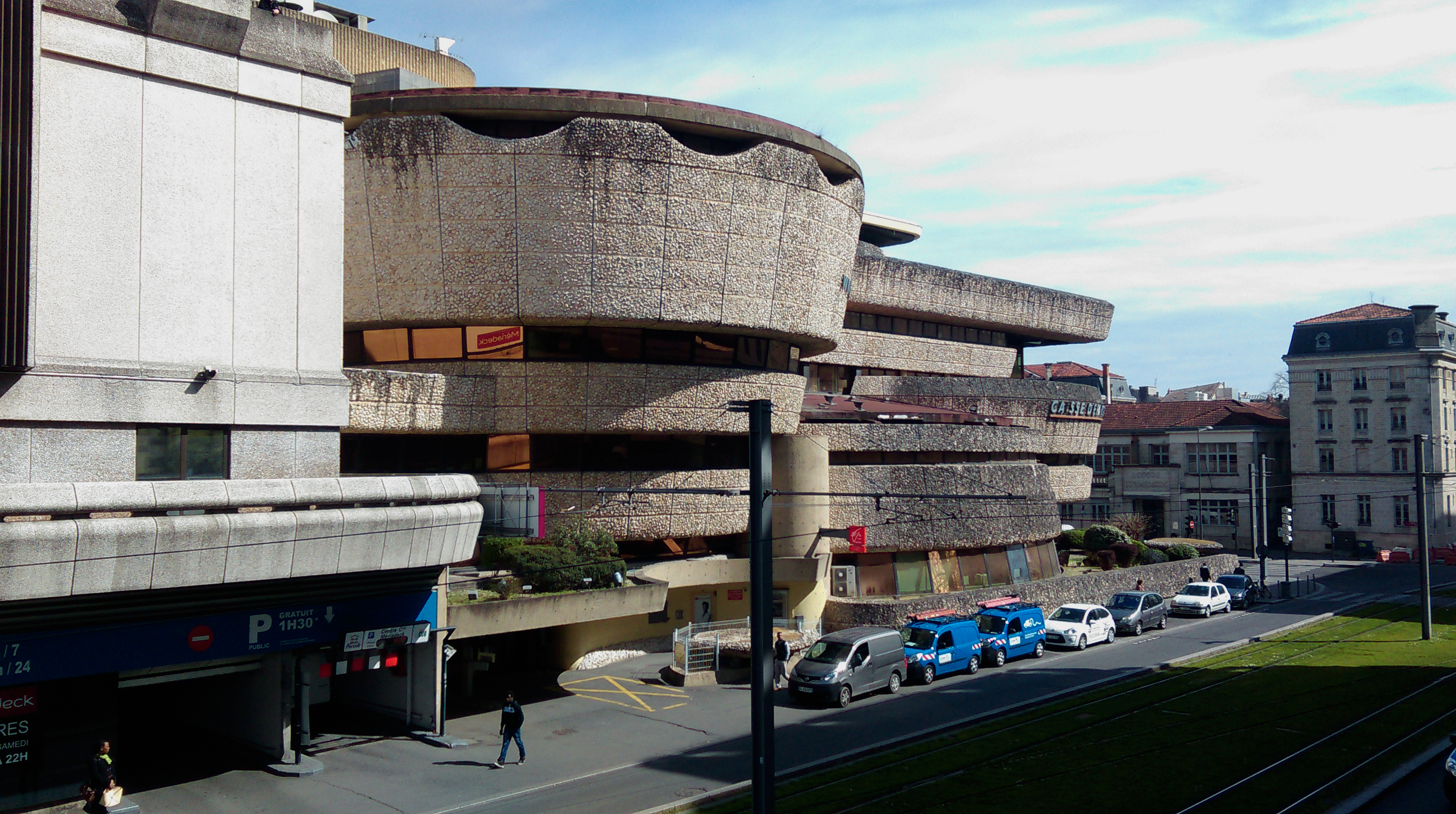
Caisse d'épargne, Bordeaux

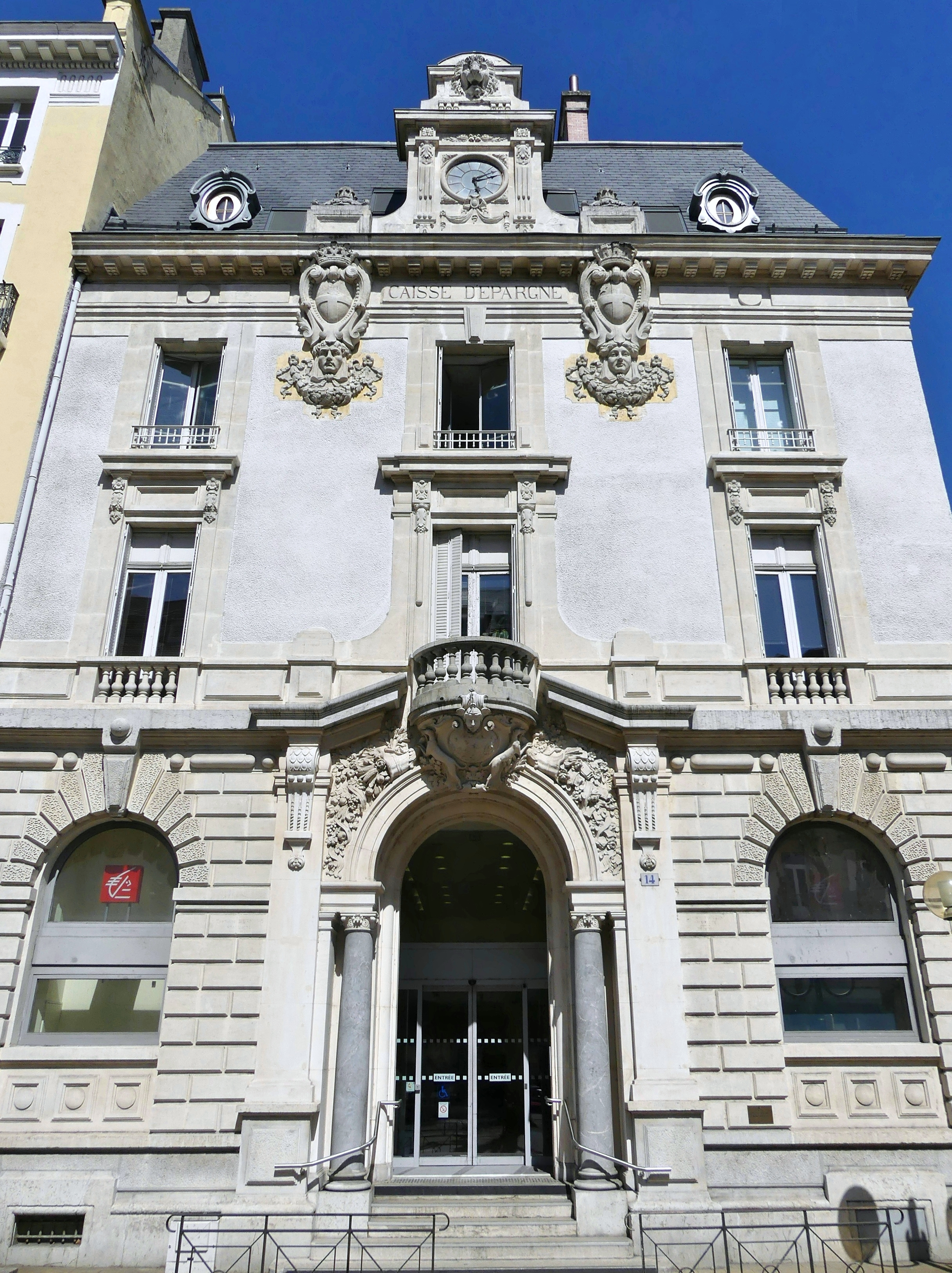
Caisse d'épargne, Chambéry

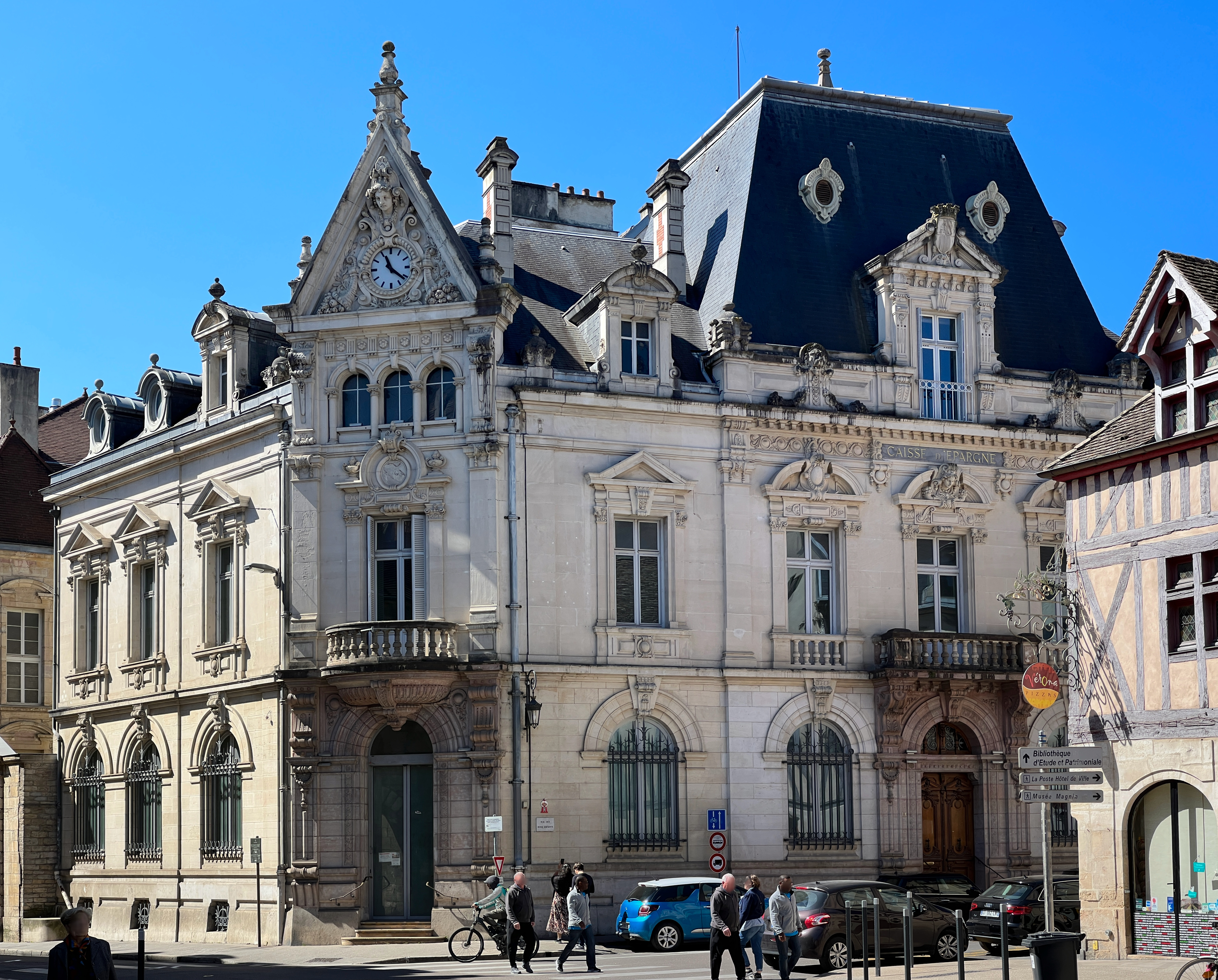
Caisse d'épargne, Dijon

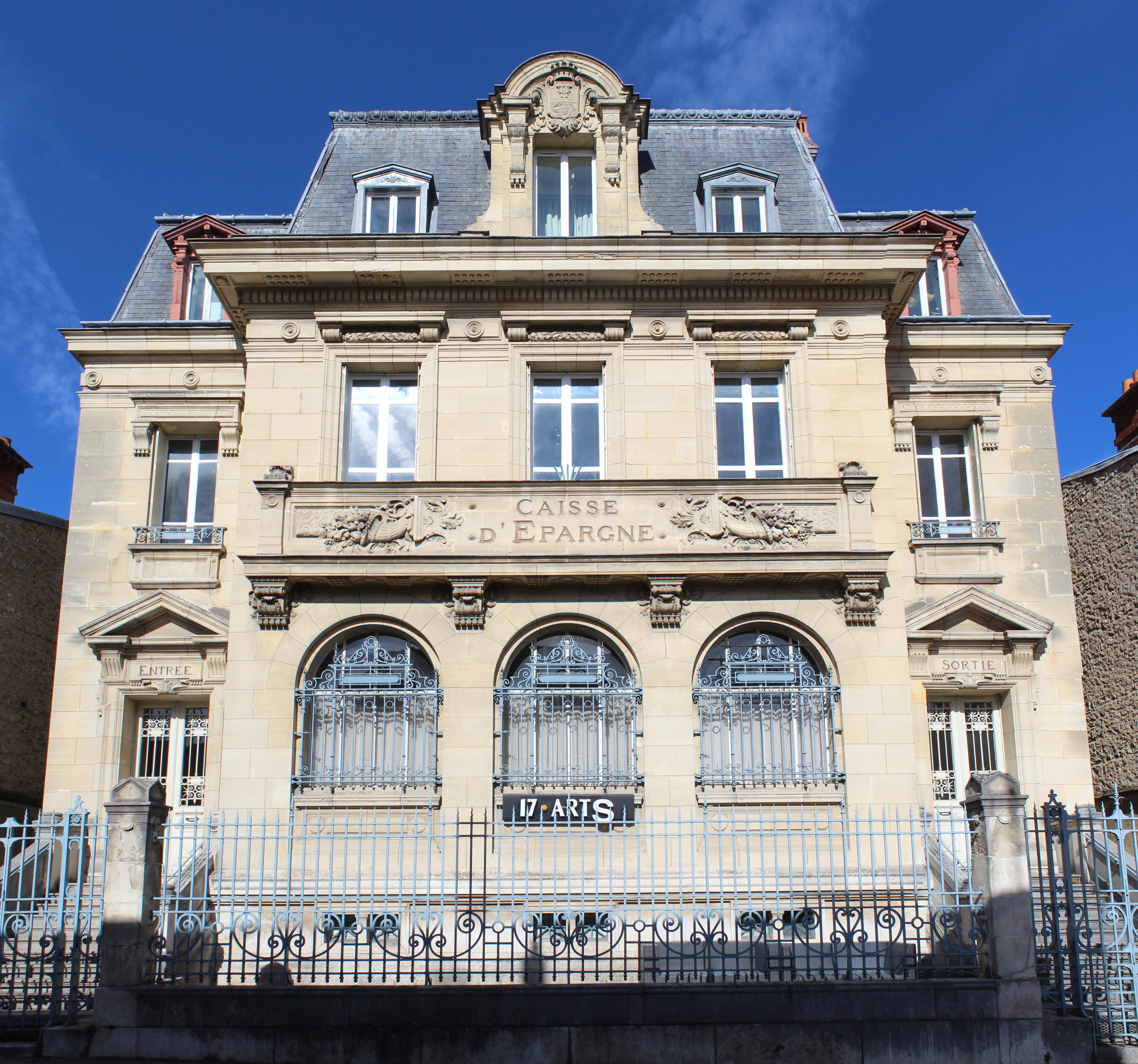
Caisse d'épargne, Fontainebleau

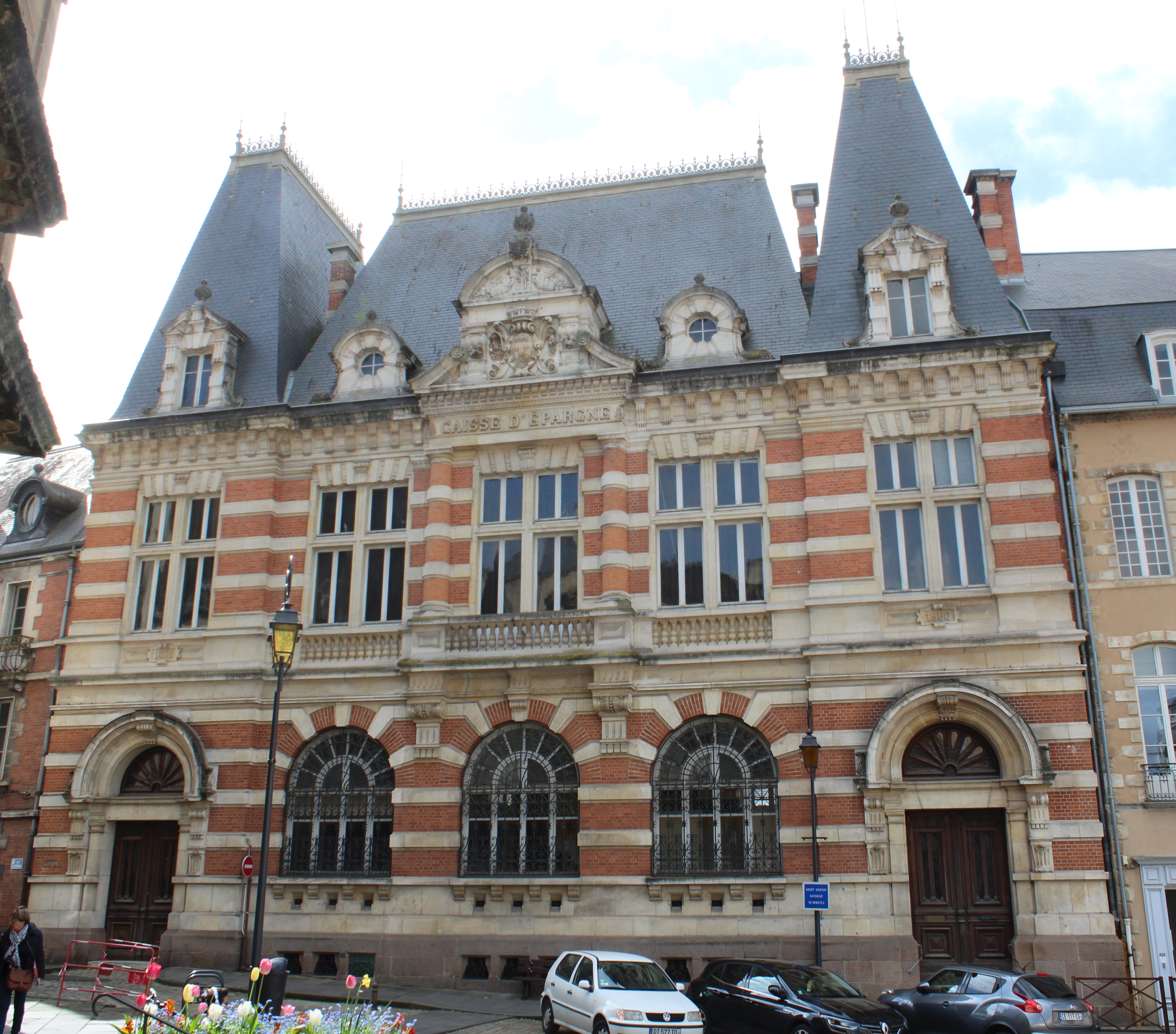
Caisse d'épargne, Moulins

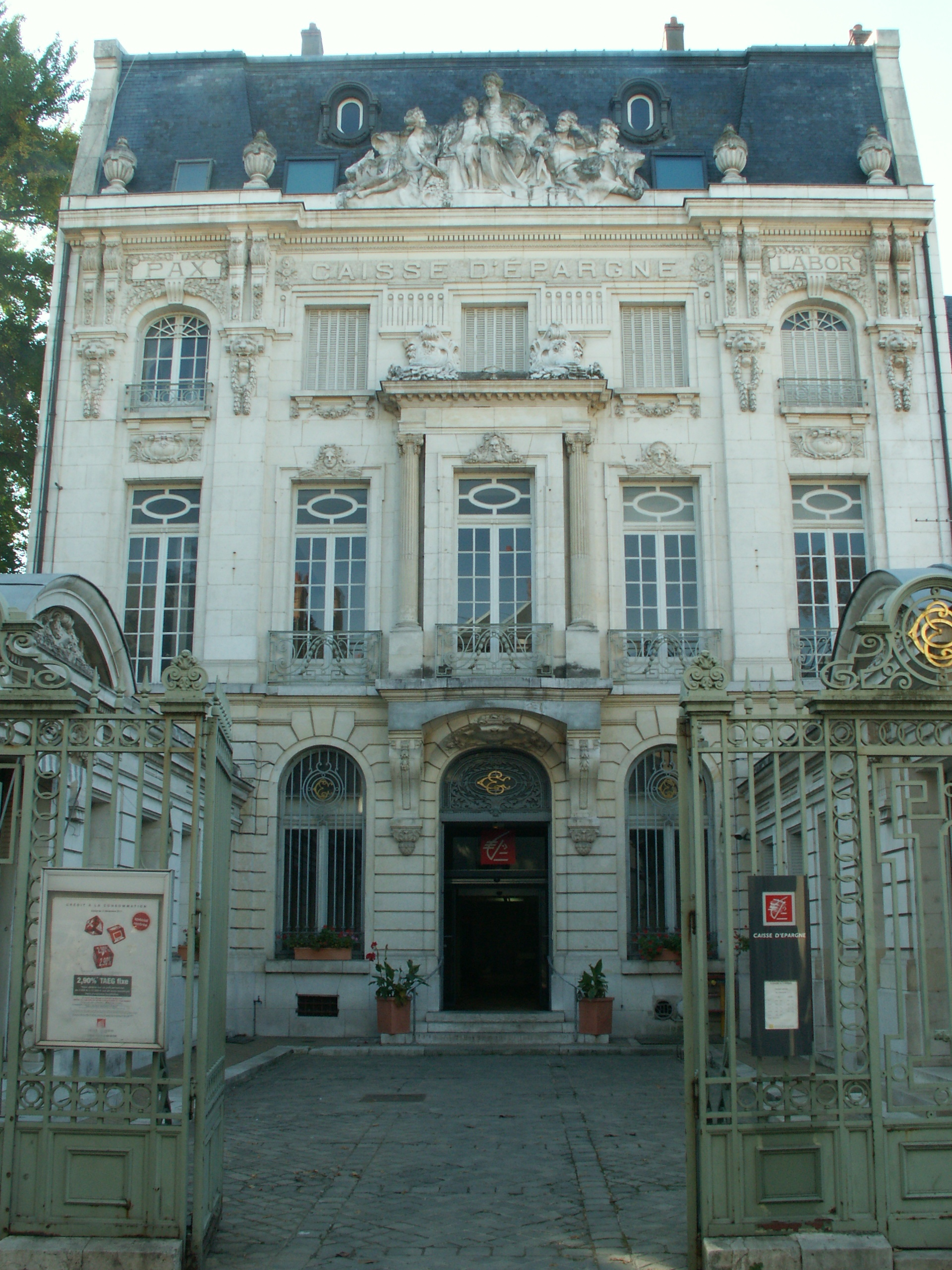
Caisse d'épargne, Orléans

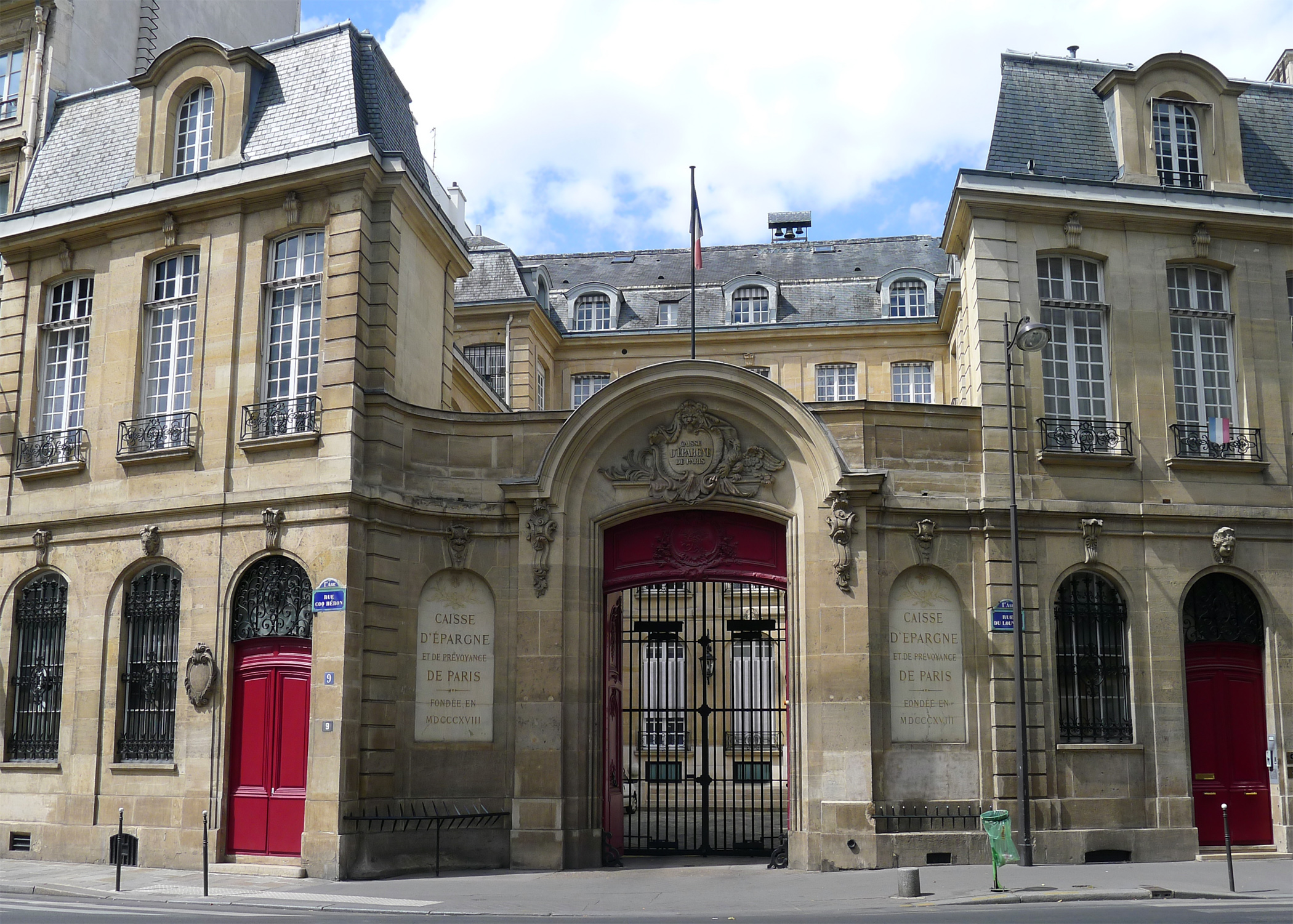
Hôtel Bullion, seat of the Caisse d'Épargne de Paris from 1844

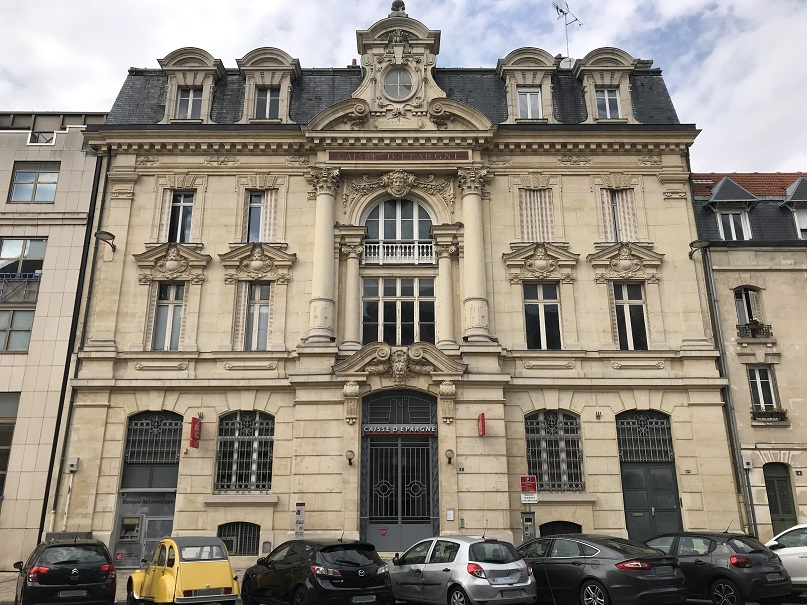
Caisse d'épargne, Reims

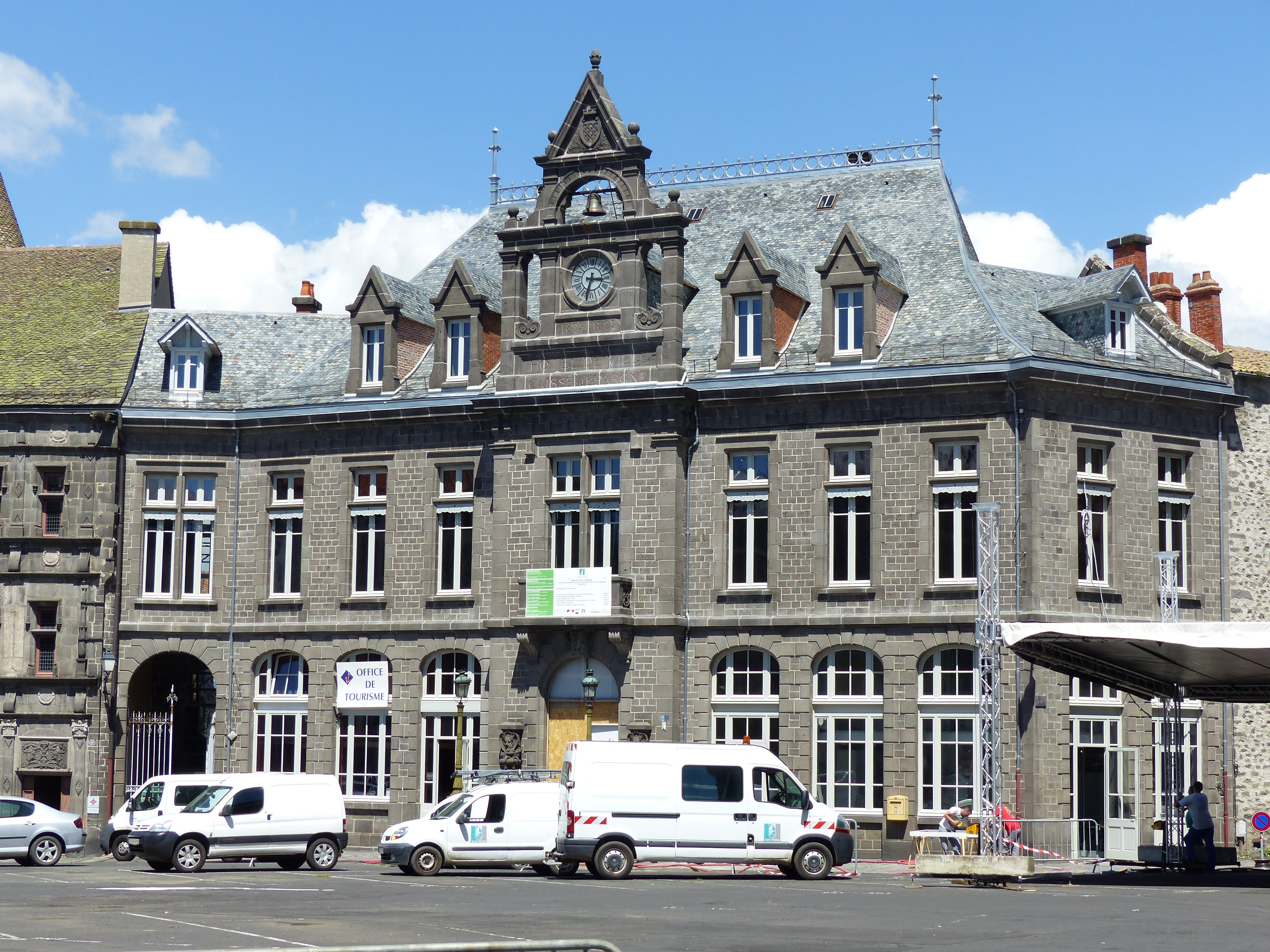
Caisse d'épargne, Saint-Flour

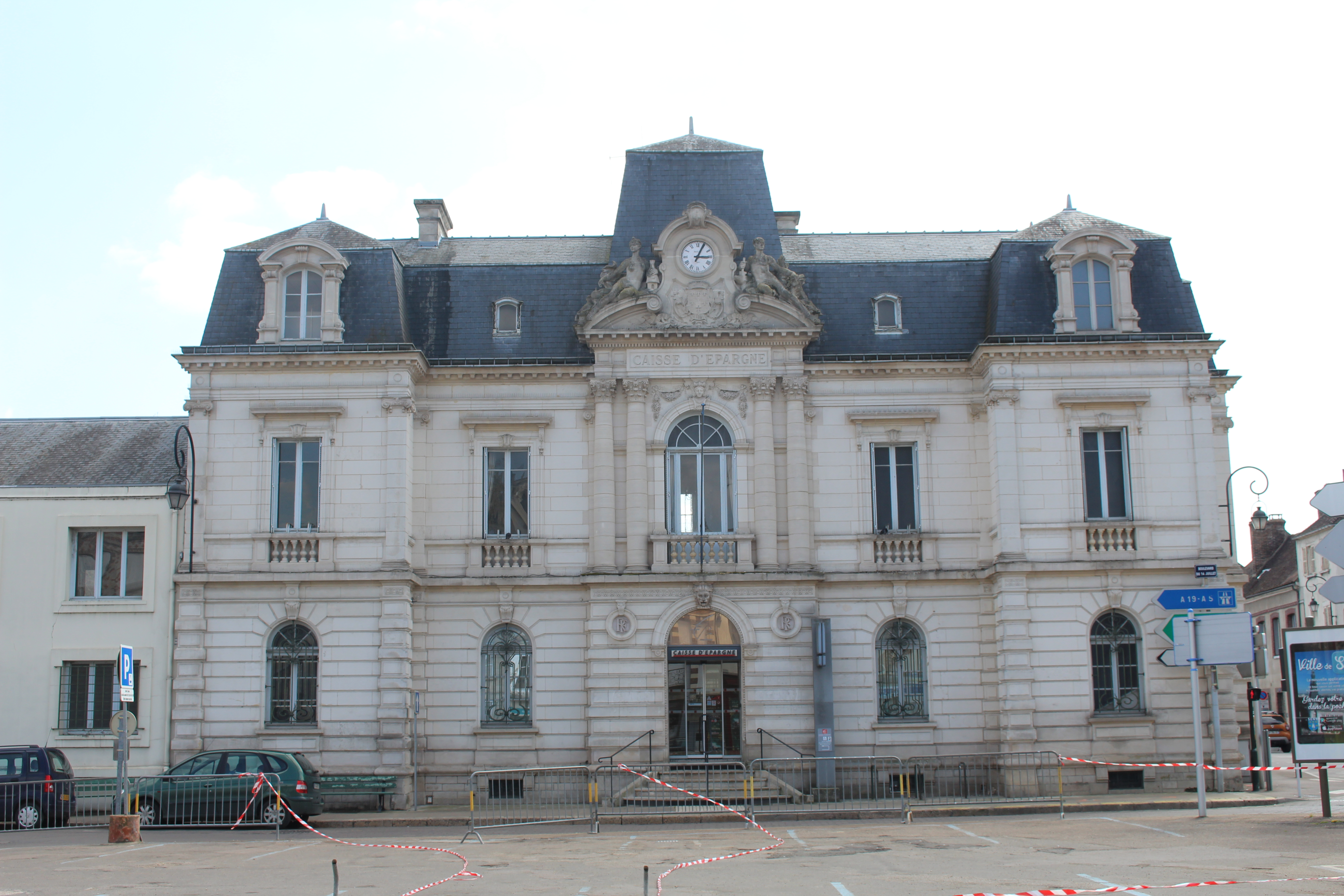
Caisse d'épargne, Sens

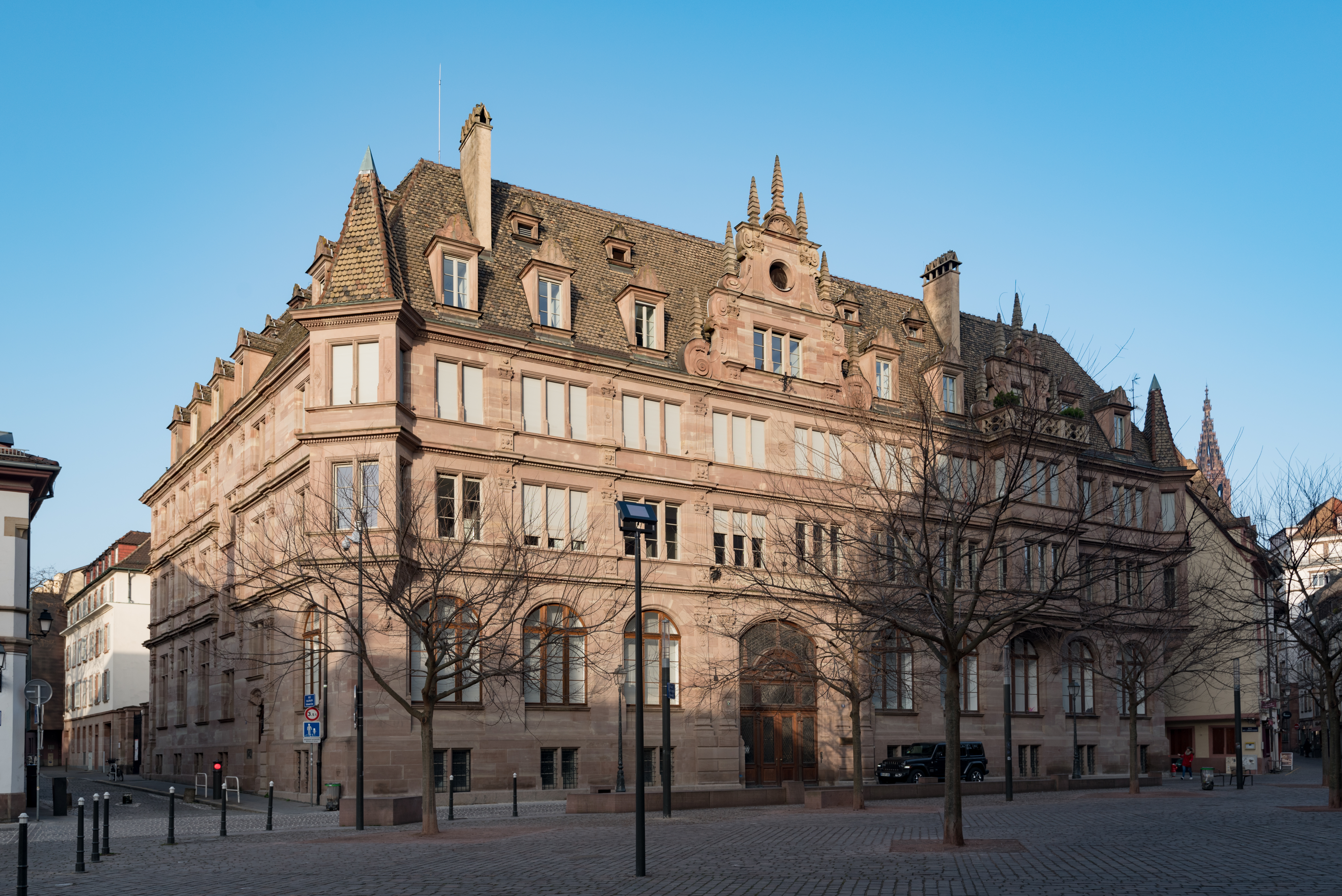
Caisse d'épargne, Strasbourg

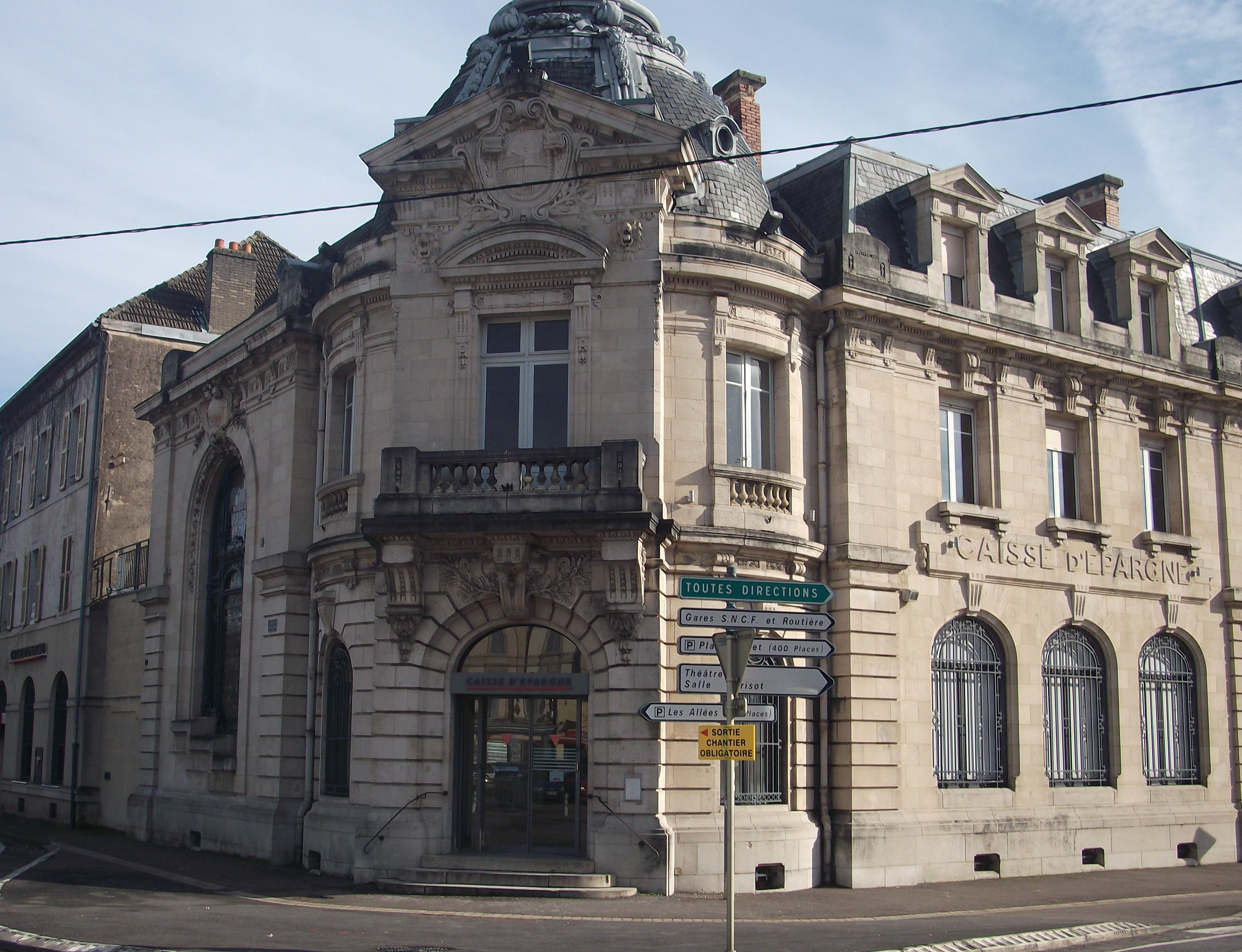
Caisse d'épargne, Vesoul

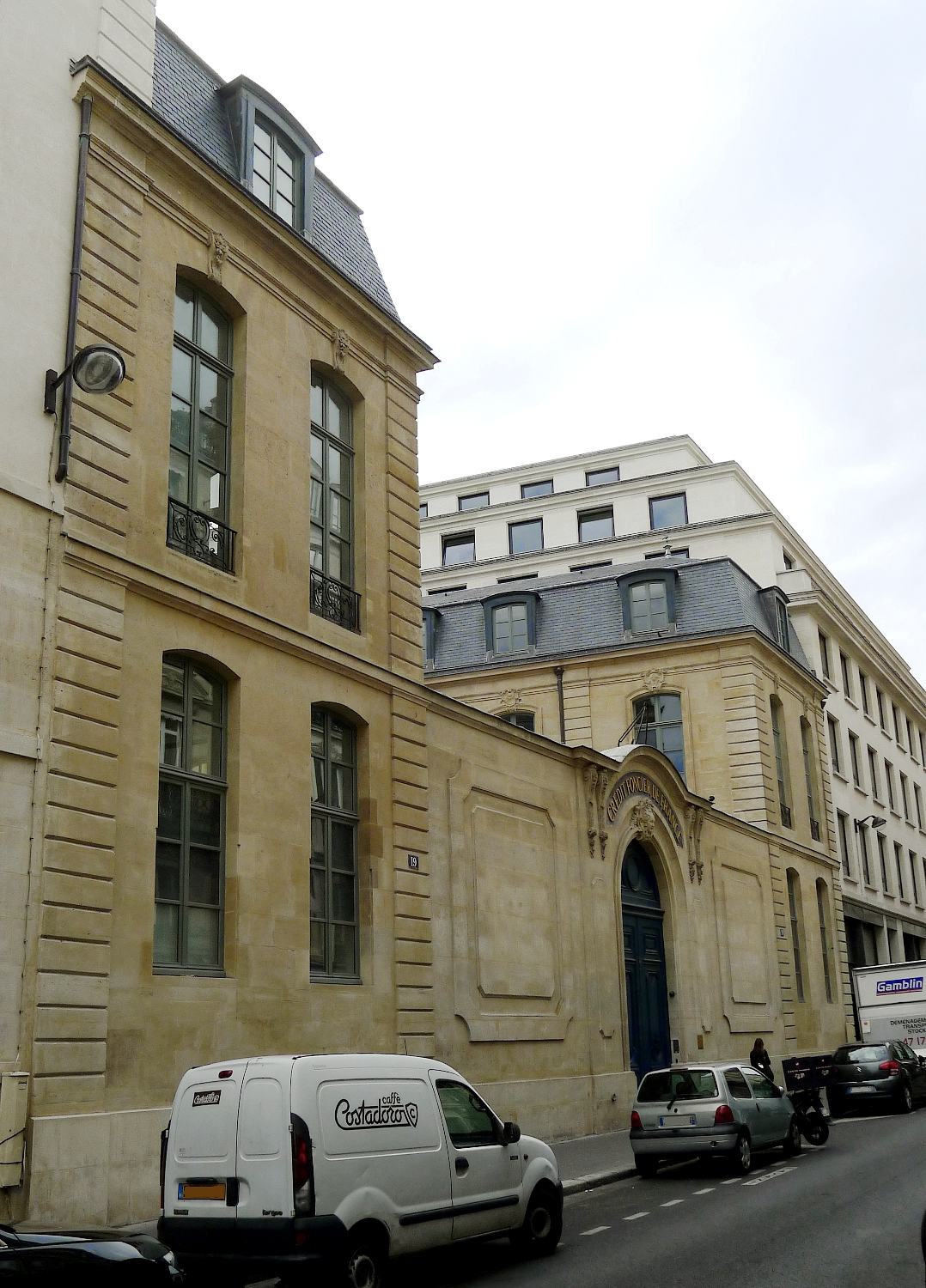
Former head office of Crédit Foncier at 19, rue des Capucines

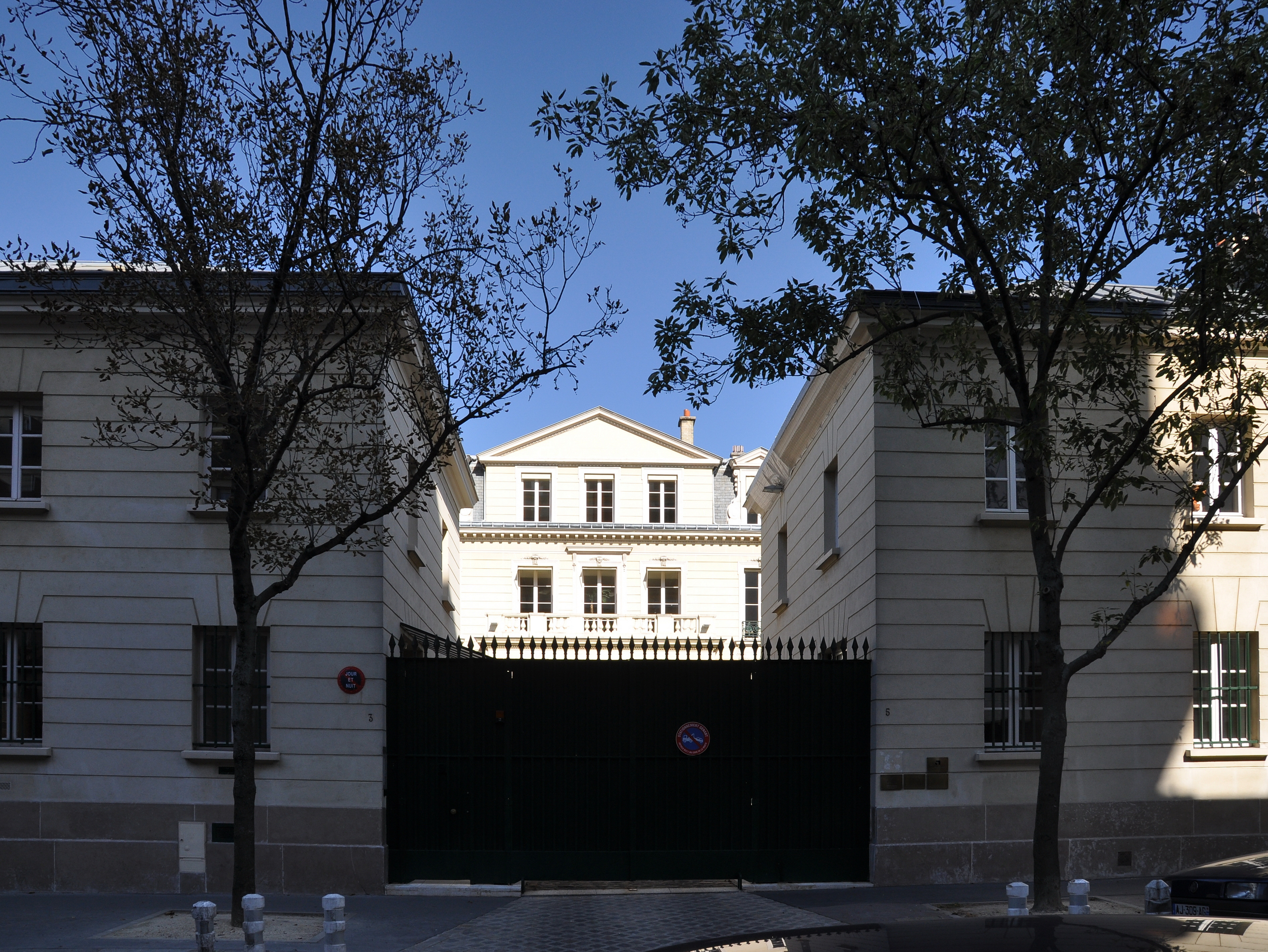
Hotel de Richepanse at 3–5, rue Masseran, former head office of CENCEP, CNCE and Eulia

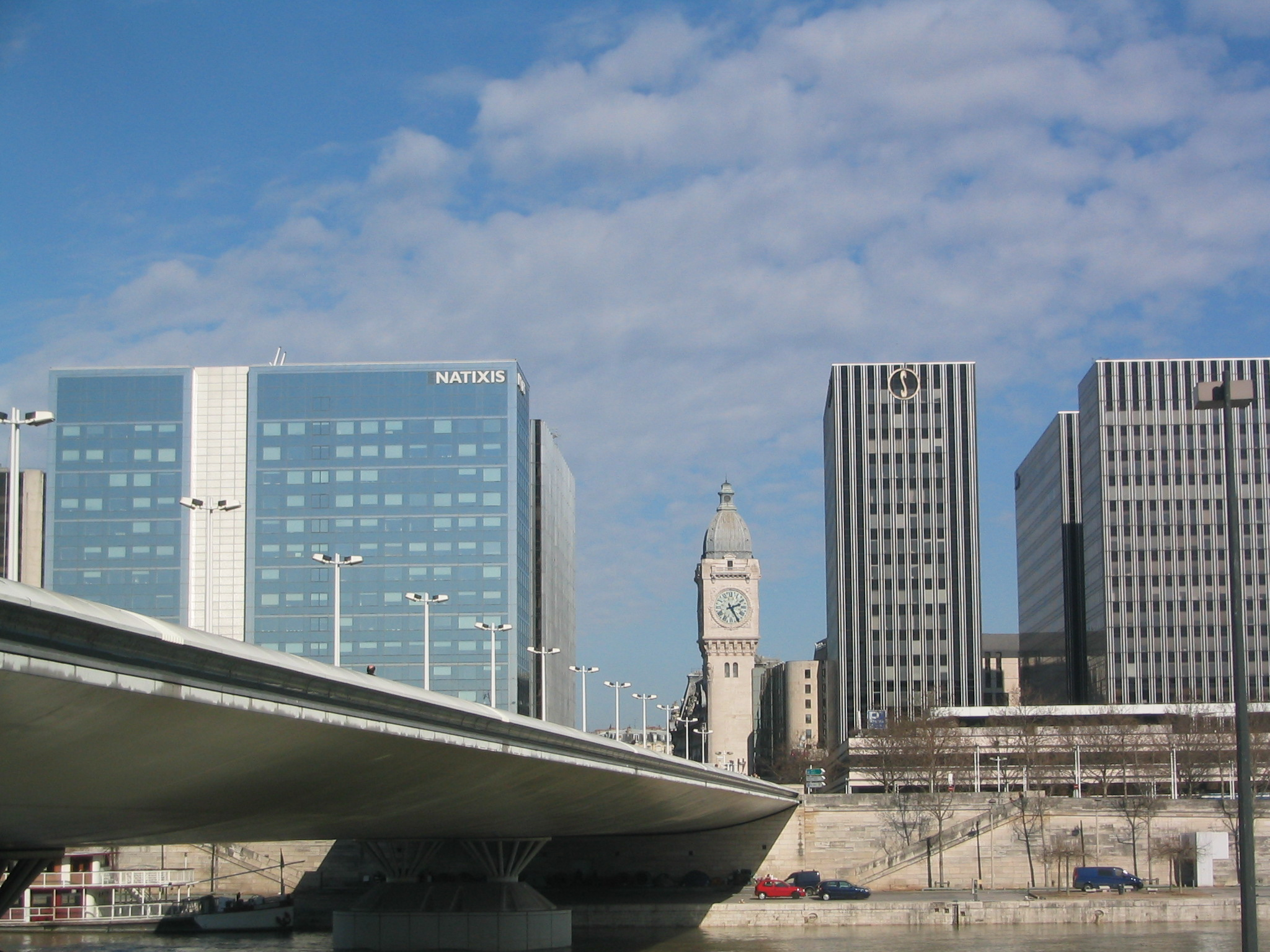
Head office of Natixis in 2007, near the Gare de Lyon

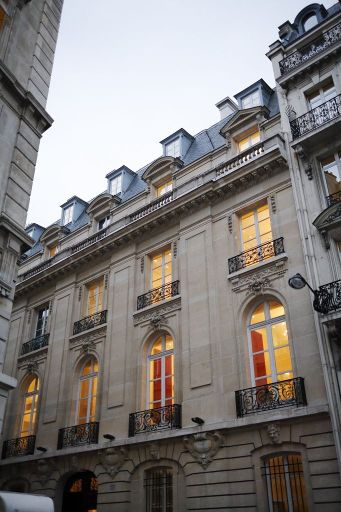
Former seat of Schneider et Cie at 42, rue d'Anjou in Paris, since December 2007 head office of Banque Palatine
