= Banque Palatine =

French Bank

Logo

Banque Palatine (French pronunciation: [bɑ̃k palatin]) is a French bank founded in 1780 in Lyon, and is therefore one of the oldest French banks still being run. It is today a full branch subsidiary of the mutual group BPCE. Its core businesses are retail banking with small and medium-sized enterprises, private banking and asset management. Its headquarters is in Paris downtown, in the la Madeleine neighbourhood.

Its long-term debt rating is Aa3 (Moody's).

== Activities ==
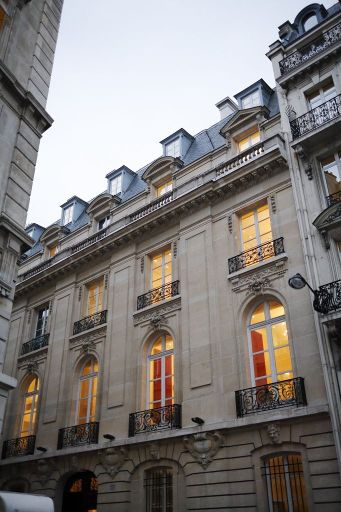
Banque Palatine, rue d'Anjou

=== Wealth management bank ===
The Palatine Bank provides services in three domains: wealth management, investment advice and management of current accounts. Its customers are composed of business executives, members of the liberal professions, middle management, non-residents and pensioners. Within the Palatine Bank the management of the private customer market is devoted to asset management.

=== Bank of firms ===
Banque Palatine offers banking to midcap companies (ETI) whose turnover exceeds 15 million euro: funding projects abroad, corporate finance, real estate consultancy, large companies.

=== Management of assets ===
Palatine Asset Management is the subsidiary of the Palatine Bank specialized in the management of assets. It manages 70 funds.

== History ==
In the end of the 18th century the Vernes family of Ardéchoise origin established in Lyon on the Helvetic bank of the Lake Geneva having taken refuge in the edict of Nantes revocation. The family founded the house of bank Vernes et Compagnie in 1780. This family bank was established in Paris in 1821 and acquired very fast a strong notability in the world of business and a big competence in management of fortunem attaining a reputation comparable to the houses of Rothschild and Mallet. Following the example of other families of Haute Banque8, the Vernes family was intimately linked to the Banque de France directly (Charles Vernes was sub-governor of the Bank of France from 1832 till 1857, Adolphe Vernes was regent from 1886 till 1907 and Jules Félix Vernes was regent from 1921 till 1934) and indirectly by the savoir-faire of the descendants who married daughters or cousins of regents. The family was also linked to the Groupe Caisse d'Épargne (Charles Vernes became censor in 1823, then vice-president in 1844, and Félix Vernes was guiding there in 1879).

In 1871 the home Vernes and Company set up a fund of foresight for its employees to finance their retirement. This fund was financed by sums taken from benefits, and set rights set made the object of nominative capitalization.

In 1972, about a year after the first debates between Jean-Mark Vernes and Marcel Dassault, the Vernes bank merge with the commercial Bank of Paris (in former days Josse, Lippens and Cie until 1952) and constitute then the Vernes bank and commercial of Paris (or BVCP). In 1978 the bank participated in the Bank Michel Inchauspé.

== See also ==
- Fédération Bancaire Française

== Bibliography ==
- Auteurs multiples, Histoire de banques, histoires d'une banque, éditions Télémaque, 2011
- Daniel Karyotis, avec la collaboration de Fabien Piliu, La France qui entreprend, plaidoyer pour les entreprises à fort potentiel de croissance, éditions Democratic books, 2011
