= Groupe Banque Populaire =

French banking group

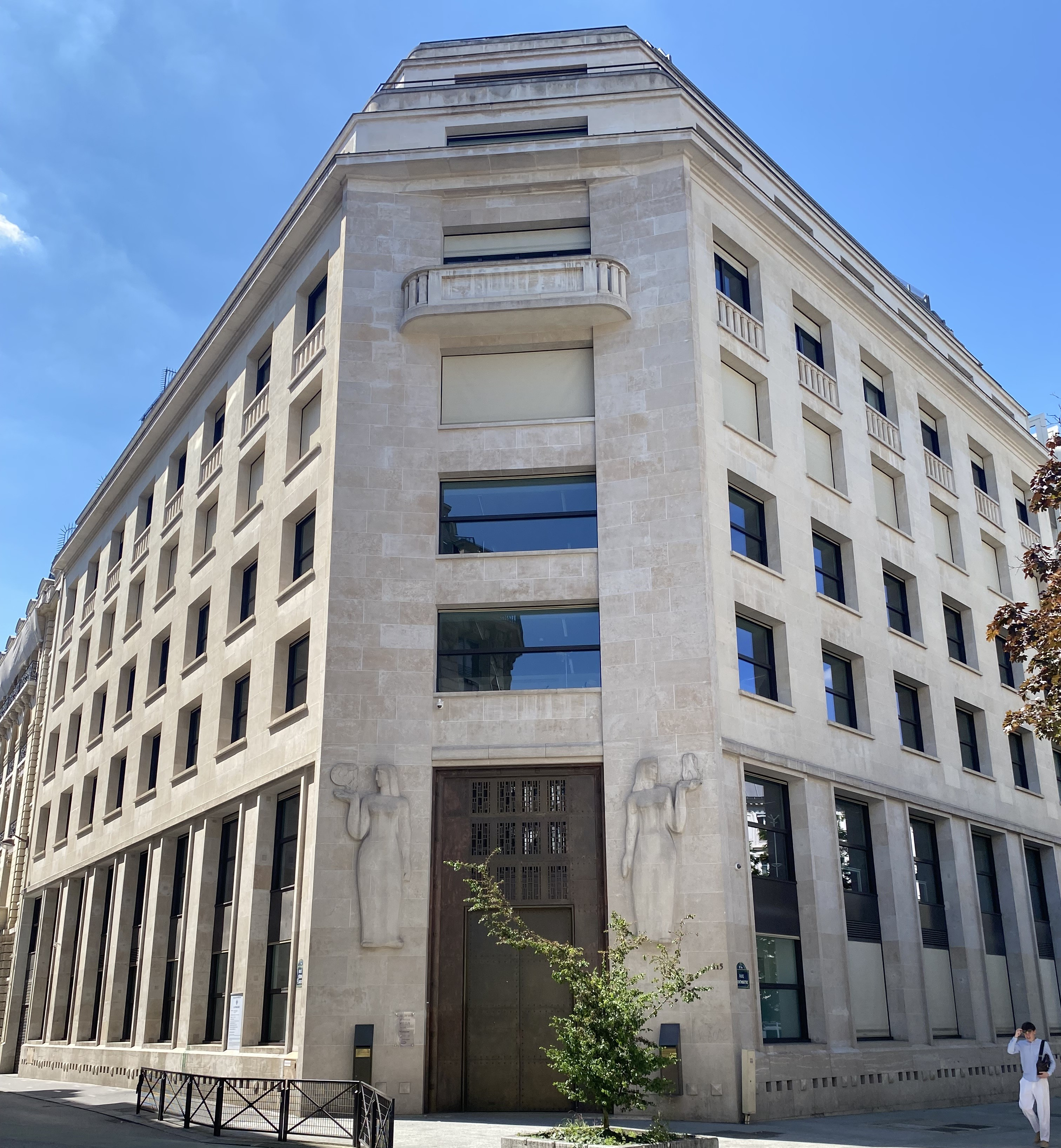
- Building at 115, rue Montmartre in Paris, former head office of Caisse Centrale des Banques Populaires built in the 1950s
- Type: co-operative
- Industry: Banking
- Founded: 1878
- Defunct: 31 July 2009
- Fate: Merger with Groupe Caisse d'Épargne
- Successor: Groupe BPCE
- Headquarters: Paris, France
- Number of employees: 34,500
- Website: www.banquepopulaire.fr

Banque Populaire (French pronunciation: [ɡʁup bɑ̃k pɔpylɛʁ], lit. 'People's Bank') is a French group of cooperative banks, with origins in the European cooperative movement. In 2009, it merged with Groupe Caisse d'Épargne to form Groupe BPCE.

== History ==
Groupe Banque Populaire started in 1878 with the foundation of the first local "people's bank" (French: banque populaire) in the western French city of Angers. During World War I, Commerce Minister Étienne Clémentel was instrumental in passing the law of 13 March 1917 which established the local Popular Banks' cooperative status and granted them favorable financial and tax treatment, with intent to fill the void left by struggling local banks in the market for short-term lending to small businesses. In 1921, the Caisse centrale des Banques populaires (CCBP) was created.

In 1919, the French state sponsored the creation of Crédit National, a specialized bank. In 1946, the French state created Compagnie Française d'Assurance pour le Commerce Extérieur (Coface), a trade credit insurer, and Banque Française du Commerce Extérieur (BFCE), a specialized bank providing export financing services. In 1974, the Social Assistance Bank of the National Education Ministry (French: Caisse d'aide sociale de l'Éducation nationale, CASDEN) joined the Banque Populaire network, later rebranding as CASDEN Banque populaire. In 1996, Crédit National purchased BFCE, and the merged entity renamed itself as Natexis, in which natex is a portmanteau of national and extérieur.

The CCBP purchased Natexis in 1998, and renamed it Natexis Banques Populaires. In 1999, the CCBP was replaced by a new banking entity, the Banque fédérale des banques populaires (BFBP). Natexis Banques Populaires purchased Coface in 2002. That same year, cooperative bank the Crédit coopératif joined the Banque Populaire network.

By the mid-2000s the central entity BFBP was controlled by 15 independent regional banks and also operated CASDEN and Crédit Coopératif as subsidiaries. In 2006, Groupe Banque Populaire and fellow mutual Groupe Caisse d'Épargne agreed to merge their commercial and investment banking subsidiaries, respectively Natexis Banques Populaires and Ixis. The new entity was named Natixis, a portmanteau of Natexis and Ixis. Natixis went through an initial public offering on 25 October 2006, after which BFBP and CNCE (the central entity of Groupe Caisse d'Épargne) each owned 35 percent of its equity capital, the rest being free float.

Natixis, however, soon suffered from poor capital allocation and risk management choices in the context of the 2008 financial crisis, including on investments into Bernie Madoff's funds. Key executives had to resign or were sacked: Nicolas Mérindol and Charles Milhaud, respectively CEO and chairman of CNCE, on 19 October 2008; Bernard Comolet and Bruno Mettling, respectively chairman of Natixis and CEO of BFBP, on 6 March 2009; and Dominique Ferrero, CEO of Natexis, on 29 April 2009.

Partly because of the Natixis fiasco, in October 2008 Groupe Banque Populaire announced plans, since approved by the French government, to merge with Groupe Caisse d'Epargne. The companies merged in 2009 to form the Groupe BPCE and retain their separate retail banking brands and branch networks. Banque Populaire's chief executive officer Philippe Dupont was selected to head the enlarged company.

In 2025, the Group reported having 9.7 million customers and 5 million member-shareholders, served by 12,425 advisors.

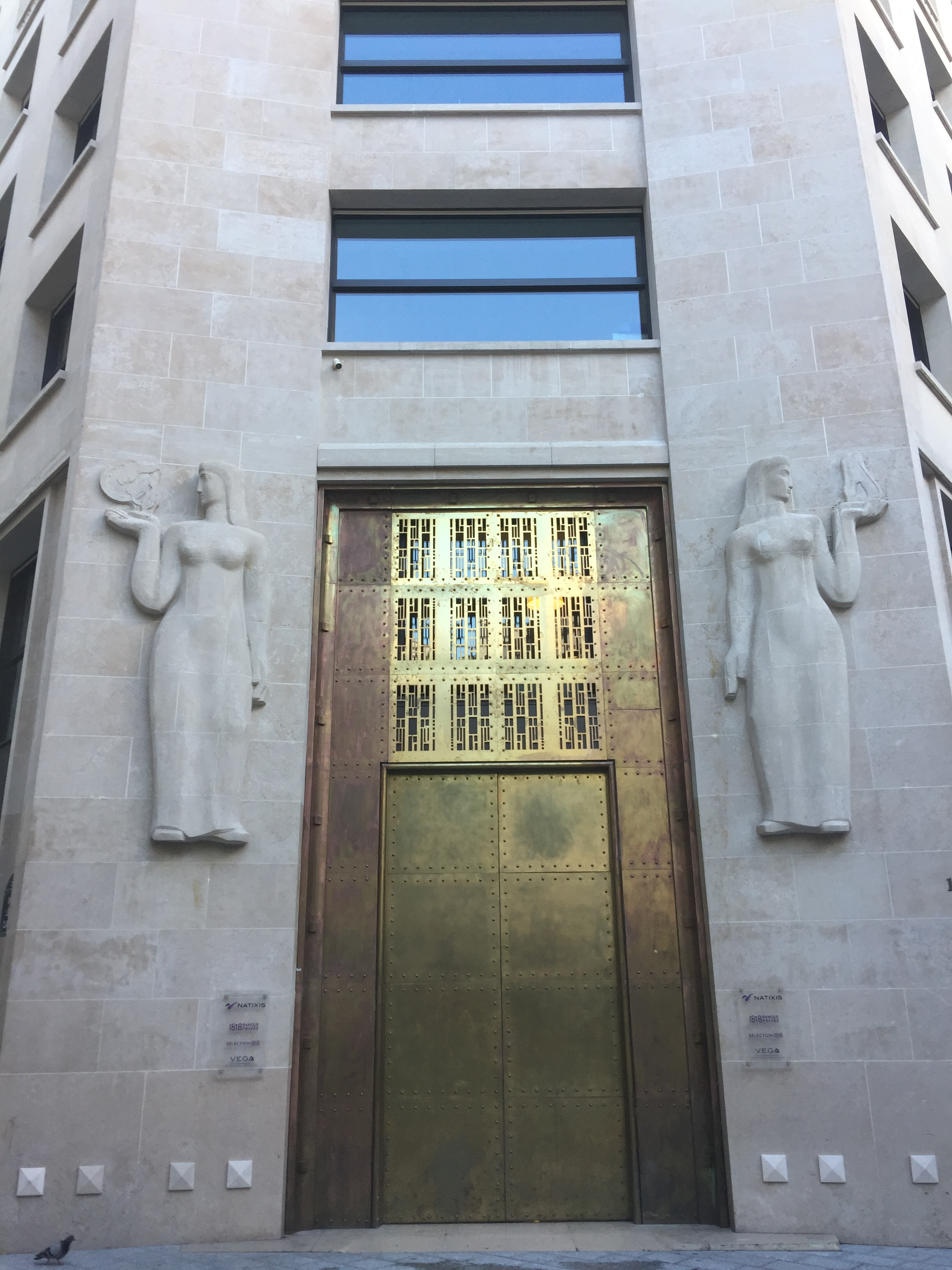
Entrance of the former head office of Caisse Centrale des Banques Populaires, 115 rue Montmartre

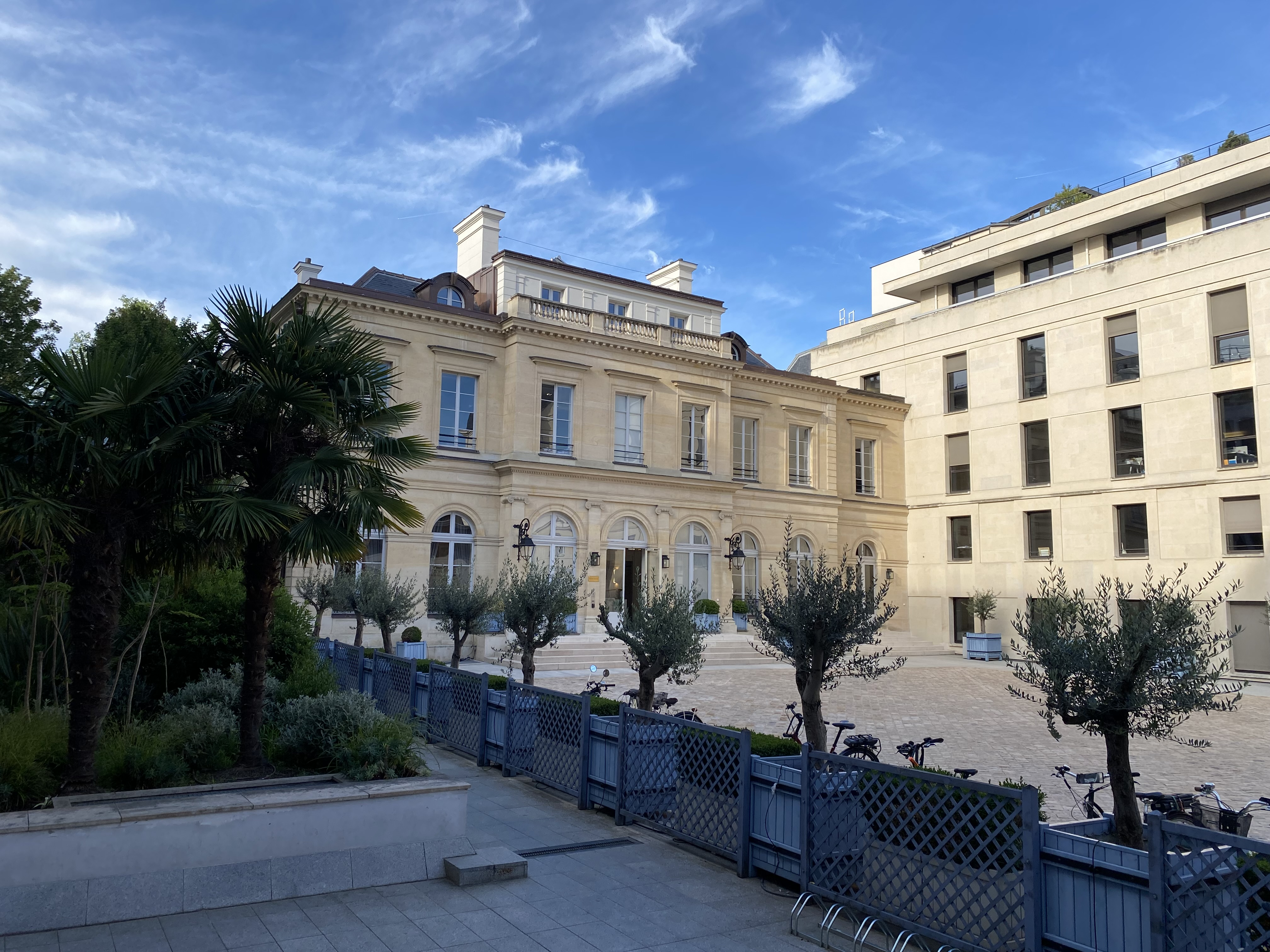
Former head office of Crédit National at 45–47, rue Saint-Dominique in Paris

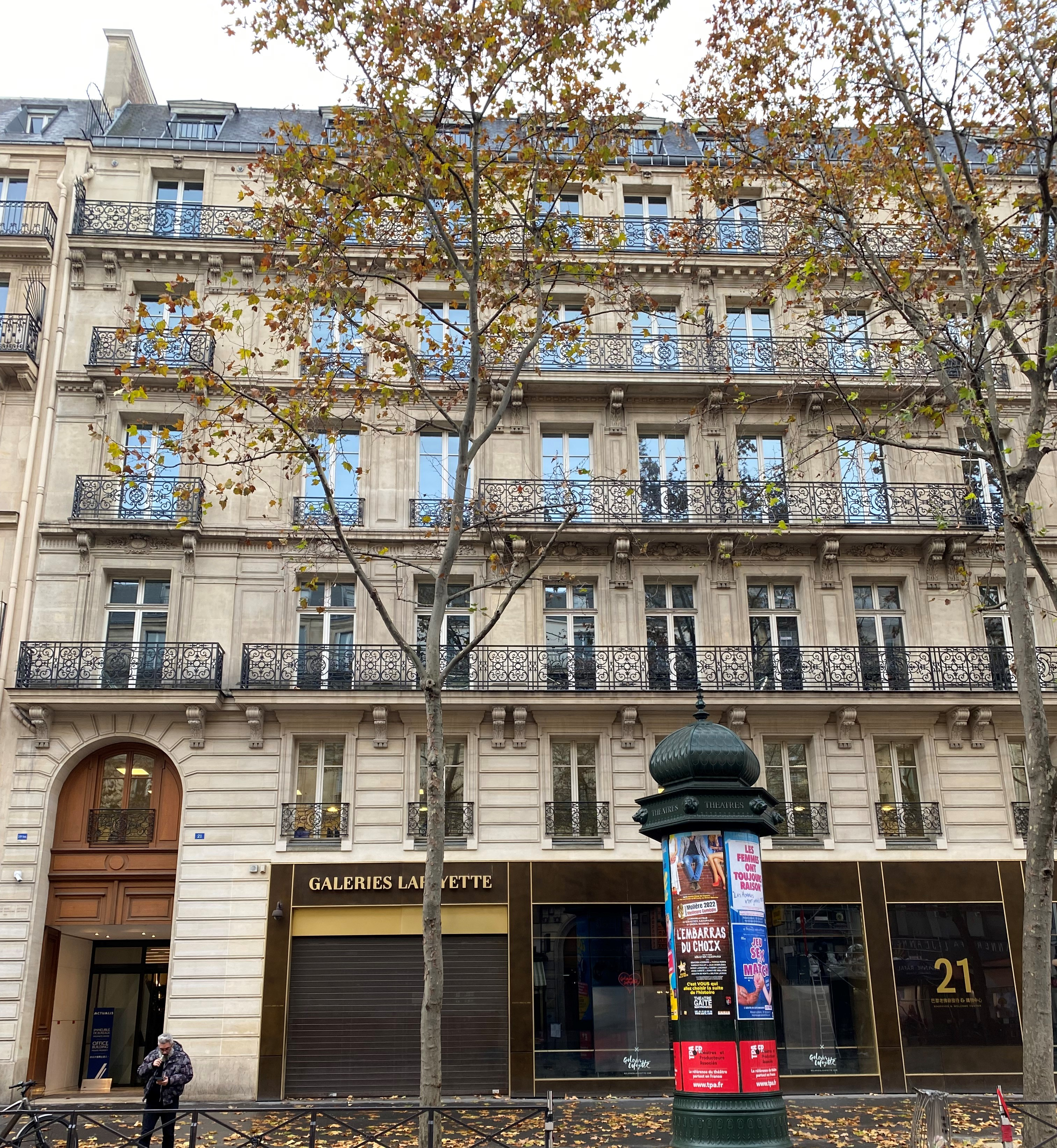
Former head office of Banque Française du Commerce Extérieur at 21, boulevard Haussmann in Paris

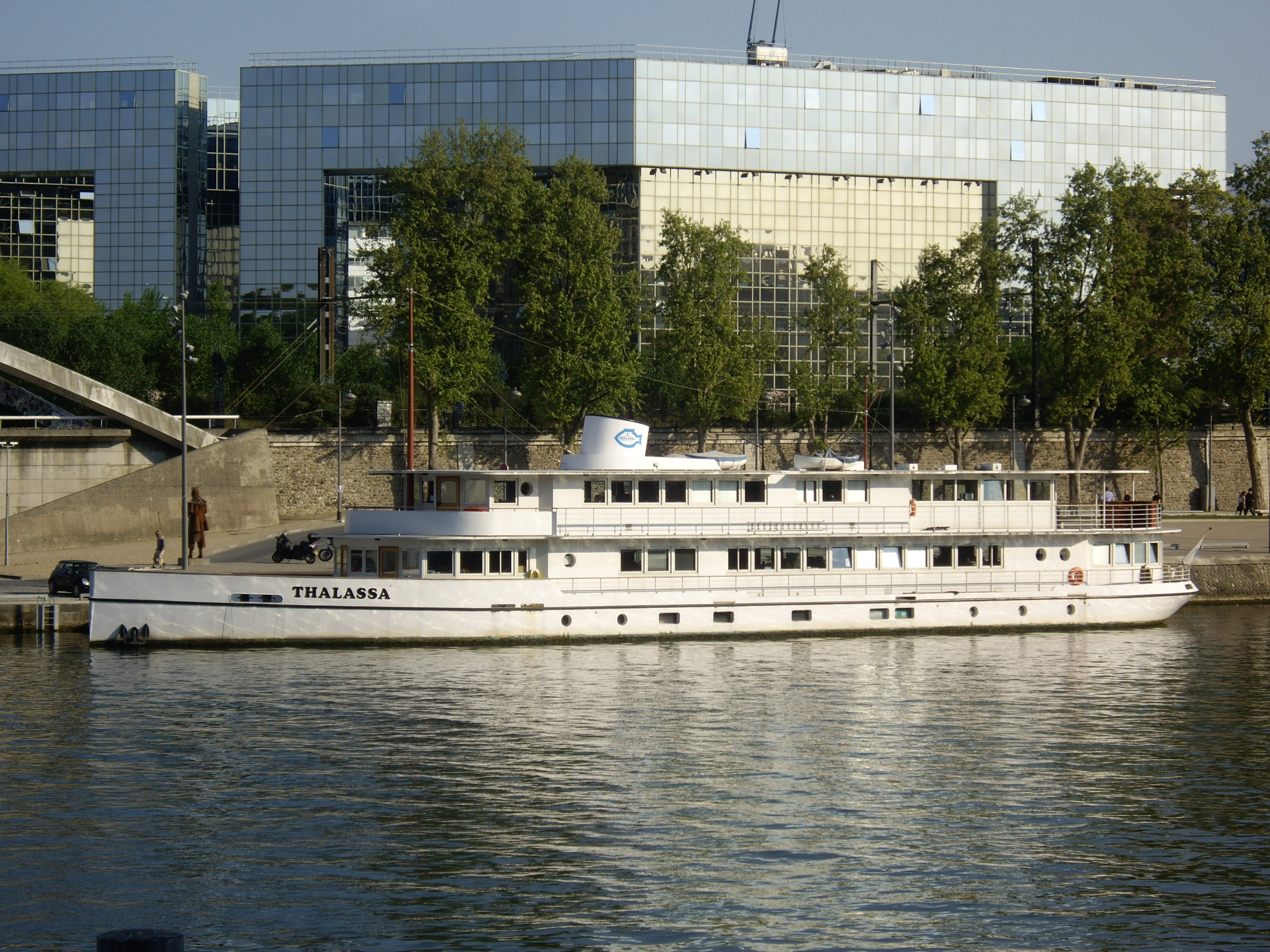
Le Ponant building in Paris, former head office of Banque Fédérale des Banques Populaires

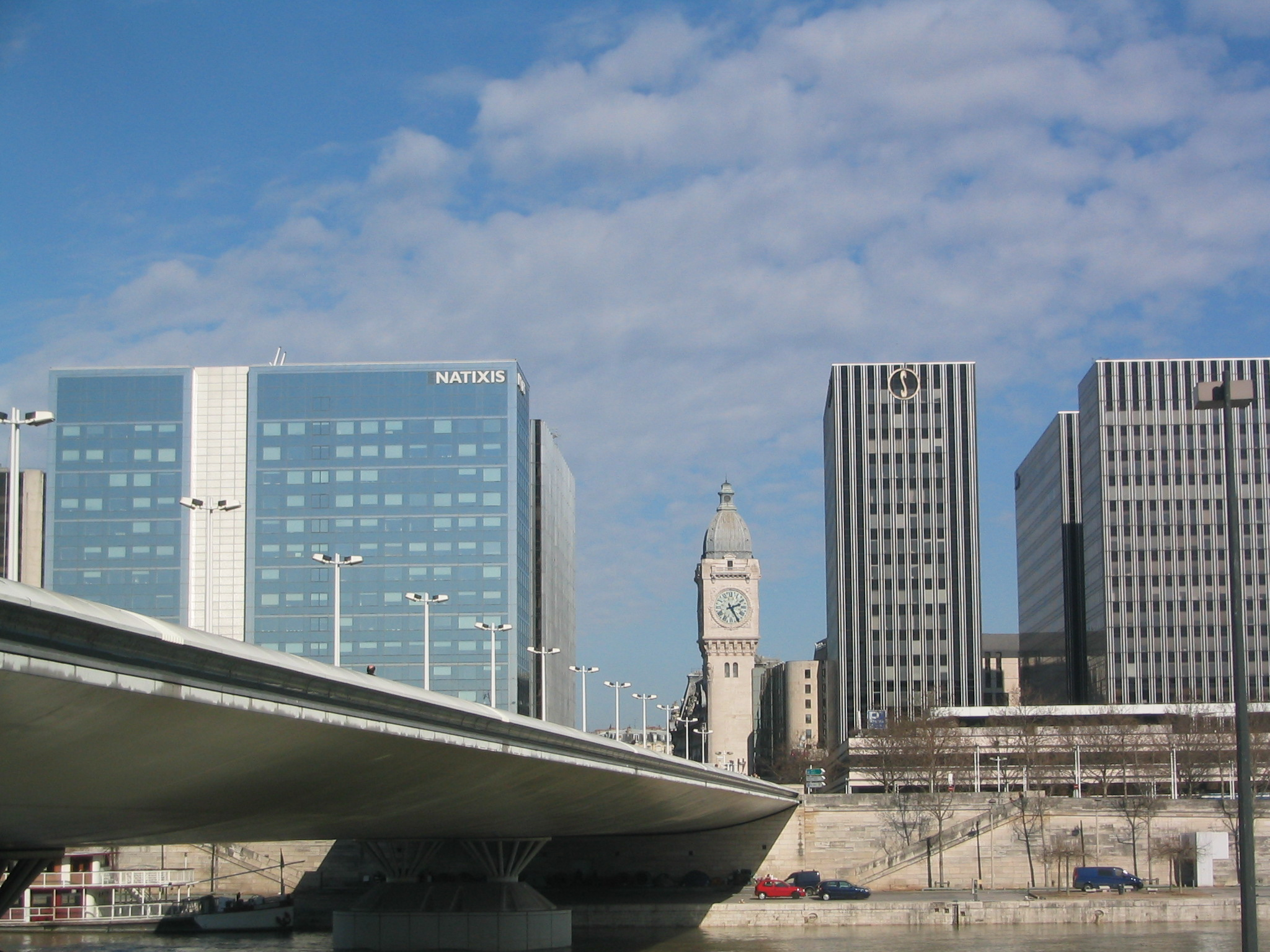
Head office of Natixis in 2007, near the Gare de Lyon

== Sponsorship ==
The bank sponsors sailboats as part of the 'Transat Café L'Or' sporting event.

== See also ==
- Crédit Mutuel
- German Cooperative Financial Group
- KBC Group
- De Volksbank
