= Formula funds =

Formula funds refer to the Federal dollars distributed to the land grant colleges of agriculture through formulas found in the Hatch Act (7 U.S.C. 361a et seq.), the Smith–Lever Act (7 U.S.C. 341 et seq.), the McIntire–Stennis Act (16 U.S.C. 582a et seq.), and the Evans–Allen Act (7 U.S.C. 3222) for (1) agricultural research at the state agricultural experiment stations, (2) Extension Service programs, (3) forestry research at the land grant colleges of agriculture, and (4) research at the 1890 institutions, respectively.
