= BPCE Group =

French banking group

Groupe BPCE

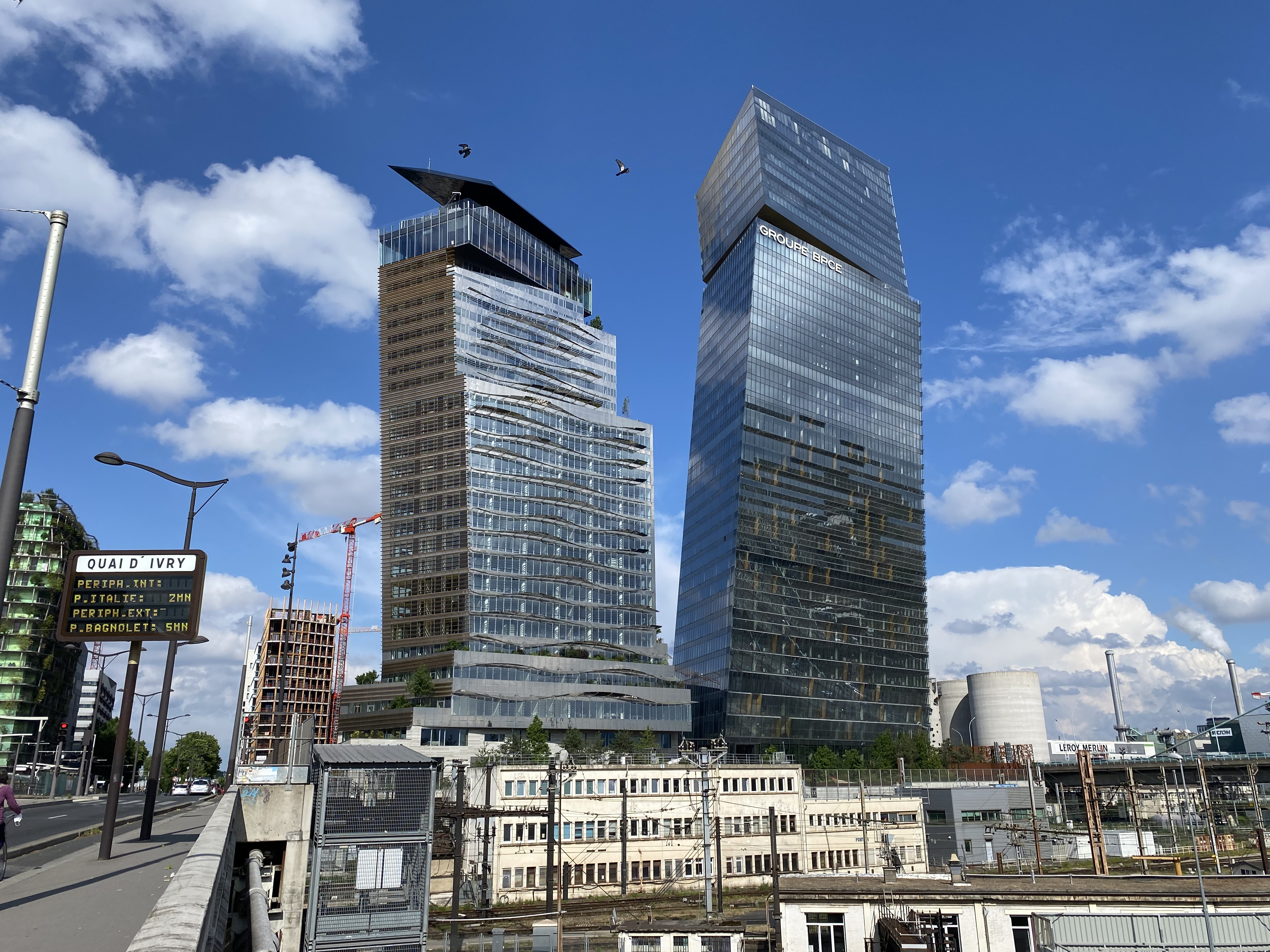
- Tours Duo in Paris, headquarters of Groupe BPCE as of 2022
- Type: Private; Cooperative
- Industry: Financial services
- Founded: 19 December 2006; 19 years ago 31 July 2009; 17 years ago as Groupe BPCE
- Headquarters: Paris, France
- Key people: Nicolas Namias, CEO of BPCE; Stephanie Paix, CEO of Natixis
- Products: Banking and insurance
- Revenue: ▼€25.7 billion (2022)
- Operating income: ▼€7.6 billion (2022)
- Net income: ▼€5.6 billion (2022)
- AUM: ▲€1.317 trillion (2024)
- Total assets: ▲€1,678 trillion (Q1 2026)
- Total equity: ▲€85.5 billion (2022)
- Number of employees: 100,000 (2022)
- Website: www.groupebpce.com/en/

BPCE (for Banque Populaire Caisse d'Epargne) is a major French banking group formed by the 2009 merger of two major retail banking groups, Groupe Caisse d'Épargne and Groupe Banque Populaire. As of 2025, it was France's third-largest bank, and the twenty-first in the world by total assets. It has more than 8,200 branches nationwide under their respective brand names serving nearly 150 million customers. Its wholesale banking subsidiary Natixis, previously a separately listed company, was delisted and came under full ownership of Groupe BPCE in 2021.

According to S&P Global's April 2026 report, BPCE is Europe's sixth largest bank by assets, with $1.986 trillion in assets.

BPCE has been designated as a Significant Institution since the entry into force of European Banking Supervision in late 2014, and as a consequence is directly supervised by the European Central Bank. It is also designated as a global systemically important bank (G-SIB) by the Financial Stability Board.

== History ==
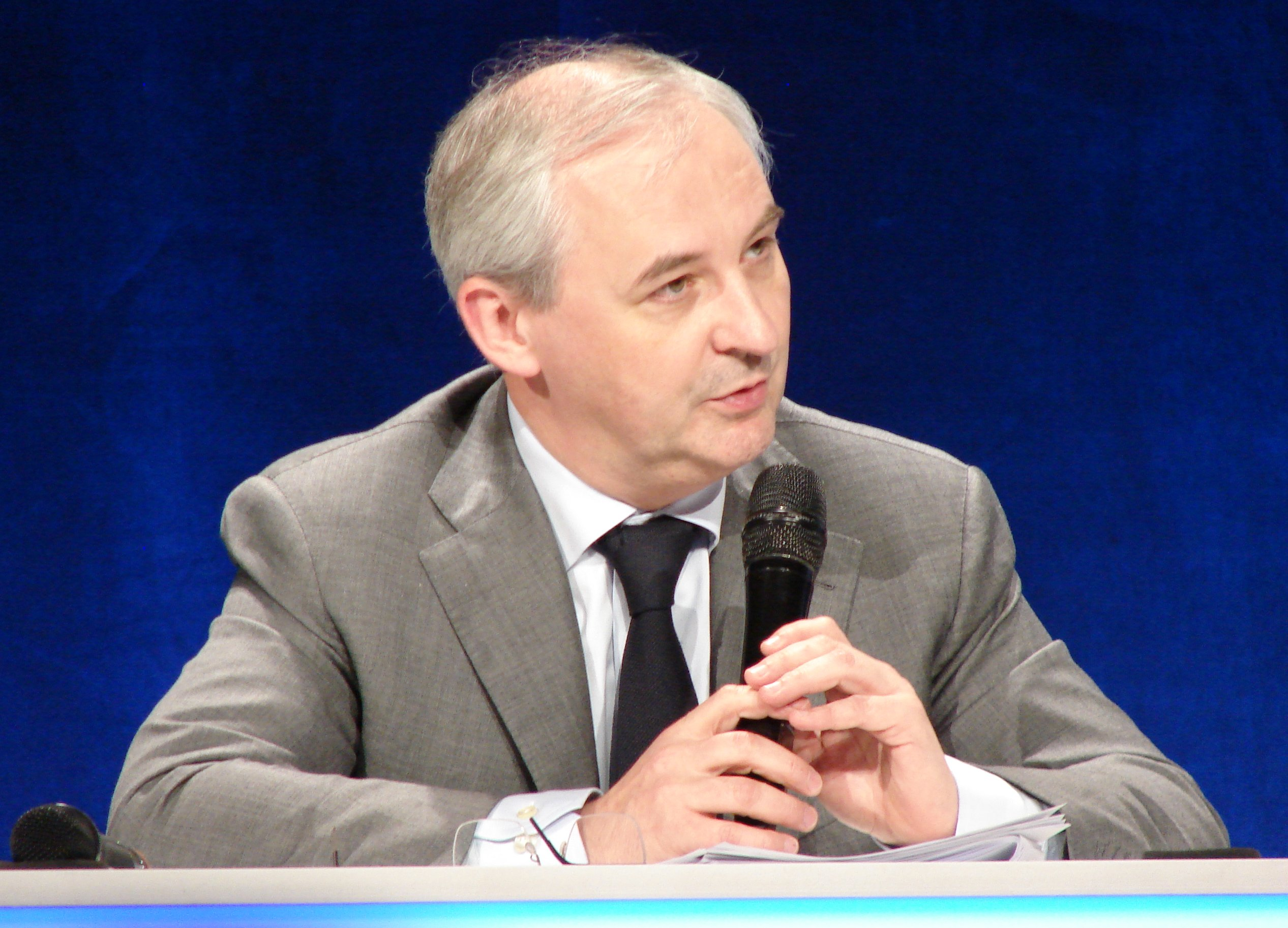
François Pérol was the architect of the creation of Groupe BPCE, which he subsequently led for nearly a decade.

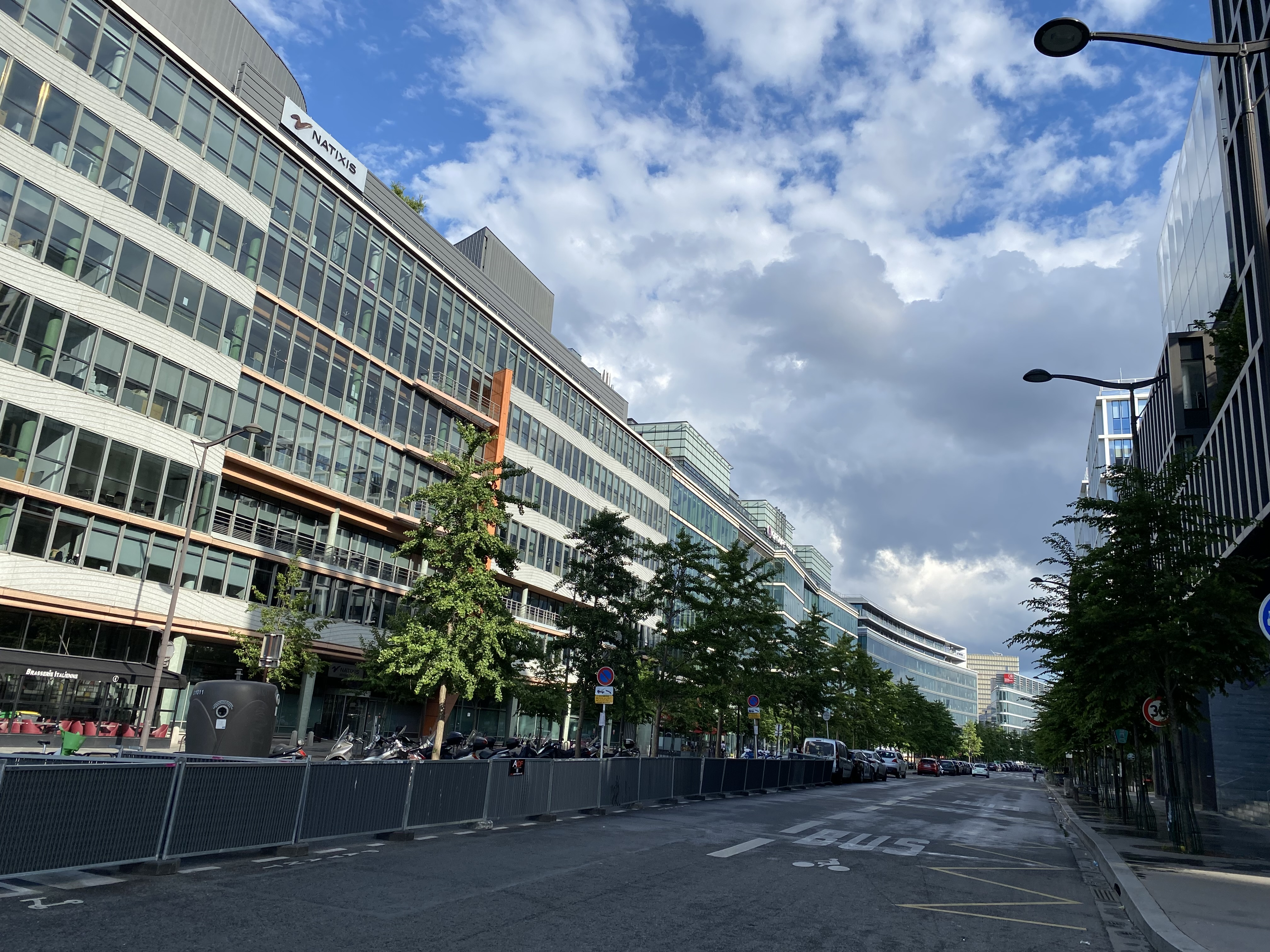
Before moving to the Tours Duo in 2022, Groupe BPCE and Natixis were headquartered respectively on 50 and 30, Avenue Pierre-Mendès-France in Paris, flanked on both ends by office buildings of the Caisse des dépôts et consignations.

In 2008 and early 2009, the French state provided €5 billion in financial support to the group formed by Caisse d'Épargne, Banque Populaire and their joint venture Natixis. The package consisted of €3 billion in preferred shares and €2 billion in deeply subordinated notes. François Pérol, then a senior aide to President Nicolas Sarkozy, was closely involved in the decisions that led to the restructuring of the group. The new entity, created from the merger of CNCE and BFBP under the name BPCE, was formed on 31 July 2009. On the same day, Pérol became its chief executive officer, while Philippe Dupont, previously chairman of Groupe Banque Populaire, became non-executive chairman of BPCE.

In 2014, BPCE listed Coface through an initial public offering and later reduced its stake in the company. As of March 2021, BPCE retained a residual holding of 12.7 percent of Coface's capital.

In July 2016, BPCE announced the acquisition of Fidor Bank, a fintech challenger bank operating in the United Kingdom and Germany. By November 2018, however, the group was reported to be considering a sale of the bank.

In 2018, BPCE sold its African banking operations to Morocco's BCP Group. The assets included a 68 percent stake in Banque Internationale du Cameroun pour l'Epargne et le Crédit (BICEC), a 71 percent stake in Banque Malgache de l'Océan Indien (BMOI), full ownership of the Brazzaville-based Banque Commerciale Internationale (BCI), and 60 percent of Banque Tuniso-Koweitienne.

Between 2018 and 2019, BPCE integrated the former activities of Crédit Foncier de France into its other businesses and ended the use of the Crédit Foncier brand. In June and July 2021, the group acquired the Natixis shares it did not already own, and the delisting of Natixis was completed on 31 July 2021. In July 2024, BPCE, through Caisse d'Epargne Hauts de France, acquired the Belgian private bank Nagelmackers.

=== New round of acquisitions (since 2025) ===
On 21 January 2025, BPCE and the Italian insurer Generali announced that they had signed a non-binding memorandum of understanding to combine their asset management operations in an equally owned joint venture. The planned venture would have had around €1.9 trillion in assets under management and would have included Natixis Investment Managers and its affiliates, notably Ostrum Asset Management. However, on 11 December 2025, Generali and BPCE announced that they had ended negotiations on the proposed joint venture between their asset management businesses.

In June 2025, BPCE acquired the 75 percent stake in Portuguese lender Novo Banco held by the U.S. private equity fund Lone Star, in a transaction valued at €6.4 billion. On 29 October 2025, BPCE signed an agreement with the Portuguese government and the country's Resolution Fund to acquire the remaining 25 percent of Novo Banco for €1.6 billion, which would give the group full ownership of the bank. The acquisition of Novo Banco was finalised in April 2026, when BPCE obtained control over 100% of the capital of the Portuguese lender.

In October 2026, BPCE bought a 7% stake in Spanish lender Banco Sabadell.

== Structure and operations ==
Despite the 2009 merger, the two networks of local banks, Caisse d'Épargne and Banque Populaire, continue to operate under separate and to an extent competing brands. BPCE is fully owned by local savings banks and popular banks, which in turn are legally owned by their customers as cooperative members.

BPCE provides various deposit and loan products to small and medium enterprises, craftspeople, franchisees, and franchisers; savings collection and management, credit, payment, and wealth management services; and real estate financing and corporate banking services. The company also offers bancassurance products, including life assurance and pensions that comprise automobile and home insurance, legal protection, the guarantee of life accidents, the supplementary health care insurance, welfare professionals and the collective retirement pensions and health, as well as credit insurance and guarantees to individuals, professionals, real estate professionals, and businesses.

== Leadership ==
Groupe BPCE has had three chief executives (French: président du directoire) so far:

- François Pérol (July 2009 - May 2018)
- Laurent Mignon (June 2018 – December 2022)
- Nicolas Namias (December 2022 – present)

== Controversies ==
In 2010 the French government's competition authority, the Autorité de la concurrence, fined eleven banks, including Groupe BPCE, 385 million euros in the context of the French check processing fee controversy of 2010.

== See also ==
- BNP Paribas
- Société Générale
- Crédit Agricole
- Crédit Mutuel
- List of banks in France
- List of banks in the euro area
- List of European cooperative banks
