= Vital Roux =

French businessman

Vital Roux (1766–1846) was a French businessman. He notably is co-founder of ESCP business school.
