= Het Woeden der Gehele Wereld (film) =

- Theatrical release poster
- Directed by: Guido Pieters
- Screenplay by: Robert van den Berg
- Based on: Het Woeden der Gehele Wereld by Maarten 't Hart
- Produced by: Rob Houwer
- Starring: Maarten Heijmans
- Cinematography: Remko Schnorr
- Edited by: Ton Ruys
- Music by: Bas van Otterloo
- Distributed by: Universal Pictures (through United International Pictures)
- Release date: 13 March 2006
- Running time: 118 minutes
- Country: Netherlands
- Language: Dutch

Het Woeden der Gehele Wereld is a 2006 Dutch film, based on the novel of the same name by Maarten 't Hart. It was directed by Guido Pieters and produced by Rob Houwer. The title translates as "The fury/rage/raging of the whole world" and is derived from a song with lyrics by René-François Sully-Prudhomme, set to music by Gabriel Fauré.

The film was released on 13 March 2006 and was a critical and commercial failure.

== Plot ==
The film is set in Maassluis and Leiden, in the time of the German occupation in the 1940s, and the 1950s. It is about the coming of age of Alex Goudveyl (Maarten Heijmans), and about the murder of a police officer.

For profit, in May 1940 Joost Vroom (Cees Geel) takes refugees (mainly Jews) on his boat to escape to England. However, the boat is attacked by the Germans. They survive, but the escape fails and the boat and the money are lost.

The Goudveyl couple has a business of second-hand goods, and profits from the persecution of Jews by cheaply buying goods of Jews who have to flee the country.

Vroom becomes a police officer, first under the German occupation. He betrays Jews for profit, to recover his loss on the boat. After the war, he remains a police officer.

Alex loves playing piano and is very talented. Very inconsiderately his father sells the family's piano when he is offered a good price for it, much to Alex's regret. Sometimes Alex can play piano or organ elsewhere.

Vroom is ephebophile and, for example, pays Alex for simulating masturbation with an eel between his legs substituting for his penis, so that Vroom can film it (in the book Vroom pays for seeing and touching boys' penises; the film's variation may have been chosen to allow visualization, while keeping it decent). Alex has a gay friend William Keenids, who sometimes likes to cross-dress. We see a scene where William is in Vroom's home, with the little film of Alex being projected on a screen, and William willingly starting to undress while Vroom is filming. It is not revealed whether this is for money. In another scene, William tries to have some physical intimacy with Alex, but Alex rejects it, arguing that he is not Vroom.

Aaron Oberstein's wife died in the war. He does not know what happened to his baby son. In 1956 Vroom claims he knows who and where he is and offers to tell it for a large sum of money. Aaron brings the money at the agreed place, the warehouse of the Goudveyls. An evangelisation campaign is going on outside, while Alex plays the piano inside. Vroom is murdered by a gunshot. Alex is a witness to the murder and is afraid he will be killed later because of that.

As a student, Alex has sex with Yvonne, the assistant of the professor, in an empty lecture room, at her initiative. At first, Alex is willing, but when she wants more he walks away. On a second occasion, when he has Joanna Oberstein as his girlfriend, he refuses sex with Yvonne. Now she threatens him with a knife. Then her boss enters the room and Alex can escape. Yvonne is fired.

Alex's parents confess to Alex that in the war they could buy their business cheaply because the owners were deported Jews. The parents say there is another important thing to tell, but they hesitate and do not tell it yet. Soon after this, Alex's parents die of carbon monoxide poisoning.

It turns out that Alex's parents were not his biological parents. His biological mother died in the war, his biological father is Aaron Oberstein, the father of Alex's girlfriend. Thus Alex's girlfriend is his half-sister.

Aaron did not know that Alex was his son. The Goudveyl couple was childless, and Alex was illegally supplied to them by Vroom for profit. The couple was blackmailed by Vroom regarding this. Therefore, Alex's foster mother murdered Vroom. Since she is dead now, the case is closed.

== Cast ==
- Maarten Heijmans as Alex Goudveyl
- Peter Drost as father Goudveyl
- Ottelien Boeschoten as mother Goudveyl
- Cees Geel as Joost Vroom
- Bart de Vries as Aaron Oberstein
- Viviënne van den Assem as Ruth Oberstein
- Anna Speller as Joanna Oberstein
- Nyncke Beekhuyzen as Judith Oberstein
- Frederik Brom as Arnold Oberstein
- Esther Waij as Yvonne Varekamp
- Peer Mascini as reverend Meewers
- Joost Prinsen as Inspector Graswinckel
- Frank Lammers as Inspector Douvetrap
- Bob Radstaak as William Keenids

== Production ==
=== Filming ===
The filming was partly done at the Barrandov Studios

=== Differences with the book ===
(incomplete)

- Joost Vroom is called Arend Vroombout in the book.
- The book does not reveal who is the murderer.

=== True event ===
In 1956 a murder was committed in Maassluis during an evangelisation gathering, when Maarten ’t Hart was 12 years old.

== Release ==
=== Comments by Maarten 't Hart ===
Maarten 't Hart commented that the film is quite different from the book. He is fine with the film, but, apart from the fact that it was based on his book, he was not and did not want to be involved in it. He especially likes how Inspector Douvetrap with his son with Down syndrome is depicted, just like it is described in the book.

=== Home media ===
The film was released on DVD by Universal Pictures Benelux on 7 December 2006.
