= Het psalmenoproer =

Novel by Maarten 't Hart

- Author: Maarten 't Hart
- Language: Dutch
- Publisher: De Arbeiderspers
- Publication date: 2006
- Publication place: Netherlands
- Pages: 283
- ISBN: 9789029564083

Het psalmenoproer is a novel by Dutch author Maarten 't Hart. It was first published in 2006. The novel is situated in Maassluis, the birthplace of the author.

It is set between 1739 and 1811. Main character is Roemer Stroombreker, ship owner in Maassluis.
