= De kroongetuige =

Novel by Maarten 't Hart

- First edition
- Author: Maarten 't Hart
- Cover artist: Jean Siméon Chardin, Boy with a Spinning-Top, 1738
- Language: Dutch
- Publisher: De Arbeiderspers
- Publication date: 1983
- Publication place: Netherlands
- Pages: 212

De kroongetuige is a novel by Dutch author Maarten 't Hart. It was first published in 1983.

== Background ==
The Key Witness is a psychological novel with a crime plot. According to 't Hart, literary genres were not as strictly defined in the 19th century as they were in the 20th. Literary crime novels were quite common. With The Key Witness, he wanted to revive that genre. Incidentally, he had already written a novel with a crime theme, I Had a Brother-in-Arms. Later, in 1993, he even received the Gouden Strop Award for the novel The Rage of the Whole World.

The book isn’t just about the crime; marriage also plays an important role. This is evident from Leonie’s statement: “Aren’t most marriages such that one doesn’t want a third party as a key witness? And yet this very third party is almost never absent—the child—and that child is more than a key witness; namely, the scapegoat.” Leonie herself is also the key witness in the crime plot; she is the one who discovers the body and tracks down the real key witness.
