= De jacobsladder =

Novel by Maarten 't Hart

- First edition
- Author: Maarten 't Hart
- Language: Dutch
- Publisher: De Arbeiderspers
- Publication date: 1986
- Publication place: Netherlands
- Pages: 206
- ISBN: 9029519568

De jacobsladder is a novel by Dutch author Maarten 't Hart. It was first published in 1986. The title is derived from the Book of Genesis: Jacob's dream at Bethel. It is one of his novels about his hometown Maassluis and the island of Rozenburg and the complete removal of the village of Blankenburg on this island that had to make way for new canals and industry of what is now the Europoort area.
