= De nakomer =

Novel by Maarten 't Hart

- First edition
- Author: Maarten 't Hart
- Language: Dutch
- Publisher: De Arbeiderspers
- Publication date: 1996
- Publication place: Netherlands
- Pages: 281
- ISBN: 9029520744

De nakomer is a novel by Dutch author Maarten 't Hart. It was first published in 1996.
