= Het Woeden der Gehele Wereld =

1996 novel by Maarten 't Hart

- First edition (publ. De Arbeiderspers)
- Author: Maarten 't Hart
- Language: Dutch
- Publisher: De Arbeiderspers
- Publication date: September 1, 1993
- ISBN: 9789029520317

Het Woeden der Gehele Wereld (transl. The Rage of the Universe) is a 1993 Dutch novel by Maarten 't Hart. The title is derived from the text of the poem Au bord de l'eau by Sully Prudhomme, set to music by Gabriel Fauré. It is about the coming of age of Alex Goudveyl, who is bullied by other children and protected by Vroombout, and about a murder that took place some ten years after the time of the German occupation of the Netherlands in World War II.

It is the basis of a Dutch 2006 film, Het Woeden der Gehele Wereld, directed by Guido Pieters, and produced by Rob Houwer.

== Comments by the author ==
Maarten 't Hart has commented that the film is quite different from the book. He is fine with the film, but, apart from the fact that it was based on his book, he was not and did not want to be involved in it. He especially likes how Inspector Douvetrap and his son with Down syndrome are depicted, just as described in the book.
