= Ik had een wapenbroeder =

Novel by Maarten 't Hart

- 1978 edition
- Author: Maarten 't Hart
- Cover artist: Friso Henstra
- Language: Dutch
- Publisher: De Arbeiderspers
- Publication place: Netherlands

Ik had een wapenbroeder is a novel by Dutch author Maarten 't Hart. It was first published in 1973.
