= Mariekerke =

Mariekerke is the name of several locations:

- Mariekerke, Belgium, near Bornem in the province of Antwerp.
- Mariekerke, Netherlands, a former municipality in the province of Zeeland
- Klein Mariekerke, a hamlet in Zeeland, formerly in the municipality of Mariekerke.
