= Onder de korenmaat =

Novel by Maarten 't Hart

- First edition
- Author: Maarten 't Hart
- Language: Dutch
- Publisher: De Arbeiderspers
- Publication date: 1991
- Publication place: Netherlands

Onder de korenmaat is a novel by Dutch author Maarten 't Hart. It was first published in 1991.
