= De steile helling =

1988 novel by Maarten 't Hart

- First edition
- Author: Maarten 't Hart
- Language: Dutch
- Publisher: De Arbeiderspers
- Publication date: 1988
- Publication place: Netherlands

De steile helling (transl. The Steep Slope) is a semi-autobiographical novel by Dutch author Maarten 't Hart. It was first published in 1988.
