= De droomkoningin =

Novel by Maarten 't Hart

- First edition
- Author: Maarten 't Hart
- Cover artist: Claude Monet, Woman in a Garden, 1867
- Language: Dutch
- Publisher: De Arbeiderspers
- Publication date: 1980
- Publication place: Netherlands

De droomkoningin is a novel by Dutch author Maarten 't Hart. It was first published in 1980.

== Plot ==
Musicologist Metten Anker is walking home after a fling. On his way, he tries to recall the various women in his life.
