= De aansprekers =

Novel by Maarten 't Hart

- First edition
- Language: Dutch
- Publisher: De Arbeiderspers
- Publication date: 1979
- Publication place: Netherlands

De aansprekers is a novel by Dutch author Maarten 't Hart. It was first published in 1979.
