= Aagtekerke =

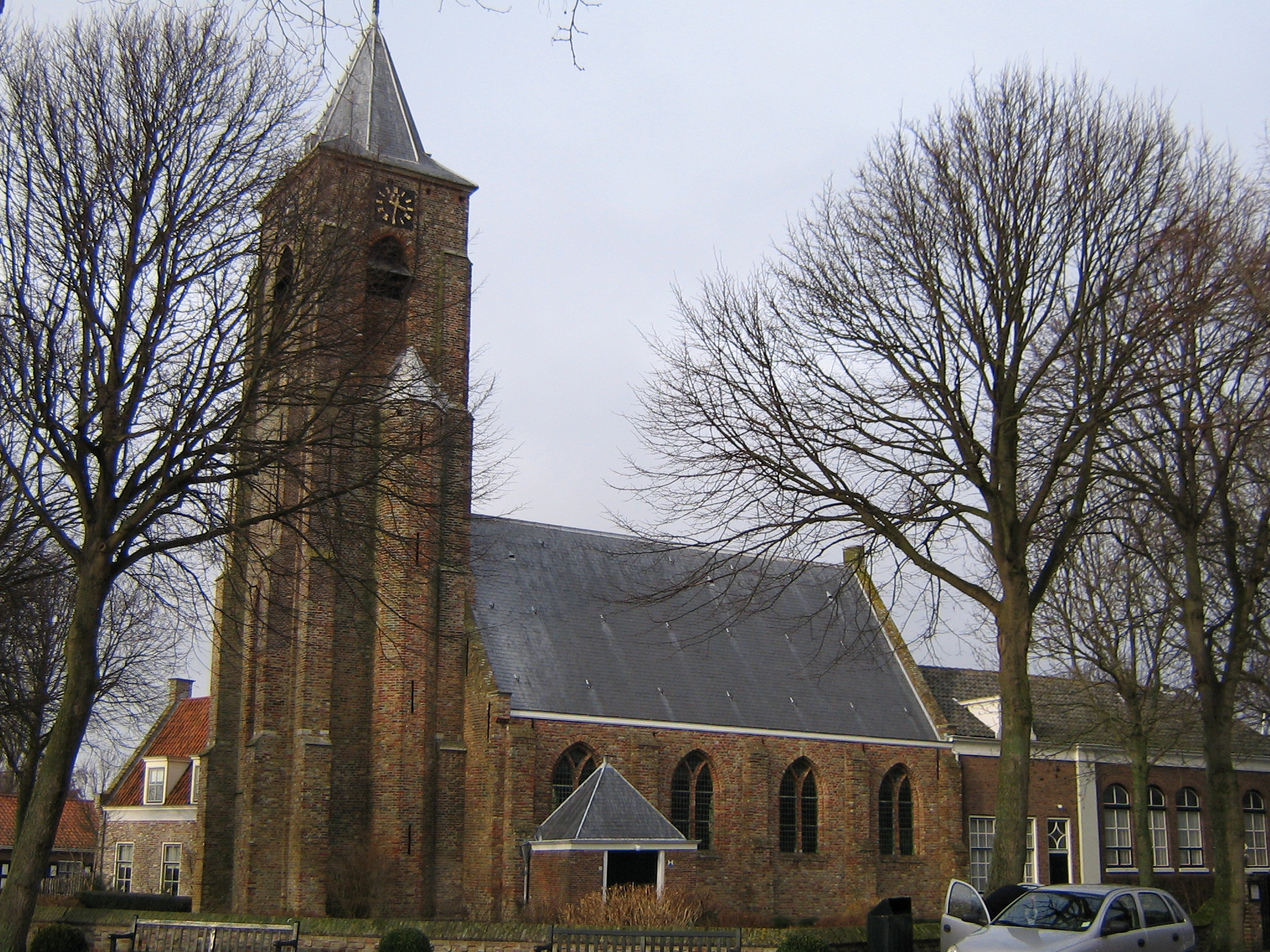

- Seal

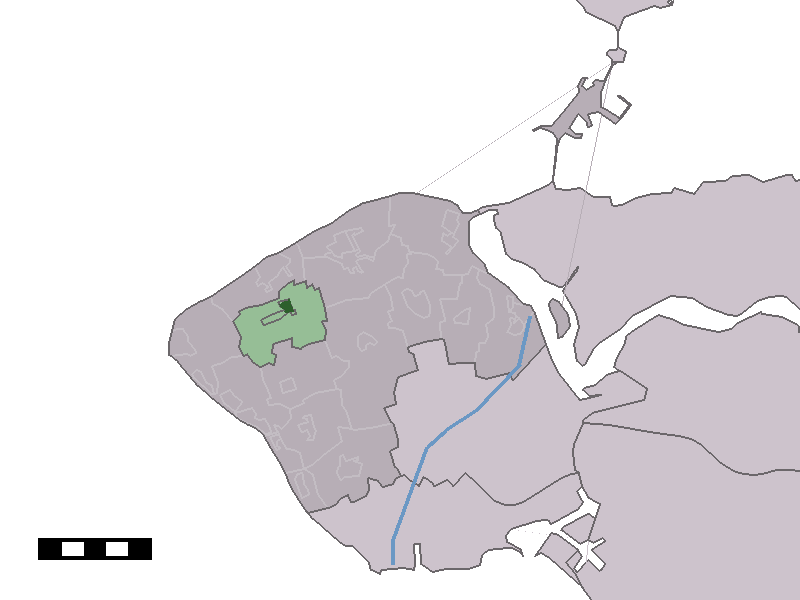
- Location in Veere

- Location in the Netherlands Aagtekerke (Netherlands) Aagtekerke (Europe)
- Coordinates: 51°33′N 3°31′E
- Country: Netherlands
- Province: Zeeland
- Municipality: Veere

Area
  - Total: 9.91 km^{2} (3.83 sq mi)
- Elevation: 1.0 m (3.3 ft)

Population (2021)
  - Total: 1,480
  - Density: 149/km^{2} (387/sq mi)
- Time zone: UTC+1 (CET)
  - Summer (DST): UTC+2 (CEST)
- Postal code: 4363
- Dialing code: 0118

Aagtekerke (Dutch pronunciation: [ˈaːxtəˌkɛrkə]) is a village in the Dutch province of Zeeland. It is a part of the municipality of Veere, and lies about 9 km (6 mi) northwest of Middelburg.

== History ==
The village was first mentioned in 1327 as "in atrio Sanctae Agathae", and means church dedicated to Agatha of Sicily. The St Agatha Church in Domburg was disassembled around 1320 and moved to the Aagtekerke. Aagtekerke is a circular village around the church.

The Dutch Reformed church the successor of the medieval church. The tower was built in the 15th century, and the nave received its current shape in 1625. At the end of the 13th century, a Cistercian nunnery was established in Aagtekerke. It was destroyed somewhere between 1572 and 1574 during the Dutch Revolt.

Aagtekerke was home to 380 people in 1840. Until 1 July 1966, Aagtekerke was a separate municipality. On that date, it was merged into the municipality of Mariekerke.

Aagtekerke is a conservative Protestant village, located in the Dutch Bible Belt. In the 2010 municipal elections, 62 percent of the local population voted for the Reformed Political Party (SGP). The three Christian parties in the elections (the Reformed Political Party, the ChristianUnion and the Christian Democratic Appeal) gained a combined total of almost 70 percent of the votes.

== Gallery ==
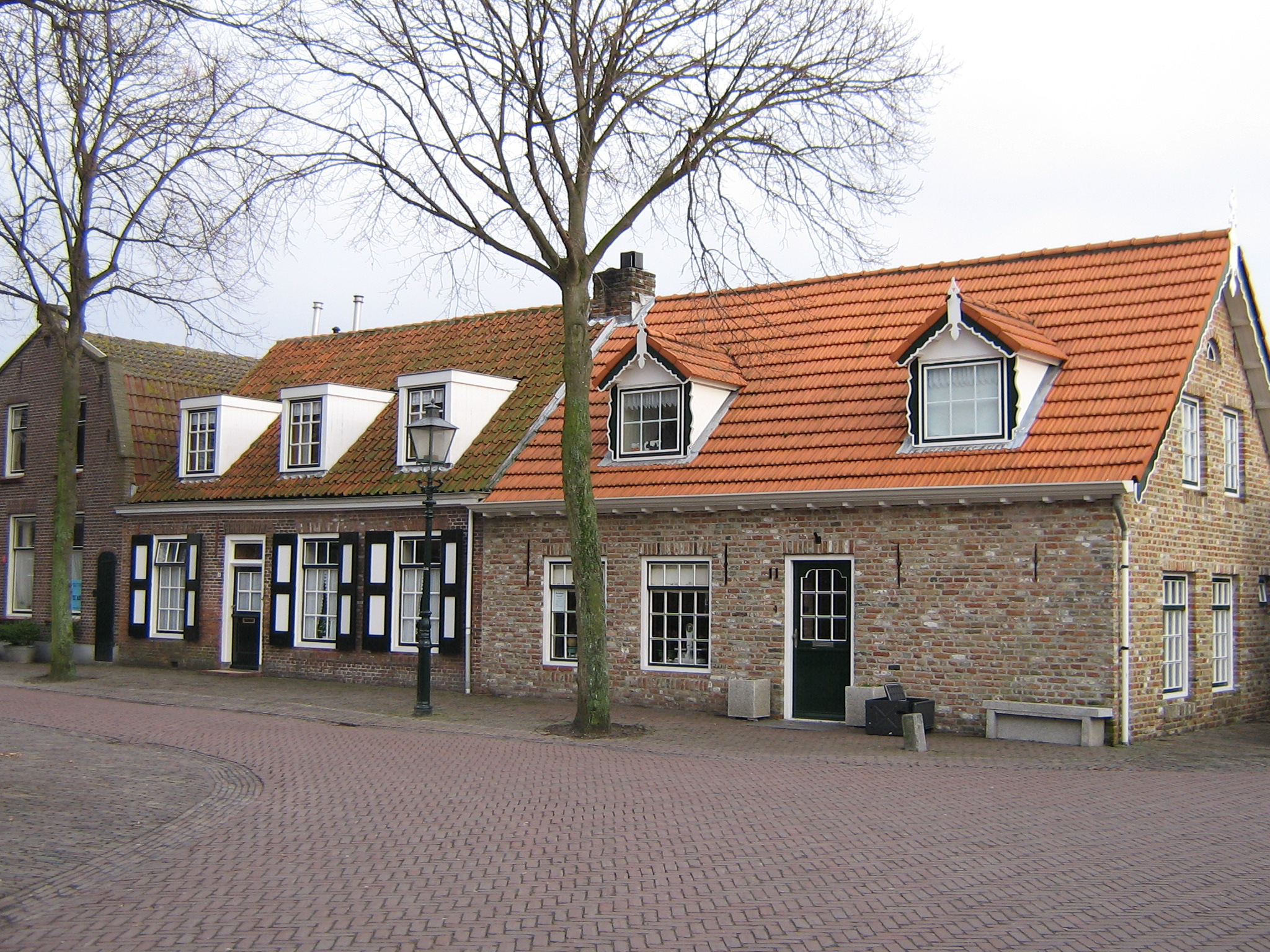
Houses on the village square

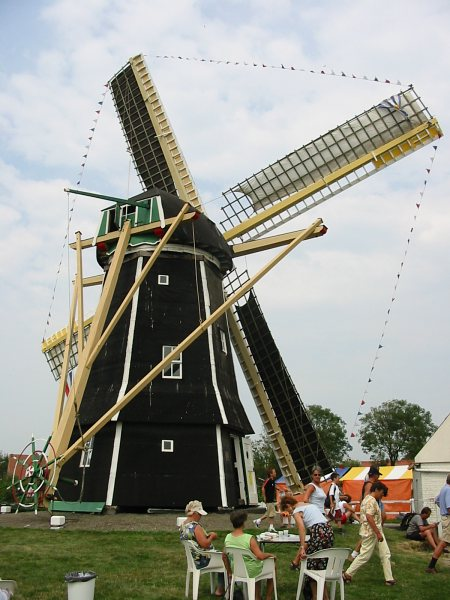
Aagtekerkse mill
