= Cornelis Lievense =

Dutch businessman

Cornelis Lievense (1890 – September 22, 1949) was a Dutch businessman who ran several import/export companies in the United States from the 1920s through the 1940s.

Lievense was born in Maassluis, The Netherlands, and came to the United States in 1924. During his career in the United States, Lievense was the President or director of a number of import/export companies and banks, most notably the Union Banking Corporation, whose assets were seized by the United States government in 1942 under the Trading with the Enemy Act and the Domestic Fuel Corporation, which was blacklisted by the Canadian government in 1940 for similar suspicions.

Lievense died at his home in Ridgewood, New Jersey, on September 22, 1949 at the age of 59.
