= Franca Treur =

Dutch writer and journalist

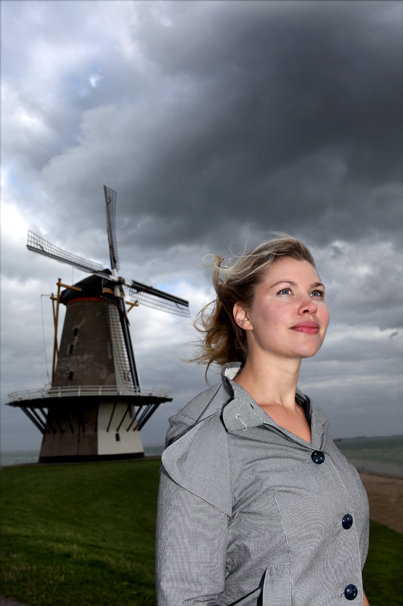
- Born: 23 June 1979 (age 47) near Meliskerke, the Netherlands
- Education: Dutch language, literary science
- Alma mater: Leiden University
- Occupations: Author, journalist
- Writing career
- Genre: Literary fiction
- Subject: Religion
- Notable work: Dorsvloer vol confetti (2009)
- Website: francatreur.nl

Franca Treur (born 1979) is a Dutch writer and a freelance journalist for NRC Handelsblad and nrc.next.

== Biography ==
=== Youth and education ===
Treur grew up in a strict Reformed Christian farming family in her Zeelandic birthplace of Meliskerke. After secondary school at the Calvijn College, she went on to study psychology at Leiden University. Later she switched to Dutch language and literary science. In Leiden, she became a member of the Reformed student association Panoplia. According to a newspaper interview, during her studies she discovered the similarities between stories from Ancient Near Eastern cultures and those related in the Bible, which convinced her that such stories were merely invented to console human beings. Moreover, she says that she had never felt the existence of God, and therefore abandoned her faith, informing the board of Panoplia about it on 11 September 2001.

=== Literary career ===
In 2006, Treur won an essay competition, themed 'Macht en onmacht' ('Power and powerlessness') commissioned by Contrast Magazine and nrc.next, with her piece Maak iets van je leven! Maar wat? ("Make something out of your life! But what?").

In October 2009, her first book Dorsvloer vol confetti ("Threshing Floor Laden With Confetti") was published. It is a psychological novel about a girl that grows up in Zeeland in a deeply religious farming family in the late 1980s and early 1990s. Although her youth served as a crucial role of inspiration, the novel is not an autobiography. The book sold over 150,000 copies. Because of the topic and her background, her style is often compared to writers such as Jan Siebelink and Maarten 't Hart, who, like her, have broken away from the strict Reformed milieu in which they were raised.

In 2010, Franca Treur won the Selexyz Debut Prize. Dorsvloer vol confetti was nominated several times, including for the AKO Literatuurprijs (longlist) and the NS Publieksprijs. At the end of 2010, Column Film announced that it had bought the film rights for Dorsvloer vol confetti. It was shown in cinemas in 2014.

In 2014, she participated in the International Writing Program's Fall Residency at the University of Iowa in Iowa City, IA.

== Works ==
=== Novels ===
- Dorsvloer vol confetti ("Threshing Floor Laden With Confetti"), 2009
- De woongroep ("The Commune"), 2014
- Ik zou maar nergens op rekenen ("I Wouldn't Count on Anything"), Zeelandic boekenweekgeschenk 2015
- X&Y (stories), 2016

=== Essay bundle ===
- Zondig in Zeeland ("Sinful in Zeeland"), 2012, together with Freek de Jonge, Oek de Jong and others.

=== Film adaption ===
- Dorsvloer vol Confetti ("Threshing Floor Laden With Confetti"), 2014
