= De ortolaan =

Novel by Maarten 't Hart

- First edition
- Author: Maarten 't Hart
- Language: Dutch
- Publisher: CPNB
- Publication date: 1984
- Publication place: Netherlands

De ortolaan is a novel by Dutch author Maarten 't Hart. It was first published in 1984.
