= Arie Bijl =

Dutch resistance member and physicist

Arie Bijl (Maassluis, 23 December 1908 – Hamburg-Neuengamme, 2 January 1945) was a Dutch theoretical physicist and resistance man.

Arie Bijl was the youngest child of Simon Bijl (1869–1951), owner of a milk factory, and Willemijntje van der Lelij (1873–1944). Because in the Bijl family there was an eye for the extraordinary gift of Arie and his older brother Jaap (who became a pedagogue), not only the parents, but also the other children in the family contributed financially to the study of the two brothers. Arie Bijl studied mathematics and physics at Leiden University and obtained his PhD there on 28 April 1938 from Hendrik Kramers on the thesis Discontinuities in the energy and specific heat .

After his PhD, he remained affiliated with Leiden University and conducted research on liquid helium, among other things. A publication by him in 1940 led to a wave function developed by him now known as the Bijl-Dingle-Jastrow wave function that is still used. Also the Bijl-Feynman spectrum and the Bijl-Jastrow factor are named after him.

In the crisis years Arie Bijl was a member of a group of scientists around the future Nobel laureate Jan Tinbergen. The reason was that Tinbergen wanted to apply physical principles to economic problems. Bijl corresponded about economics with Albert Einstein and wrote the book Werkgelegenheidspolitiek: ordening in een vrije economie (Employment politics: order in a free economy) that was posthumously published by De Arbeiderspers in 1953 with a foreword by Tinbergen.

In the Second World War he kept persecuted fellow physicists from Eastern Europe, including the Polish Jew Julius Podolanski (1905–1955), hidden in his windmill "De Kameraad" in Nederhorst den Berg. This mill burned down due to carelessness by one of the people in hiding. On 7 January 1944, he married in Oegstgeest with Agnes Beket. In the same year, the Germans discovered him because a member of the resistance had a list of names with him during a check. Arie Bijl was transferred via Scheveningen to Amersfoort concentration camp and from there to the Neuengamme concentration camp near Hamburg where he arrived on 14 October 1944. Due to the extremely poor conditions in the camp, he died after just over two months, according to the camp administration to a gastrointestinal catarrh.

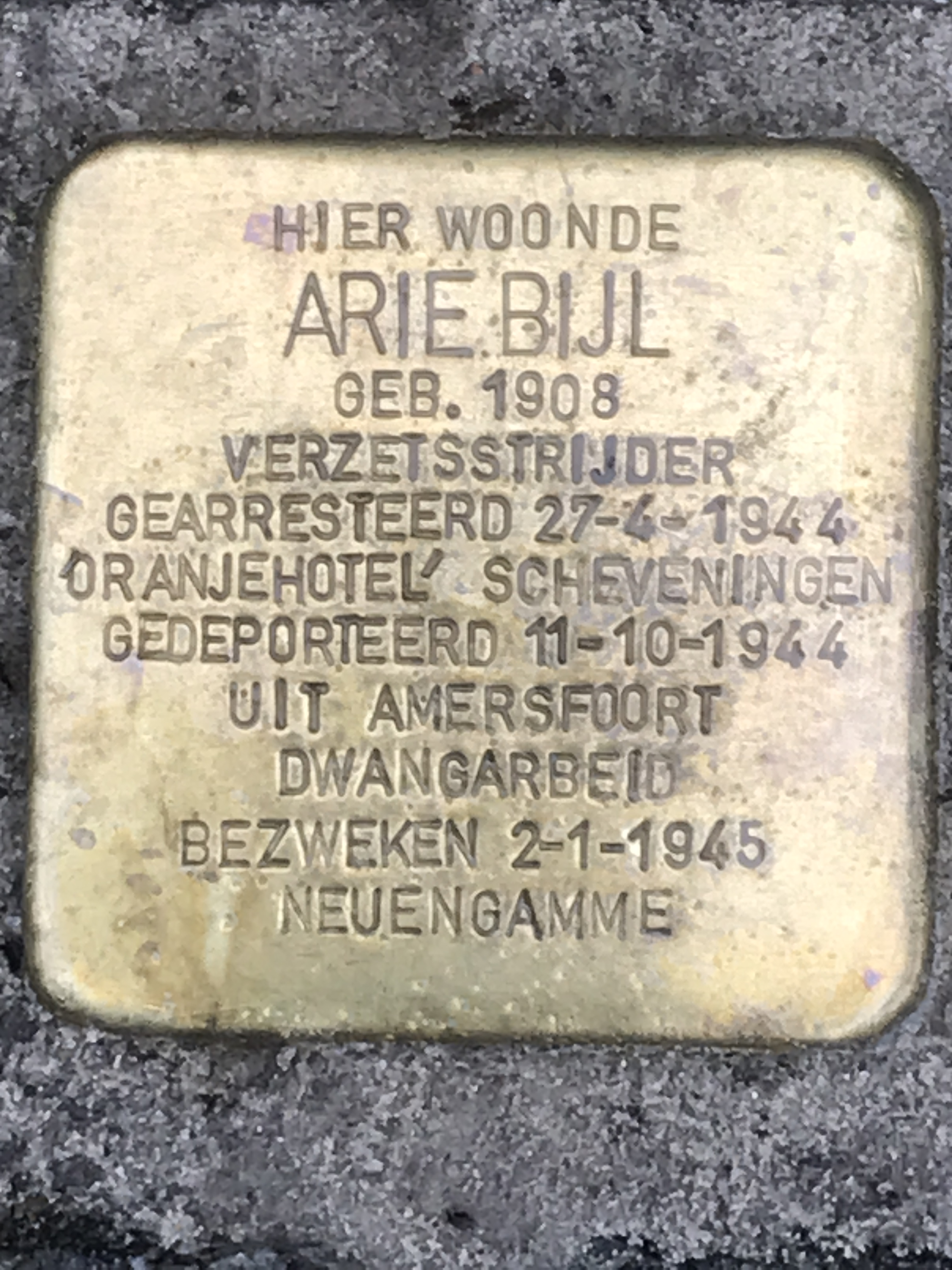
Stolperstein in front of the home of Arie Bijl, Emmalaan 32 in Oegstgeest

== Trivia ==
In Oegstgeest a street was named after him, the Arie Bijlhof.
