= Koen Pijpers =

Dutch field hockey player (born 1969)

Koen Pijpers (Dutch pronunciation: [kum ˈpɛipɛrs]; born 30 May 1969 in Maassluis) is a Dutch retired field hockey player who represented the Dutch national team.
