= Meliskerke =

- Village
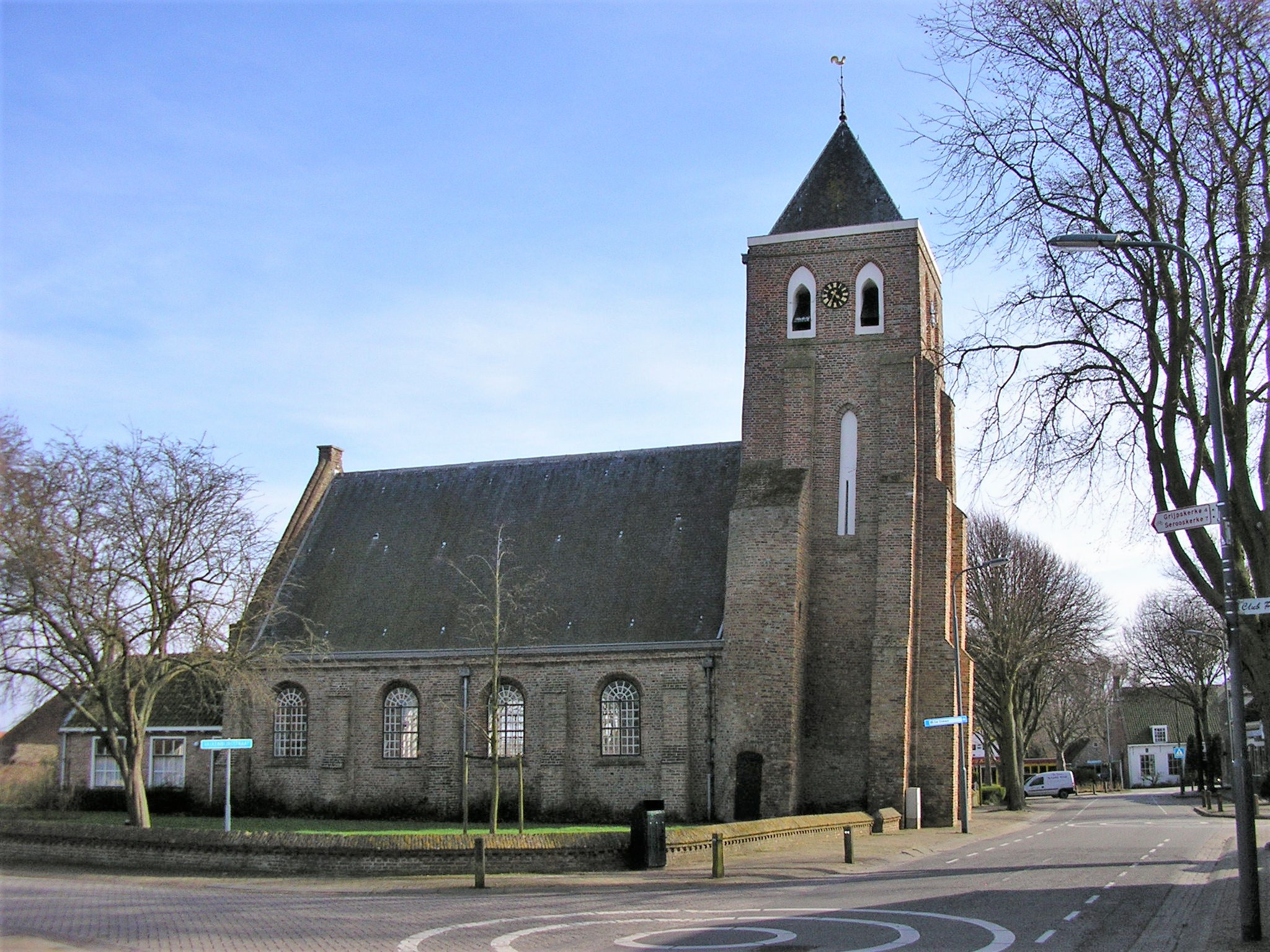
- Protestant parish church of St. Odulphus

- Coat of arms

- Location in the province of Zeeland in the Netherlands Meliskerke (Netherlands)
- Coordinates: 51°30′55″N 3°30′43″E
- Country: Netherlands
- Province: Zeeland
- Municipality: Veere

Area
  - Total: 8.08 km^{2} (3.12 sq mi)
- Elevation: 0.9 m (3.0 ft)

Population (2021)
  - Total: 1,470
  - Density: 182/km^{2} (471/sq mi)
- Time zone: UTC+1 (CET)
  - Summer (DST): UTC+2 (CEST)
- Postal code: 4365
- Dialing code: 0118

Meliskerke is a village in the Dutch province of Zeeland. It is a part of the municipality of Veere, and lies about 8 km west of Middelburg.

== History ==
The village was first mentioned in 1235 as "Hughenkerke que modo Meliskercke dicitur", and means "(private) church of Meinlof (person)". Meliskerke is an incomplete circular church village which developed in the 12th century on a ridge.

The Dutch Reformed church is a single-aisled church. The tower dates from around 1400. The church was modified and partially rebuilt after damage between 1572 and 1574. The tower is leaning slightly and has a displacement of 60 centimetres.

The grist mill Meliskerke Molen was built in 1801. It was in use until 1954. In 1987, it was bought by the municipality and restored. It is usually in operation on Saturdays.

Meliskerke was home to 307 people in 1840. Meliskerke was damaged during the inundation of 1944.

Meliskerke was a separate municipality until 1966, when it was merged into the new municipality of Mariekerke. In 1997, it became part of the municipality of Veere.

== Politics ==
It is a conservative Protestant village, located on the Dutch Bible Belt. In the 2010 municipal elections, 63 percent of the local population voted for the Reformed Political Party (SGP). The three Christian parties in the elections (the Reformed Political Party, the ChristianUnion and the Christian Democratic Appeal) had a combined total of almost 70 percent of the votes.

== Notable people ==
Fiction writer Franca Treur was born in Meliskerke.

== Gallery ==
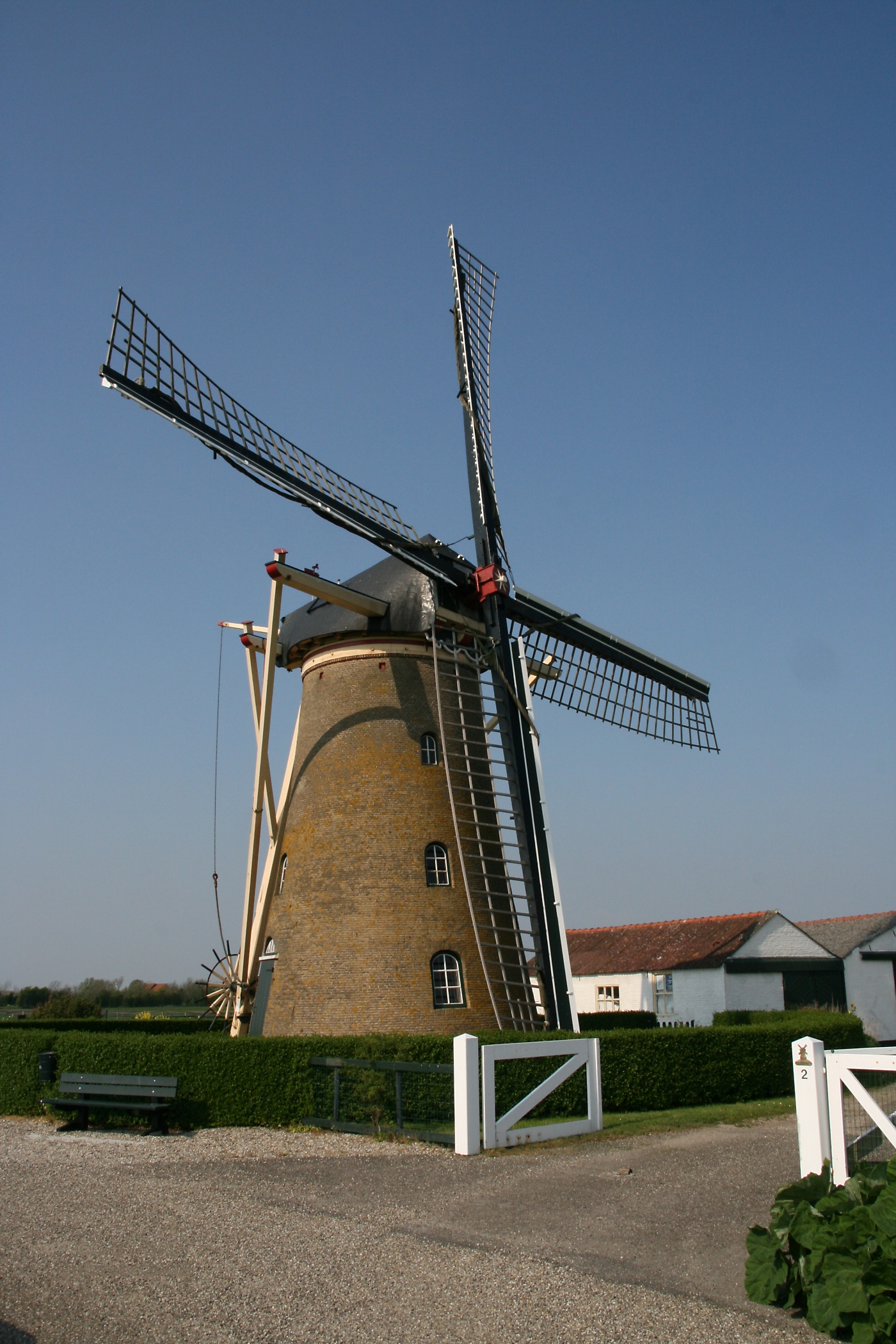
Windmill Meliskerke Molen

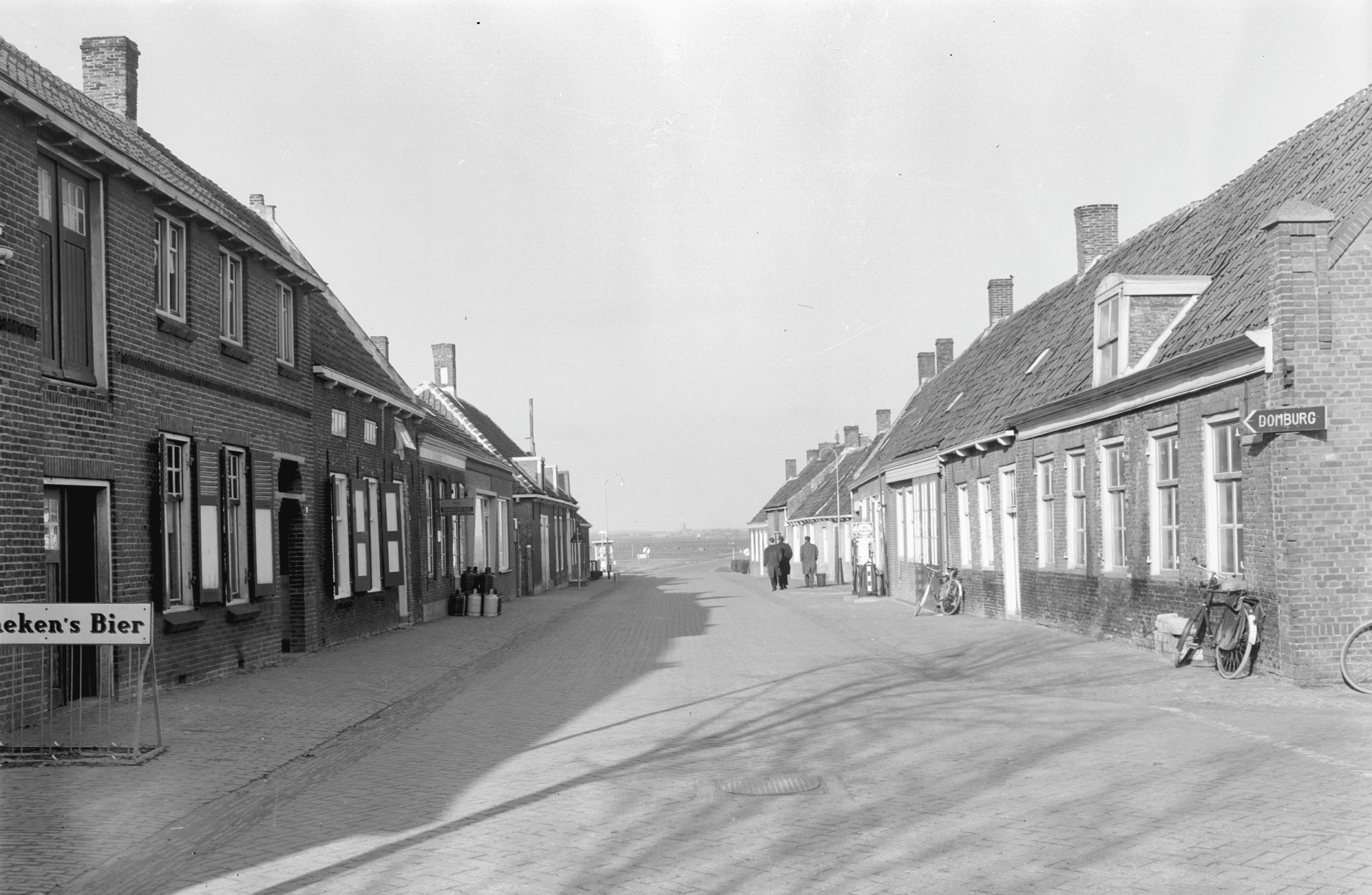
Street view (1964)

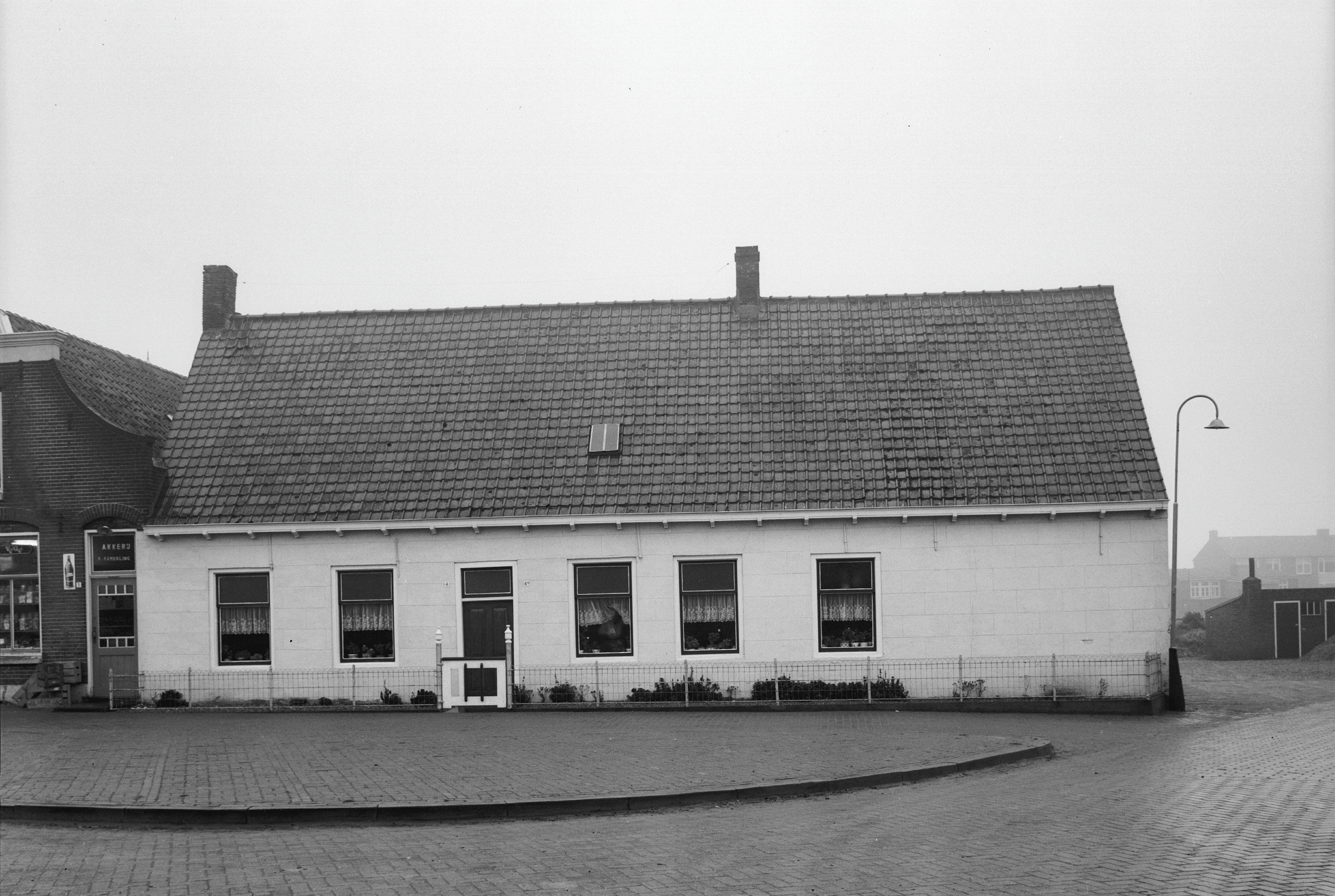
House in Meliskerke
