= Jan Siebelink =

Dutch writer

Jan Geurt Siebelink
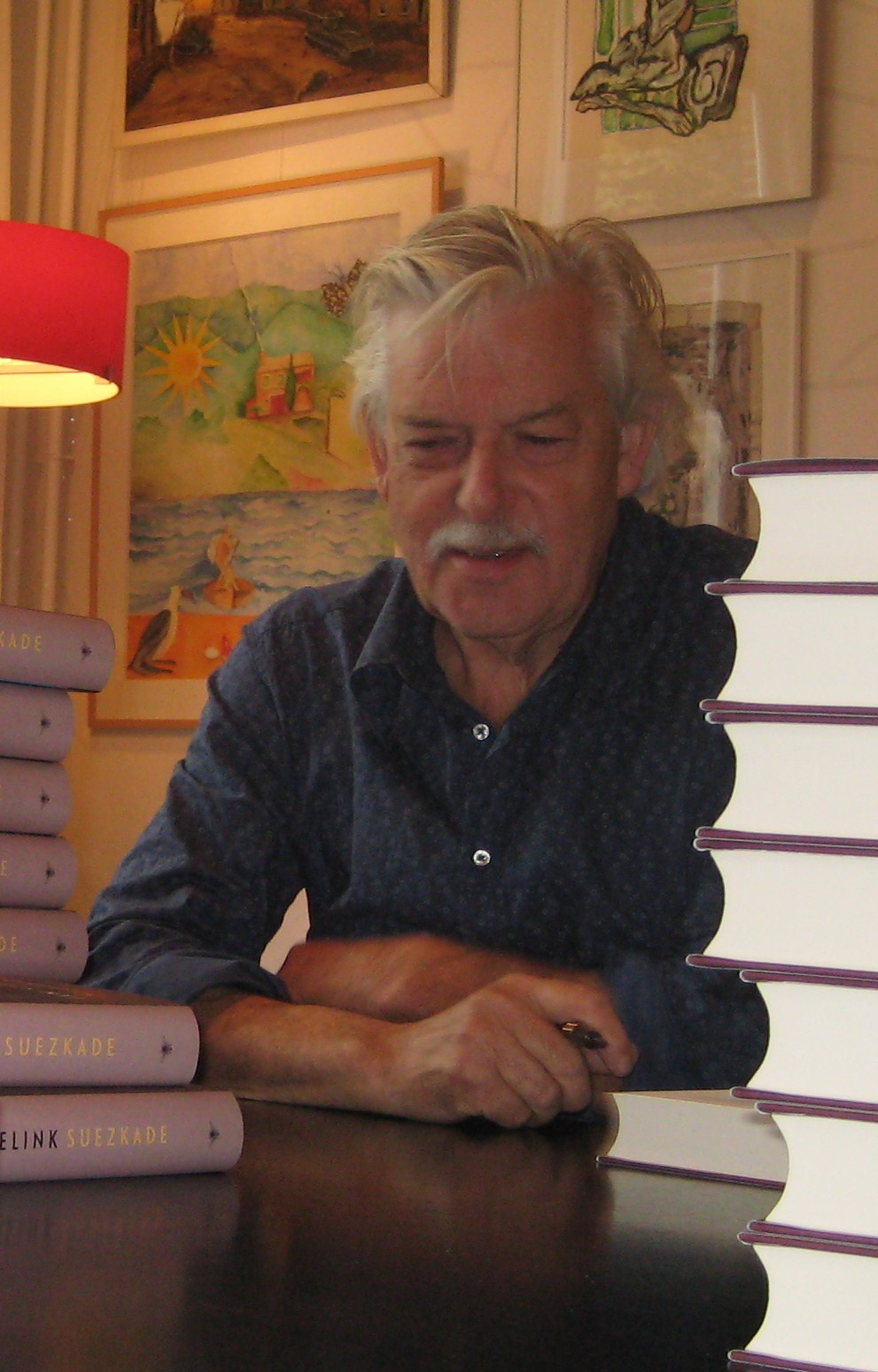
- Born: 13 February 1938 (age 88); Velp, Netherlands
- Occupation: Author
- Website: www.jansiebelink.nl

Jan Geurt Siebelink (born 13 February 1938 in Velp, Gelderland) is a Dutch author. In 2005, he wrote the novel Knielen op een bed violen (literally Kneeling on a Bed of Violets, translated into English as In my father's garden) that sold over 700,000 copies. In 1991, he won the Ferdinand Bordewijk Prijs for De overkant van de rivier.

== Bibliography ==
Selected works:

- Nachtschade (1975). Peter Loeb.
- Een lust voor het oog (1977). Athenaeum/Loeb.
- J.K. Huysmans, Tegen de keer (1977)
- Weerloos (1978)
- Oponthoud (1979)
- De herfst zal schitterend zijn (1980)
- De reptielse geest (1981)
- En joeg de vossen door het staande koren (1982)
- Arnhem. Beeld en verbeelding (1983)
- Koning Cophetua en het bedelmeisje (1983)
- De hof van onrust (1984)
- De prins van nachtelijk Parijs (1985)
- Ereprijs (1986)
- Met afgewend hoofd (1986)
- Schaduwen in de middag (1987)
- De overkant van de rivier (1990)
- Hartje zomer en andere verhalen (1991)
- Pijn is genot (1992)
- Met een half oog (1992)
- Verdwaald gezin (1993)
- Laatste schooldag (1994)
- Dorpsstraat Ons Dorp (1995)
- Vera (1997)
- Daar gaat de zon nooit onder (1998)
- Schuldige hond (1998)
- De bloemen van Oscar Kristelijn (1998)
- Bergweg 17, Bosweg 19 (1999)
- Mijn leven met Tikker (1999)
- Engelen van het duister (2001)
- Margaretha (2002)
- Knielen op een bed violen (2005)
- De kwekerij (2007)
- Suezkade (2008)
- Het lichaam van Clara (2011)
- Oscar (2012)
- Daniël in de vallei (2013)
- De blauwe nacht (2014)
- Margje (2015)
- De buurjongen (2017). De Bezige Bij. ISBN 9789023468301.
- Jas van belofte (2019). Stichting CPNB. ISBN 9789059654679.

== See also ==
- Franca Treur
- Maarten 't Hart
