= Maarten 't Hart =

Dutch writer (born 1944)

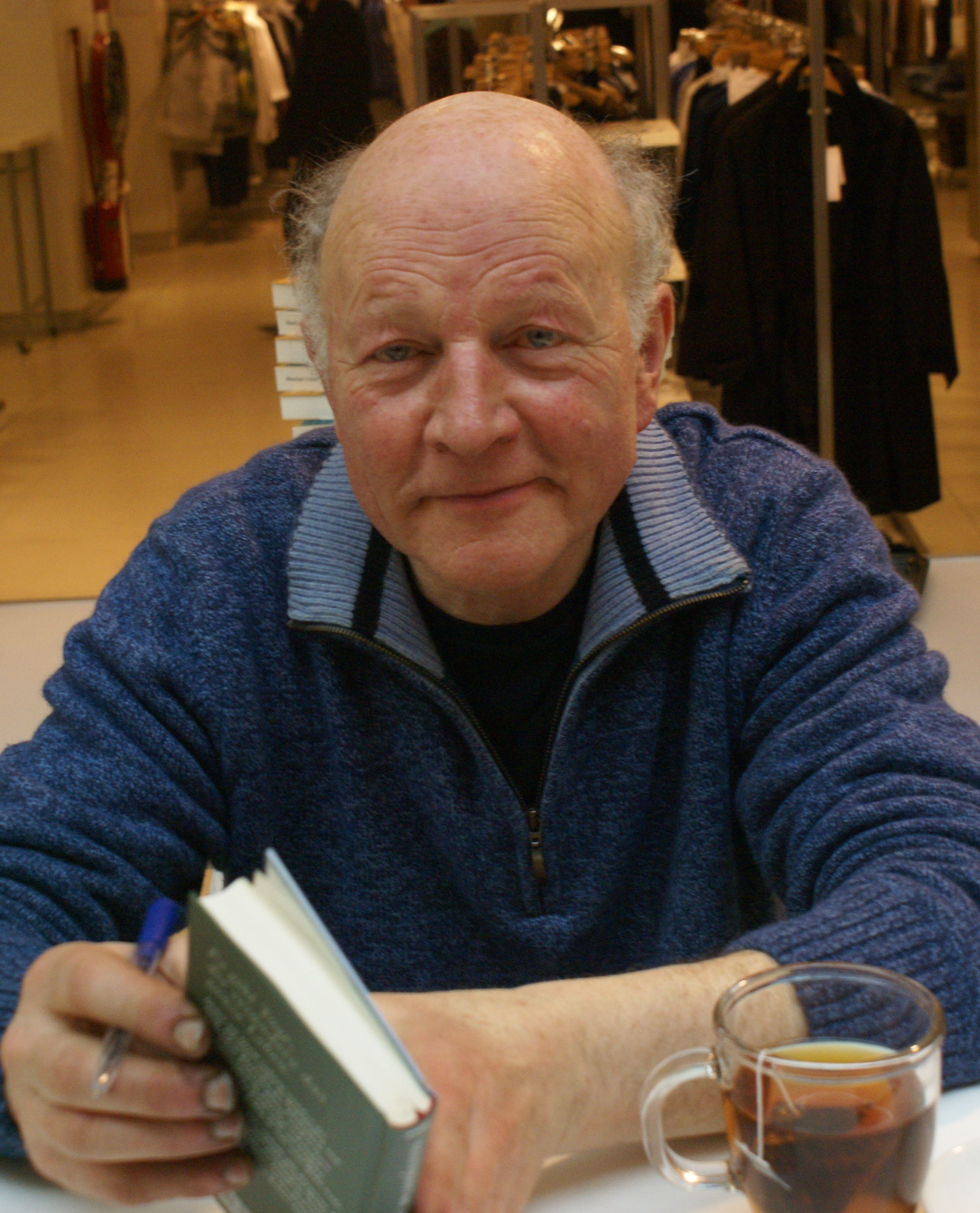
- Maarten 't Hart in 2011
- Born: Maarten 't Hart; 25 November 1944 (age 81); Maassluis, Netherlands
- Education: Leiden University
- Occupations: Writer, biologist
- Writing career
- Pen name: Martin Hart
- Language: Dutch
- Website: www.maartenthart.nl

Maarten 't Hart (born 25 November 1944 in Maassluis) is a Dutch writer. Trained as a biologist in zoology and ethology at the Leiden University, he taught that subject before becoming a full-time writer in the 1980s, having made his debut as a novelist in 1971 under the name Martin Hart with Stenen voor een ransuil ("Stones for a Long-Eared Owl").

He is the author of many novels, including Het Woeden der Gehele Wereld and De kroongetuige. His books have been translated into a number of European languages. Three of his novels, Een vlucht regenwulpen (A Flight of Curlews, trans. 1986), De aansprekers (Bearers of Bad Tidings, trans. 1983), and De zonnewijzer (The Sundial, trans. 2004) have appeared in English, as have a few of his short stories.

't Hart has also written non-fiction, including Ratten (1973), published in an English translation as Rats by Arnold Pomerans (London/New York: Allison and Busby, 1982). He was "rat consultant" to Werner Herzog for the film Nosferatu the Vampyre (1979); he disagreed with Herzog's treatment of the rats and later wrote a story, "Ongewenste zeereis", that appeared in 2004 in Granta under the title "Rats".

== Selected bibliography ==
- (1971) Stenen voor een ransuil
- (1973) Ratten; English translation: Rats (1982)
- (1973) Ik had een wapenbroeder
- (1974) Het vrome volk
- (1978) Een vlucht regenwulpen; English translation: Flight of Curlews (1986)
- (1979) De aansprekers; English translation: Bearers of Bad Tidings (1984)
- (1980) De droomkoningin
- (1983) De kroongetuige
- (1984) De ortolaan
- (1986) De jacobsladder
- (1987) Het uur tussen hond en wolf
- (1988) De steile helling
- (1991) Onder de korenmaat
- (1993) Het woeden der gehele wereld
- (1996) De nakomer
- (2002) De zonnewijzer; English translation: The Sundial (2004)
- (2004) Lotte Weeda
- (2006) Het psalmenoproer
- (2019) De nachtstemmer

== See also ==
- Franca Treur
- Jan Siebelink
