= Boy with a Spinning-Top =

1738 painting by Jean Siméon Chardin

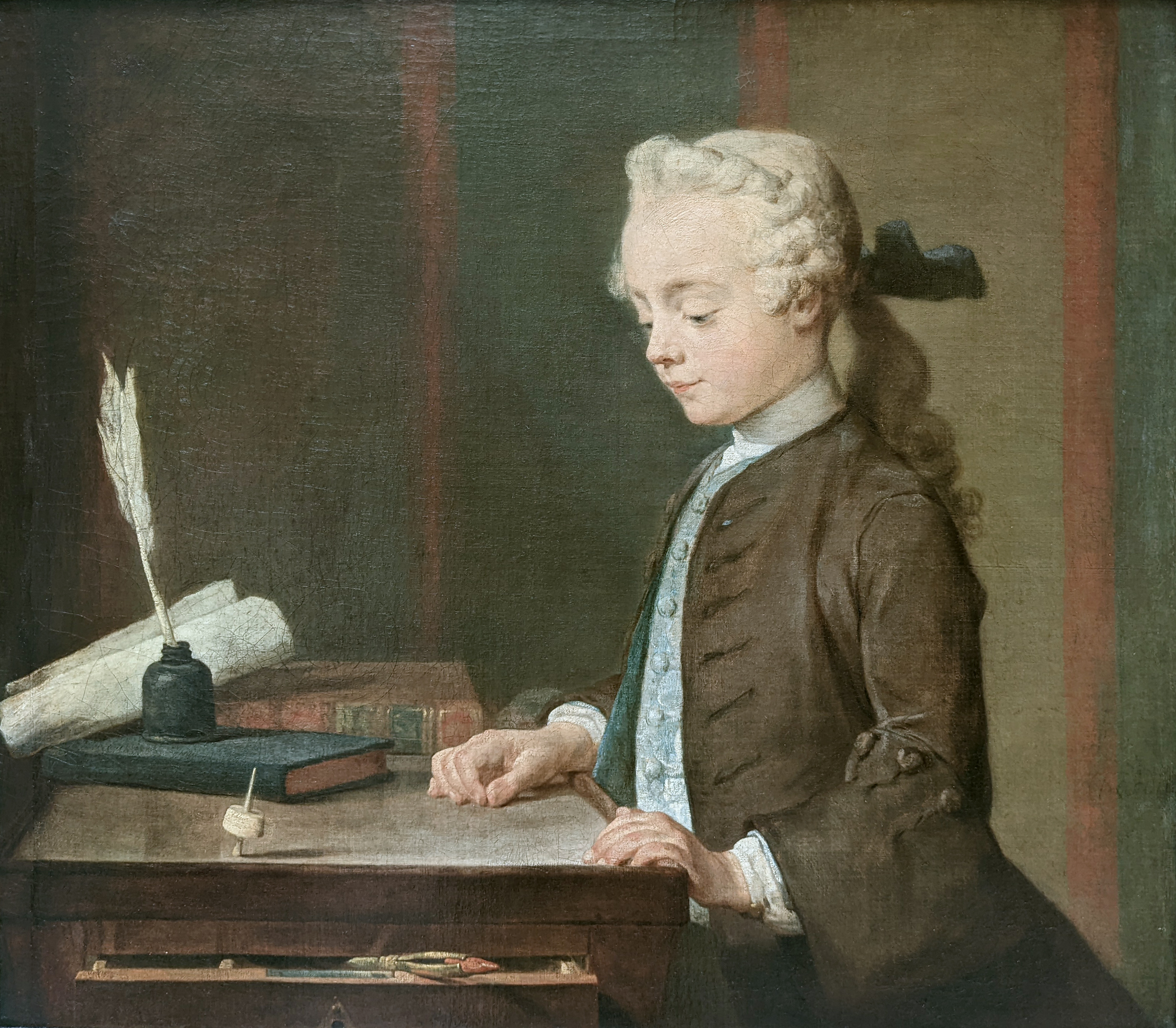
- Artist: Jean Siméon Chardin
- Year: 1738
- Dimensions: 67 cm × 76 cm (26 in × 30 in)
- Location: Louvre

Boy with a Spinning-Top or Child with a Teetotum is a 1738 oil-on-canvas painting by the French artist Jean Siméon Chardin, now in the Louvre in Paris, which acquired it in 1907.

It is based on a 1735 work now in the São Paulo Museum of Art and shows Auguste-Gabriel, son of the jeweller Charles Godefroy, contemplating a teetotum or spinning top. The painting is in line with Age of Enlightenment ideas on childhood and play, especially those of Jean-Jacques Rousseau. On the table in the background are an inkwell, a pen and books, whilst a drawer in the table is open to show a porte-crayon.
