= Mariekerke, Netherlands =

Coordinates: 51°31′N 3°32′E

Mariekerke is a former municipality in the Dutch province of Zeeland. The municipality was formed in a merger of Aagtekerke, Grijpskerke and Meliskerke in 1966, and existed until 1997 when it merged into the municipality of Veere.

The municipality was named after the former village of Mariekerke, which is now a hamlet named Klein Mariekerke.
