= Maassluis =

- Town and municipality
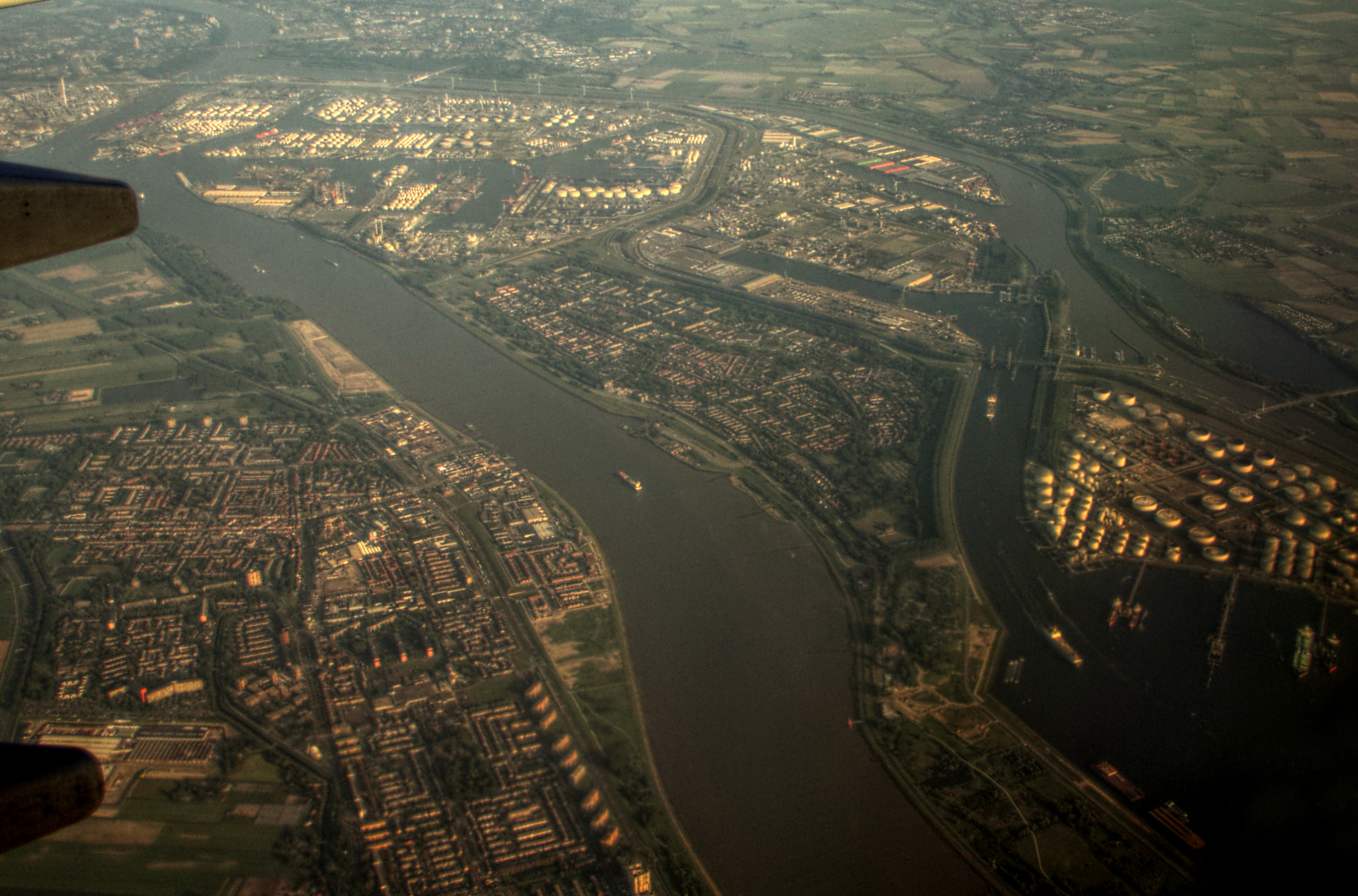
- Aerial view of Maassluis

- Flag Coat of arms

- Location in South Holland
- Coordinates: 51°56′N 4°14′E
- Country: Netherlands
- Province: South Holland

Government
  - Body: Municipal council
  - Mayor: Jack de Vries (CDA)

Area
  - Total: 10.12 km^{2} (3.91 sq mi)
  - Land: 8.48 km^{2} (3.27 sq mi)
  - Water: 1.64 km^{2} (0.63 sq mi)
- Elevation: 4 m (13 ft)

Population (January 2021)
  - Total: 33,567
  - Density: 3,958/km^{2} (10,250/sq mi)
- Demonym: Maassluizer
- Time zone: UTC+1 (CET)
  - Summer (DST): UTC+2 (CEST)
- Postcode: 3140–3147
- Area code: 010
- Website: www.maassluis.nl

Maassluis (Dutch pronunciation: [maˑˈslʌy̆s]) is a town in the western Netherlands, in the province of South Holland. The municipality had a population of 33,567 in 2021 and covered 10.12 km^{2} (3.91 sq mi) of which 1.64 km^{2} (0.63 sq mi) was water.

It received town rights in 1811.

== History ==
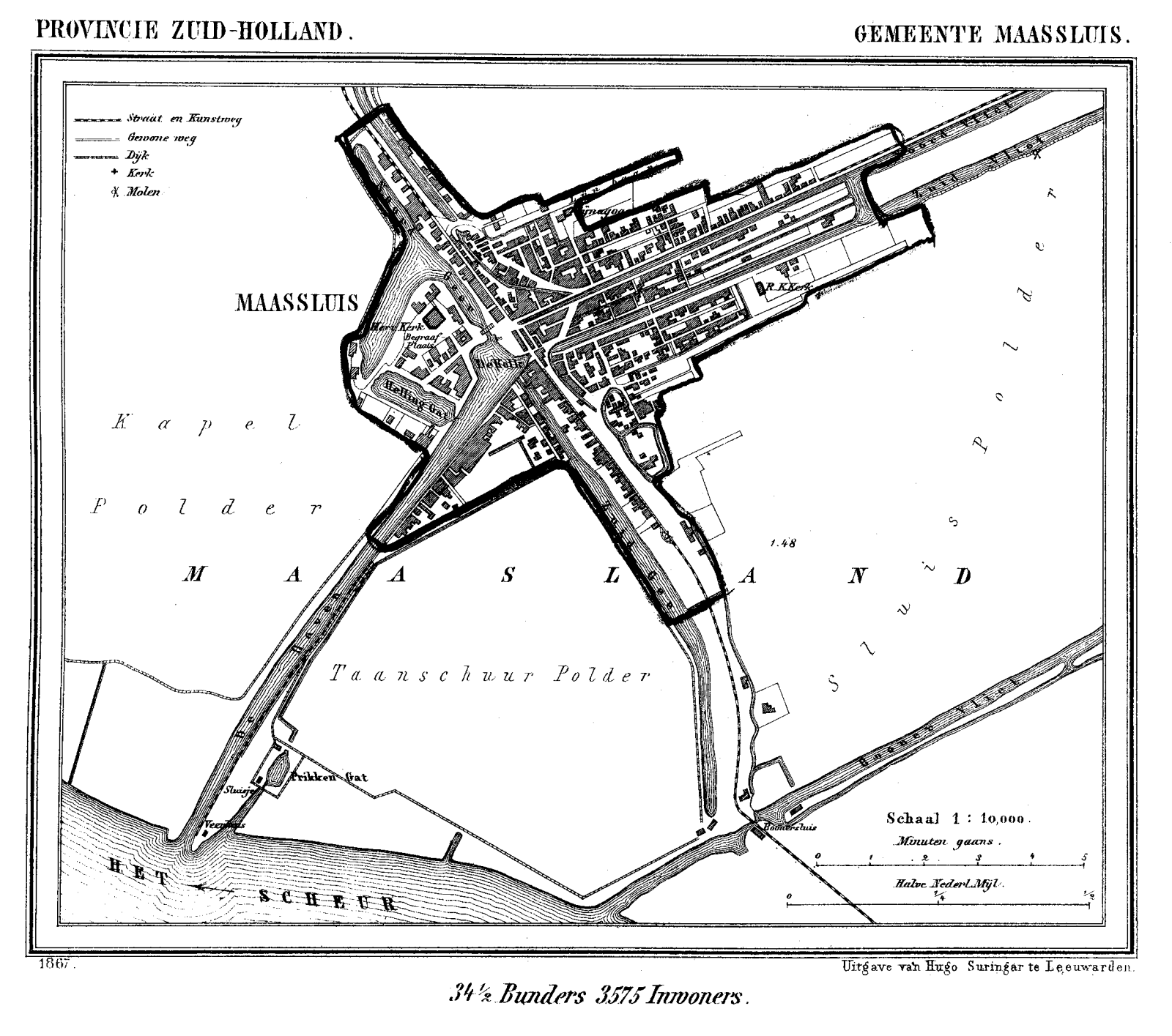
Maassluis in 1867

Maassluis was founded circa 1340 as a settlement next to a lock (in Dutch: sluis) in the sea barrier between the North Sea and Rotterdam. Originally Maeslandsluys, it was part of Maesland. In 1489 the settlement was sacked. During the Eighty Years' War, Philips of Marnix, lord of Sint-Aldegonde, started to build a defense wall but before its completion, the Spanish captured it in 1573 and Philips of Marnix was taken prisoner. A year later Maeslandsluys was looted by mutinous Spanish troops.

On 16 May 1614, Maeslandsluys was separated from Maesland by the counts of Holland and renamed Maassluis. This separation may have been religiously motivated: Maassluis was predominantly Protestant and Maasland Catholic. In 1624 the defense wall was demolished to make way for the Great Church, started in 1629. Construction stopped for five years because privateers from Dunkirk raided fishing boats from Maassluis, throwing their crew overboard. It was finished in 1639. On 4 December 1732, the Garrels Organ was inaugurated. Built from 1730 to 1732 by Rudolf Garrels, a pupil of Arp Schnitger, it was a gift by Govert van Wijn, ship-owner from Maassluis.

In 1811, Napoleon Bonaparte granted town rights.

During World War II, the working population was transferred to Germany for the war industry. Maassluis' ancient church was hit by allied bombers.

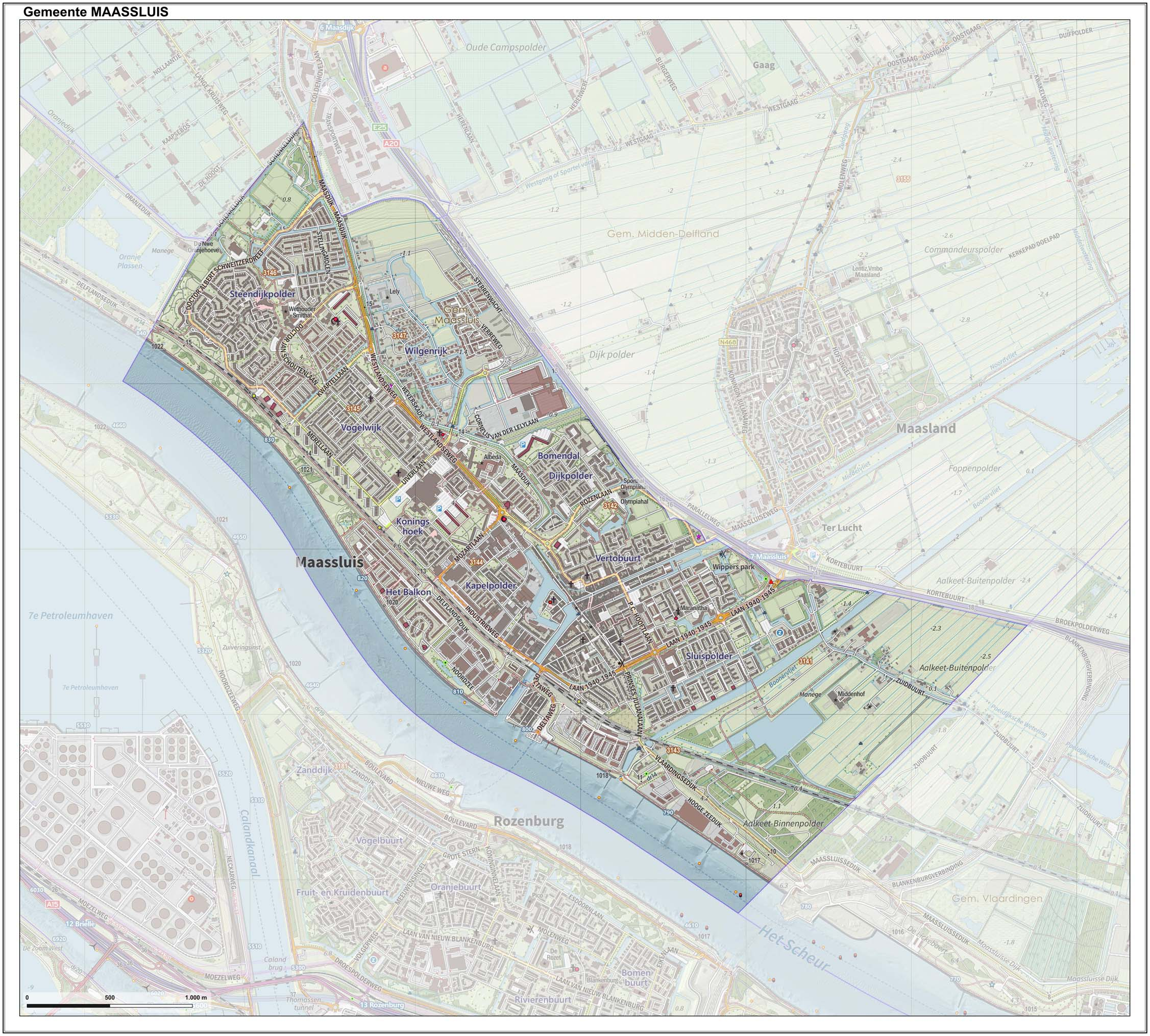
Topographic map of Maassluis, June 2015

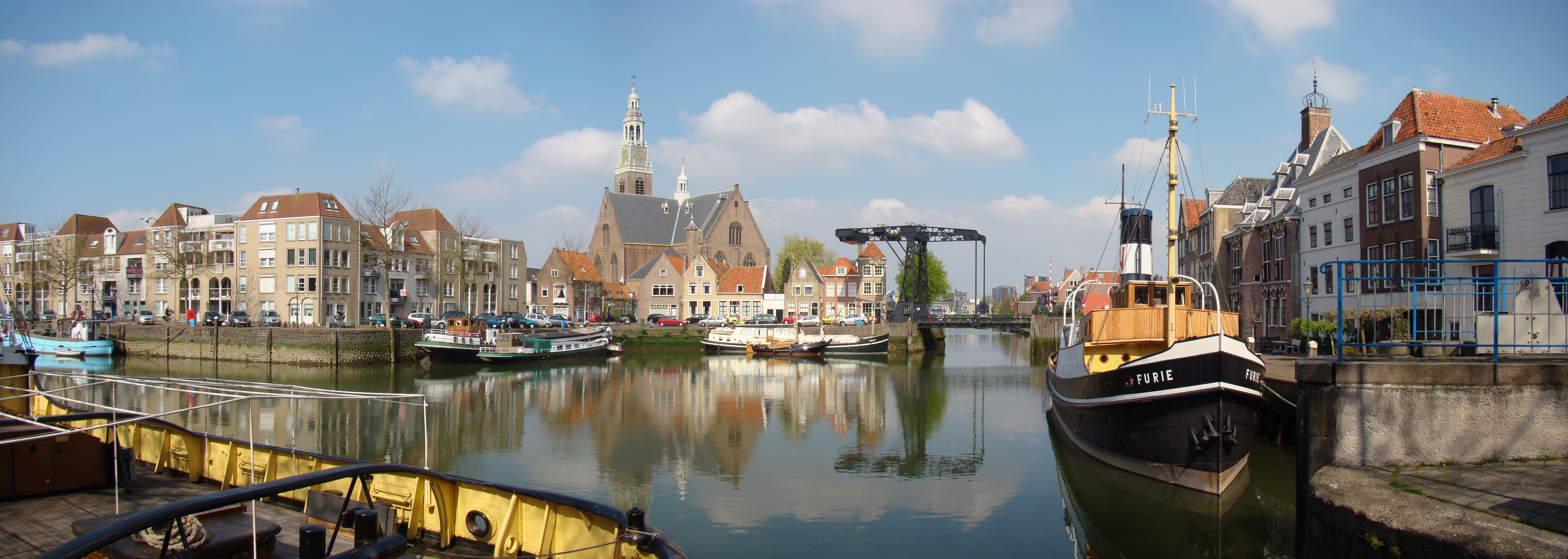
Church: de Grote Kerk

=== Jewish history ===
The Jewish community had its own synagogue, a teacher, a singer and a ritual butcher. Its most common professions were salesman, street trader and butcher. The economy was vulnerable and community growth ended with the industrial revolution. The area became easier to reach and competition became too much. The number of Jews fell from 92 to eight between 1892 and 1930. A cause was the building of a railway in 1881 between Maassluis and Rotterdam. Most Jewish traders moved to Rotterdam, The Hague and Amsterdam, which in the last decade of the 19th century had a growing Jewish population.

Integration in Maassluis ended during the Second World War. The Coltof and Van Gelderen families were deported in 1942 and murdered in Auschwitz.

== Economy ==
Maassluis was historically dependent on the fishing near the coast and off Iceland. In the 19th century the tugboat company, L. Smit, and the marine salvage company W.A. van den Tak merged to become Smit-Tak, now a division of the world's largest salvage company, Smit International. Also, there is still a large shipping agency called Royal Dirkzwager. Maassluis is now mainly a commuter town for Rotterdam.

== People born in Maassluis ==
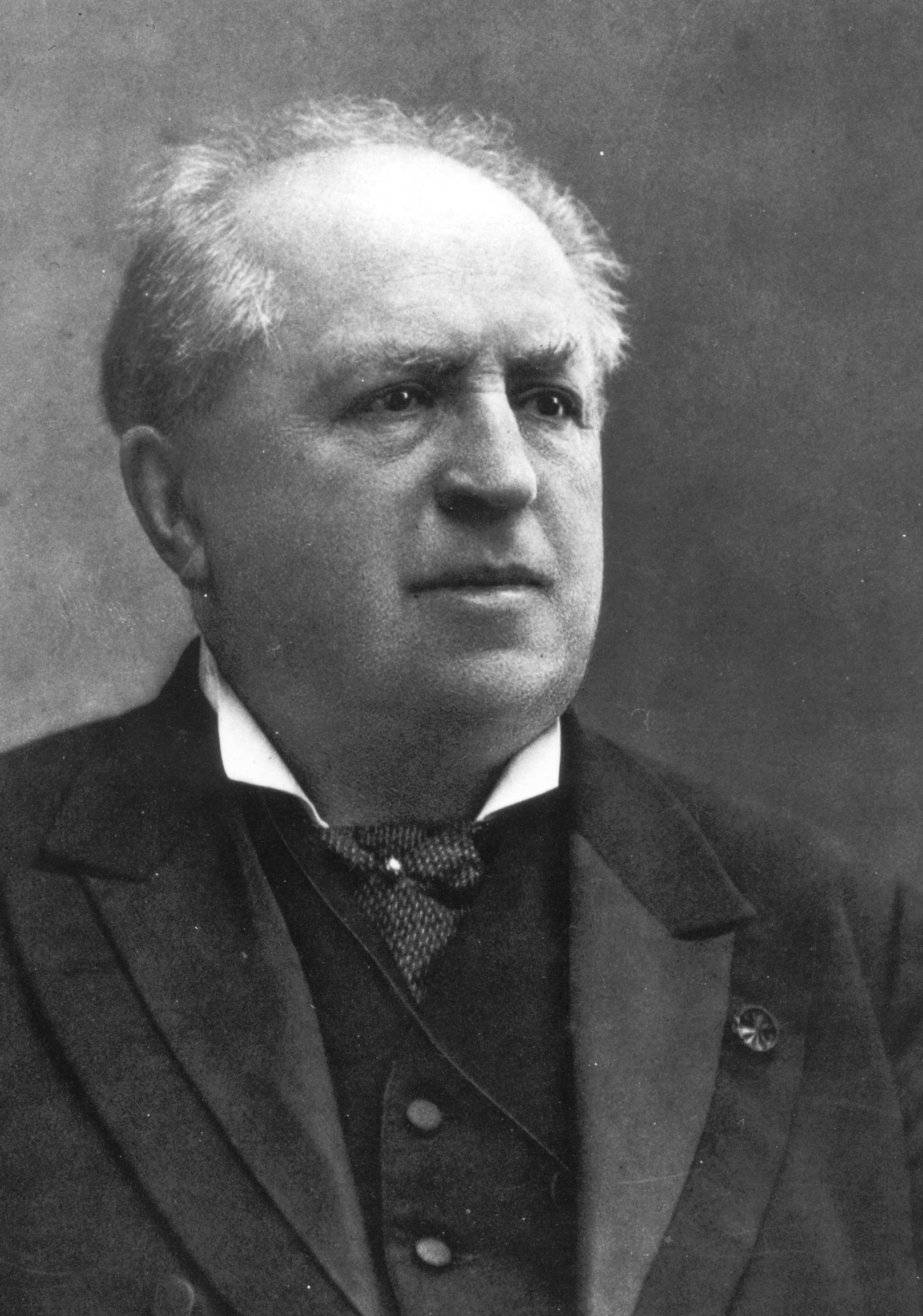
Abraham Kuyper, 1905

- Bartholomeus Meyburgh (1624-1708), a Dutch Golden Age painter of portraits and history
- Abraham Kuyper (1837-1920), journalist, theologian & Prime Minister of the Netherlands 1901/1905
- Louis Fles (1872-1940), businessman, activist and author
- Cornelis Lievense (1890-1949), businessman, president of the Union Banking Corporation
- Arie Bijl (1908–1945), a Dutch theoretical physicist and WWII resistance man
- Maarten 't Hart (born 1944), biologist and writer
- Agnes van Ardenne (born 1950), a retired Dutch politician and diplomat
- Niko Koffeman (born 1958), a Dutch politician and animal rights activist
- Chris Woerts (born 1959), former journalist, businessman interested in sport

=== Sport ===
- Jan Verhaas (born 1966), a Dutch snooker and pool referee
- Koen Pijpers (born 1969), a Dutch retired field hockey player
- Françoise Harteveld (born 1977), a Dutch judoka
- Khalid Boulahrouz (born 1981), a Dutch former footballer with 235 club caps
- Tonny Trindade de Vilhena (born 1995), footballer with over 200 club caps

== In media ==
Maassluis was the setting for Spetters, filmed by director Paul Verhoeven in 1980.

== Image gallery ==
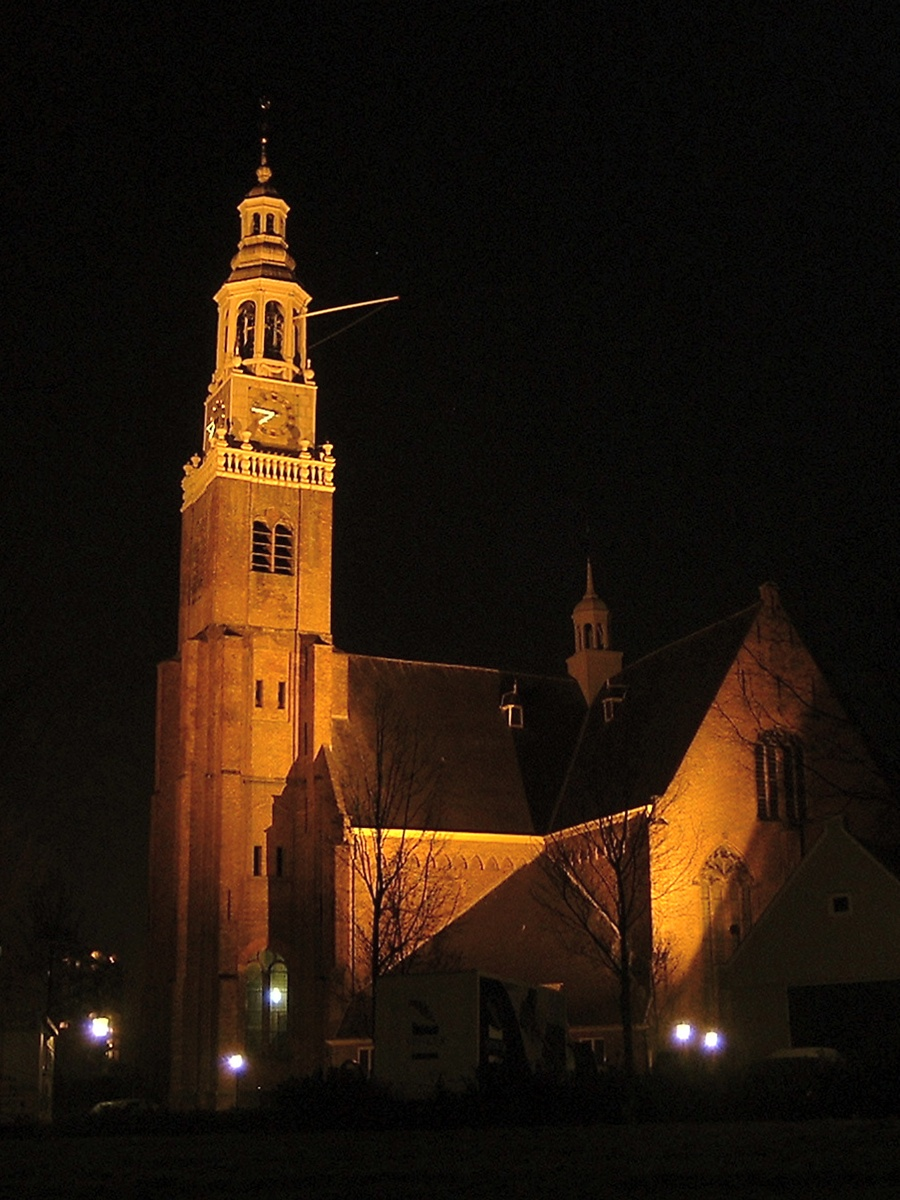
Great Church of Maassluis

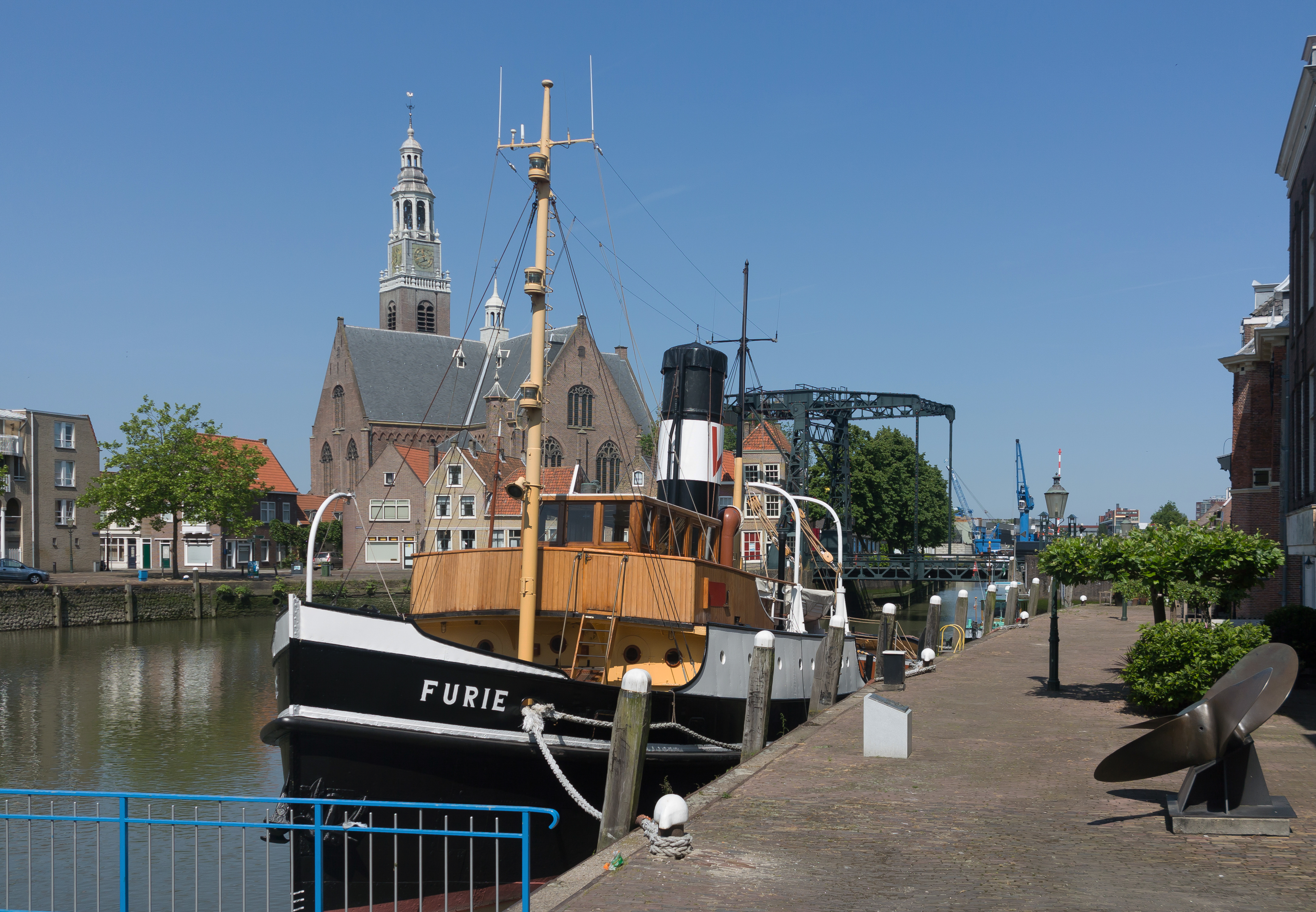
Tugboat (de Furie) with church (de Groote Kerk)

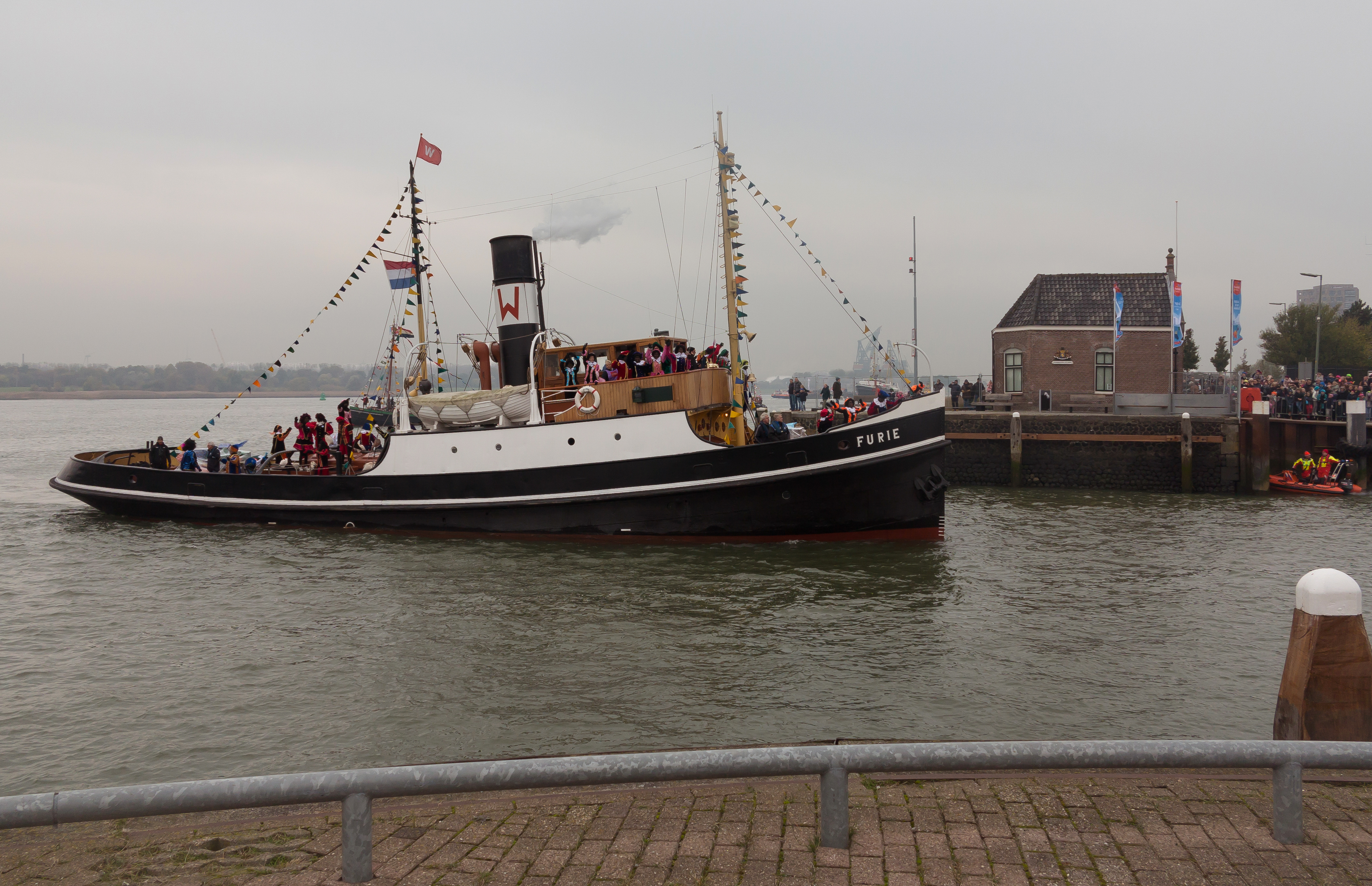
Ship: De Furie during national arrival of Sinterklaas in Maassluis

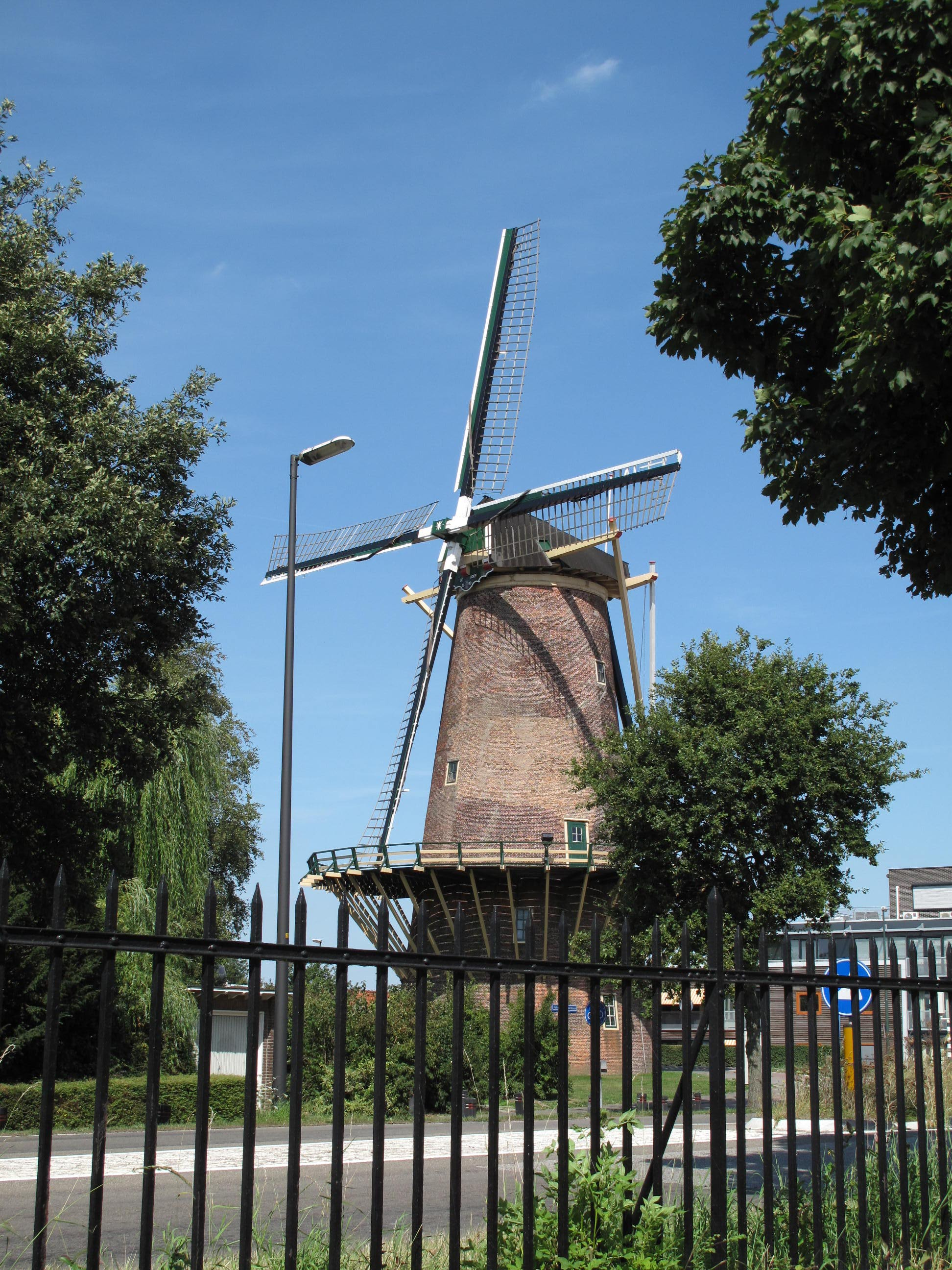
Windmill: de Hoop

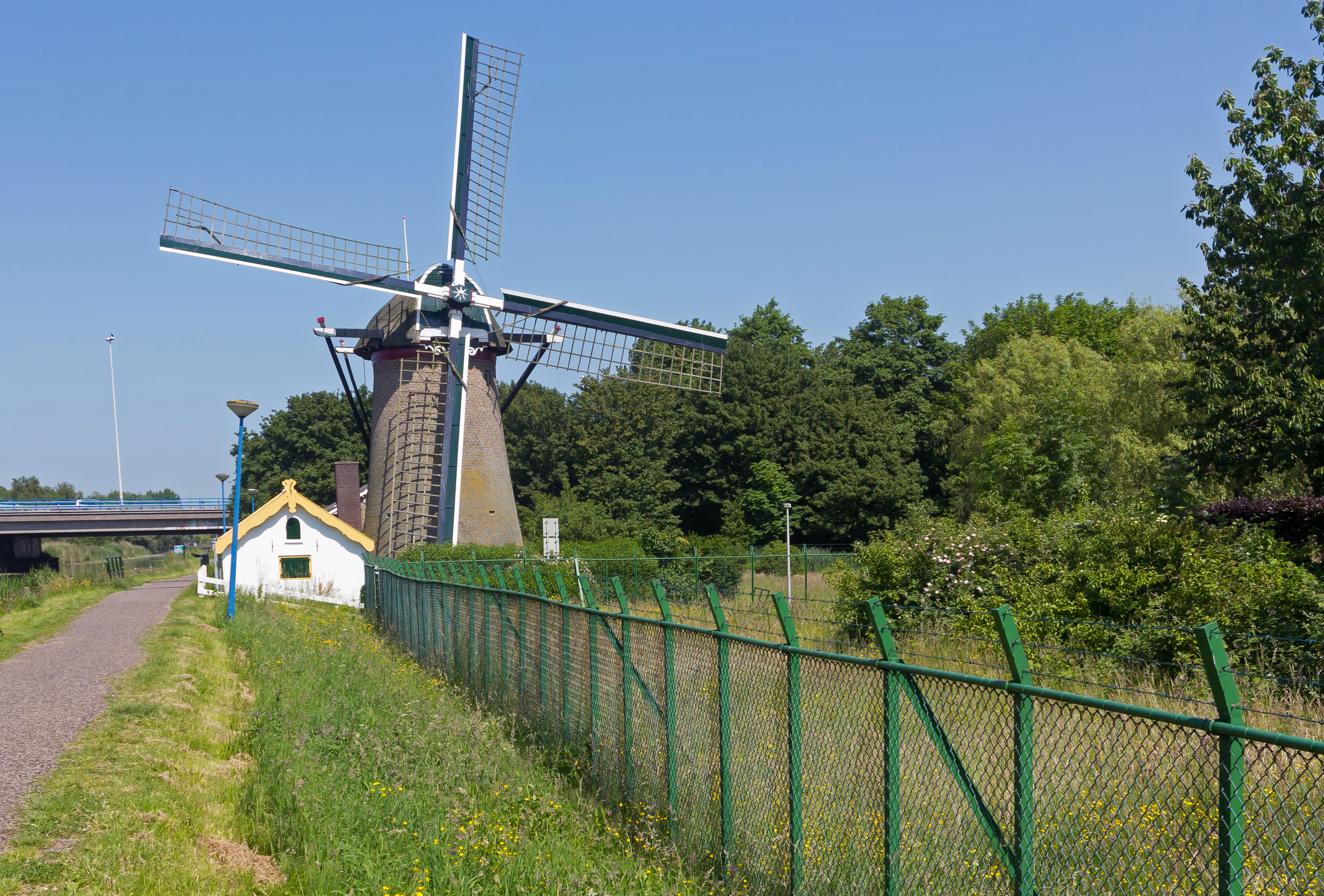
Windmill: de Wippersmolen

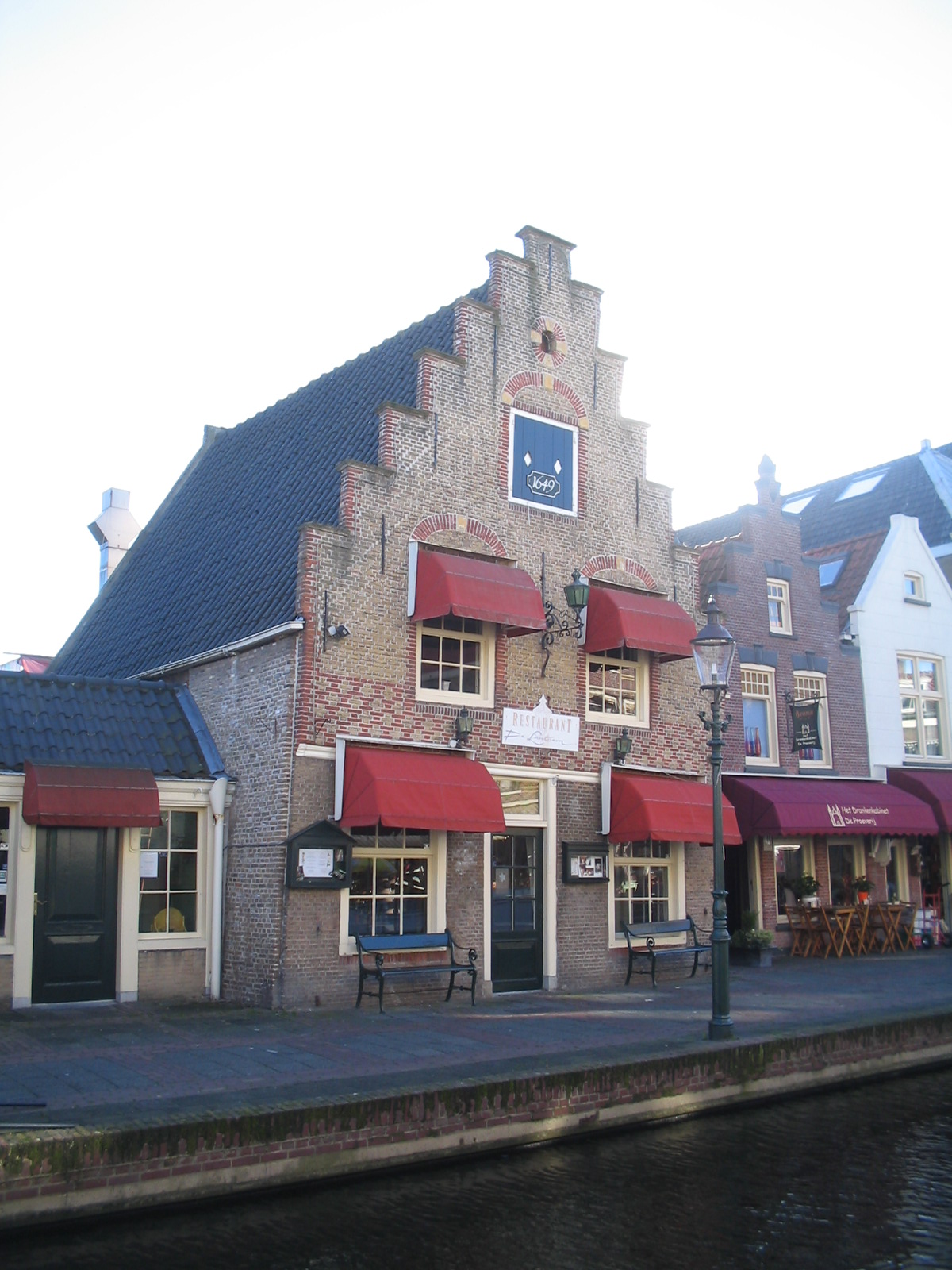
Historic building from 1649

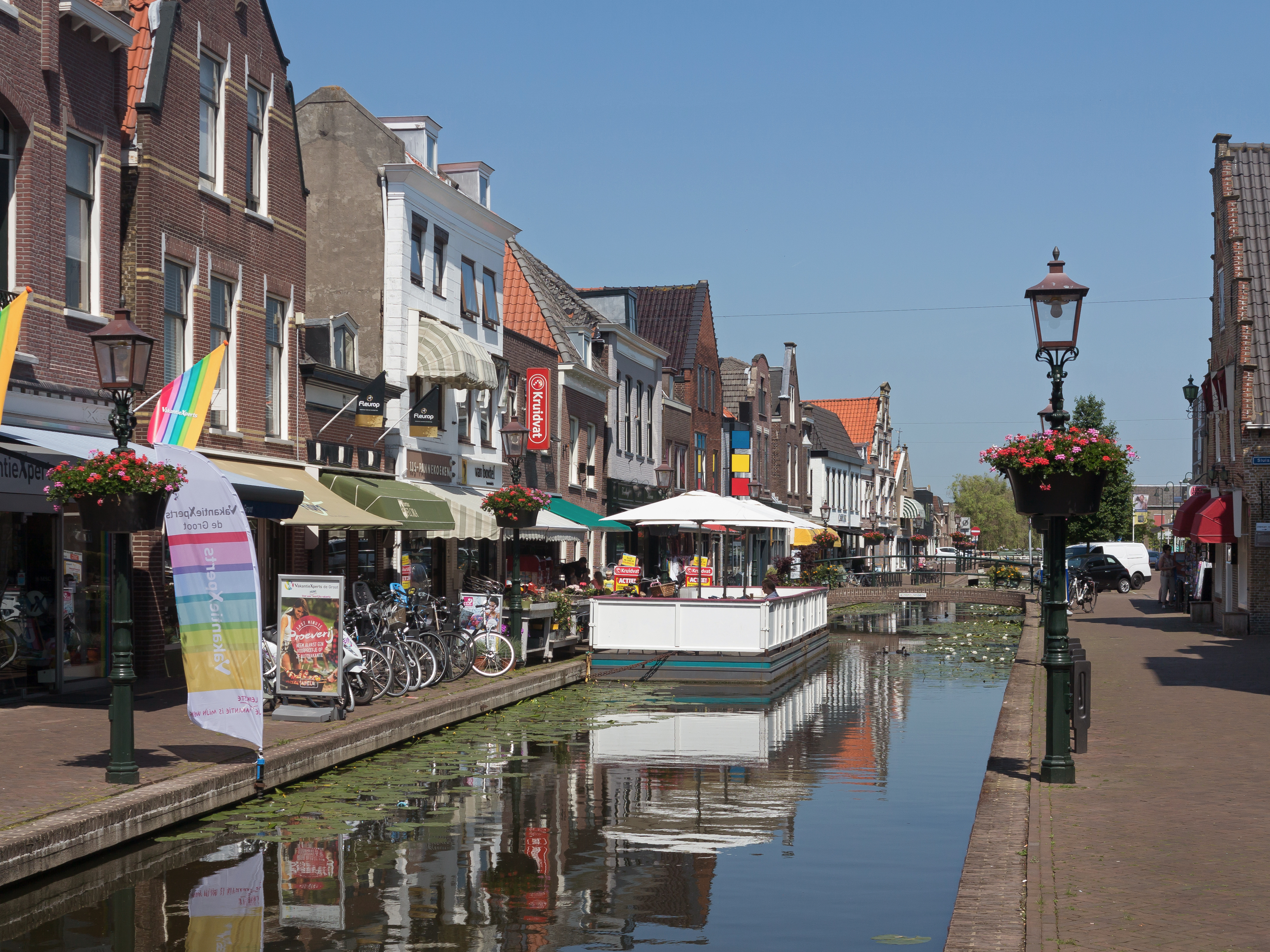
Streetview: de Doctor Kuyperkade

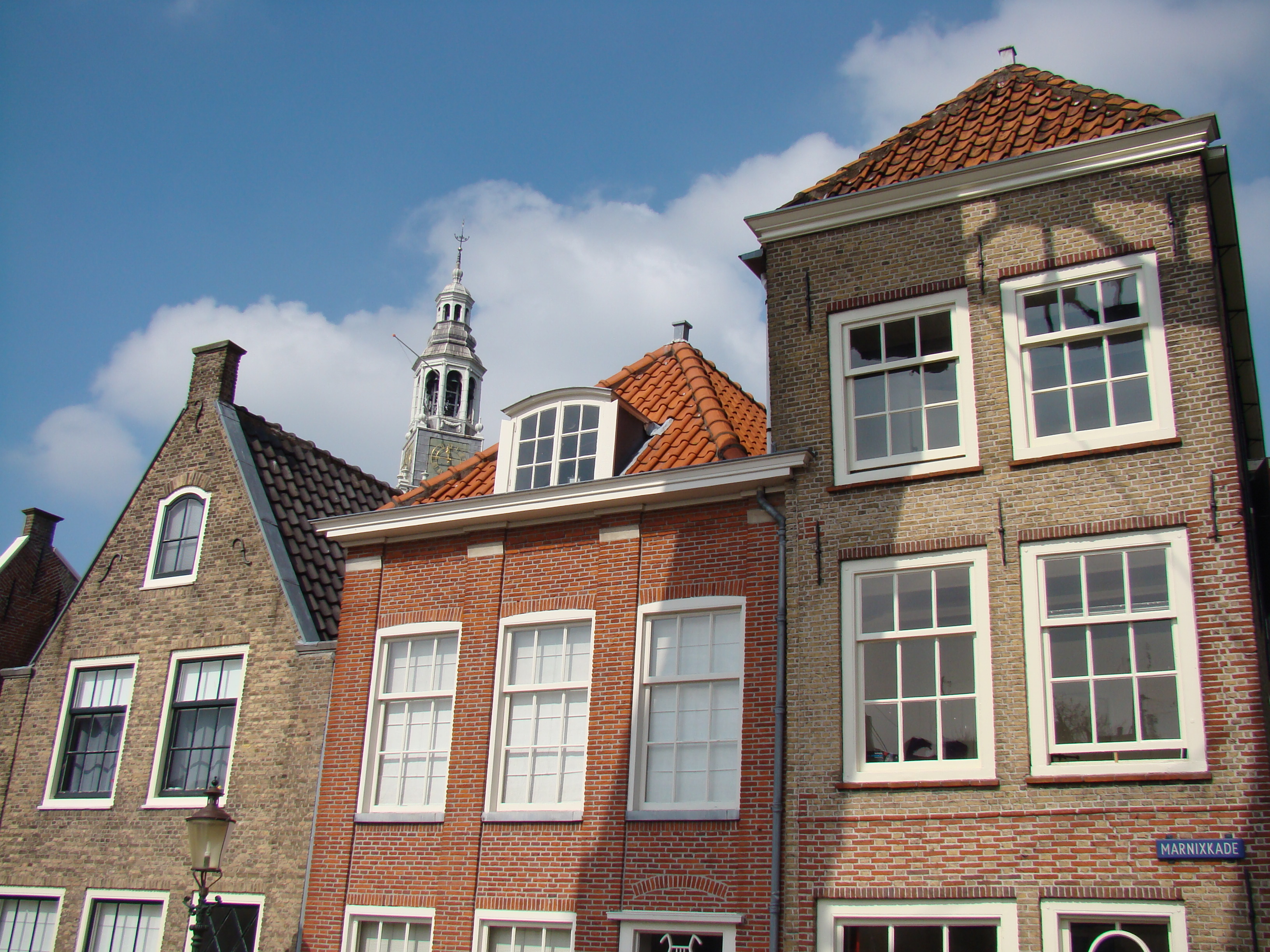
The "Marnixkade"

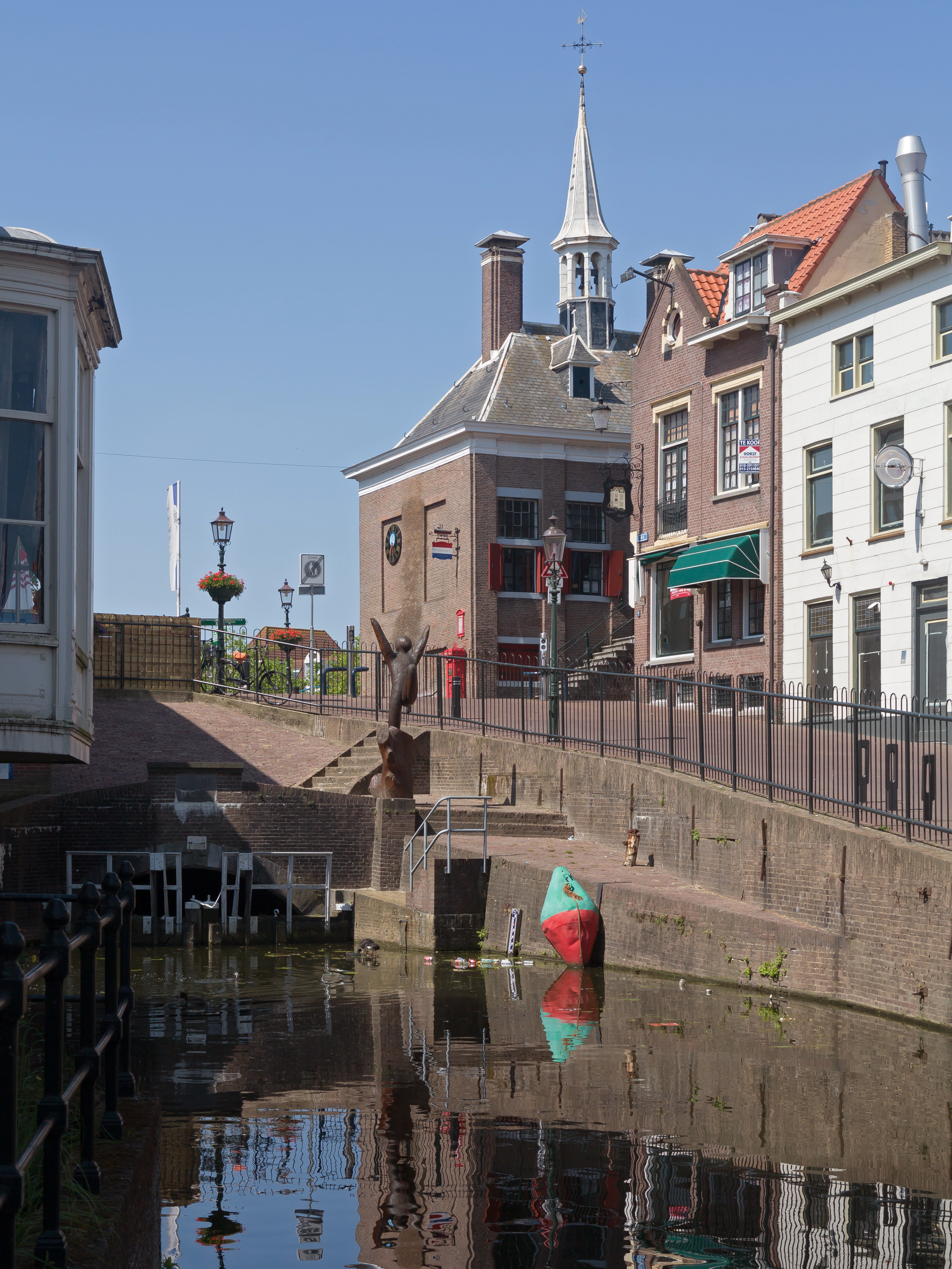
Streetview: the Wip

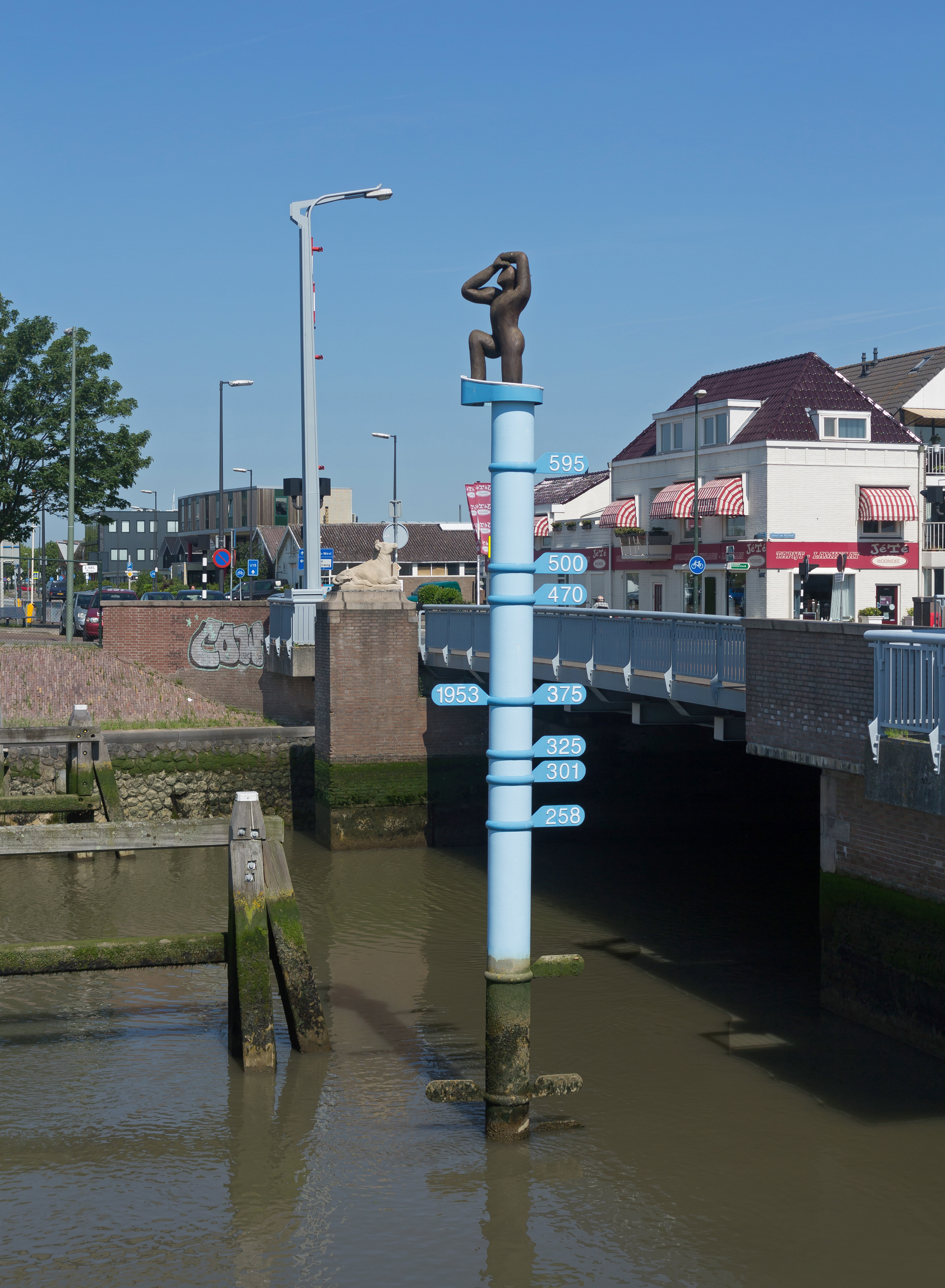
Flow pole with statue

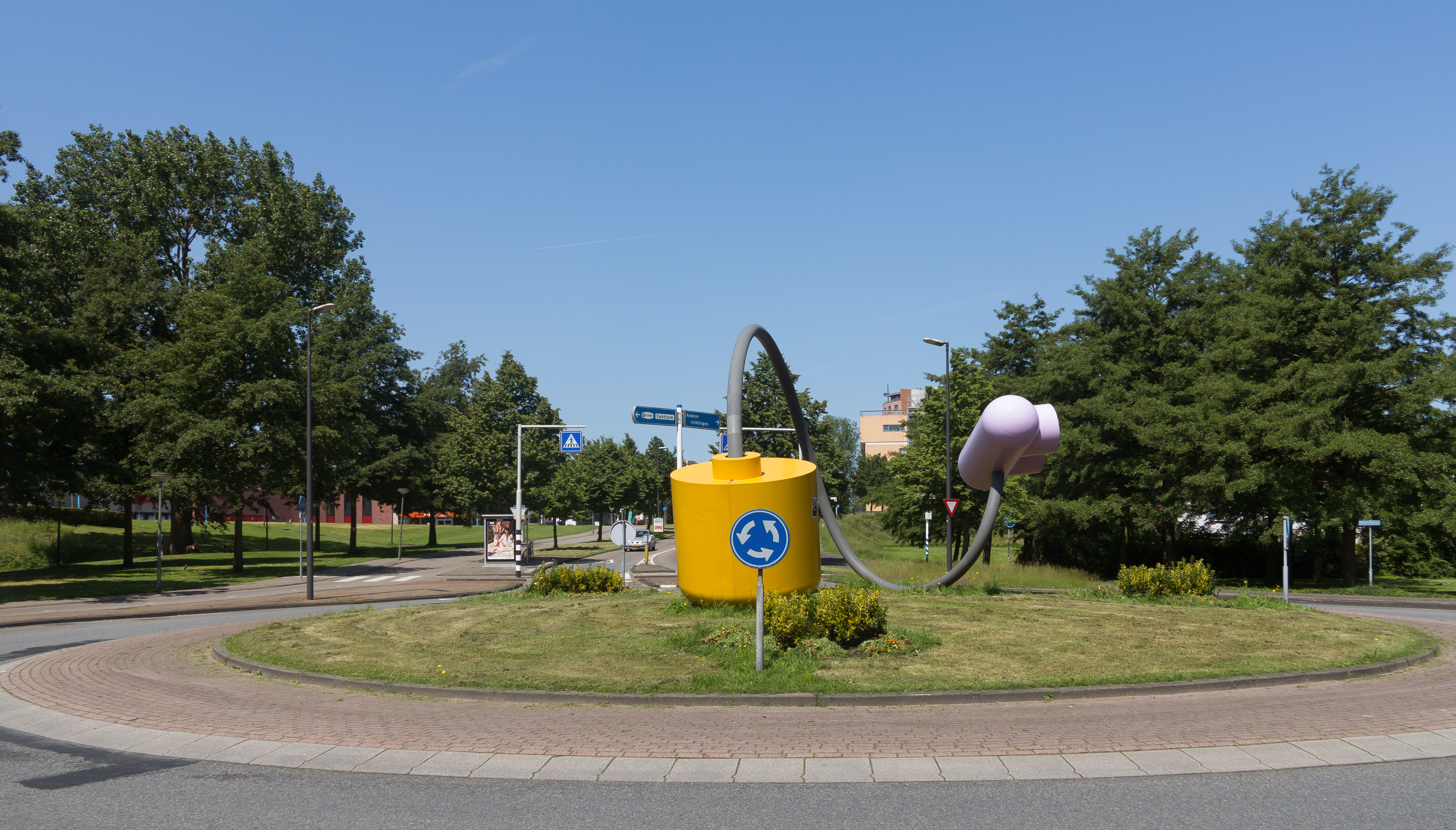
Sculpture (de Calypso)

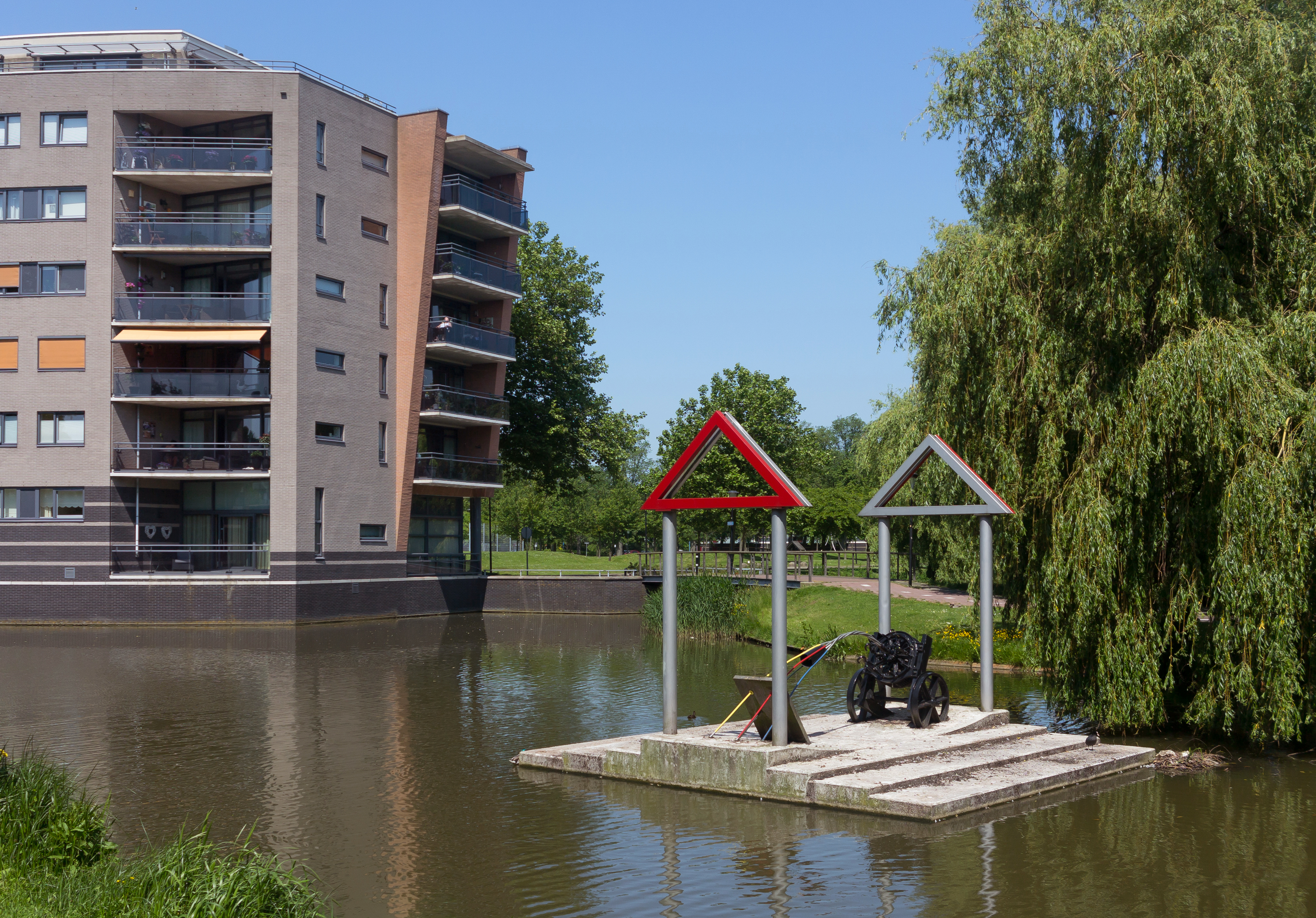
Artwork floating on raft

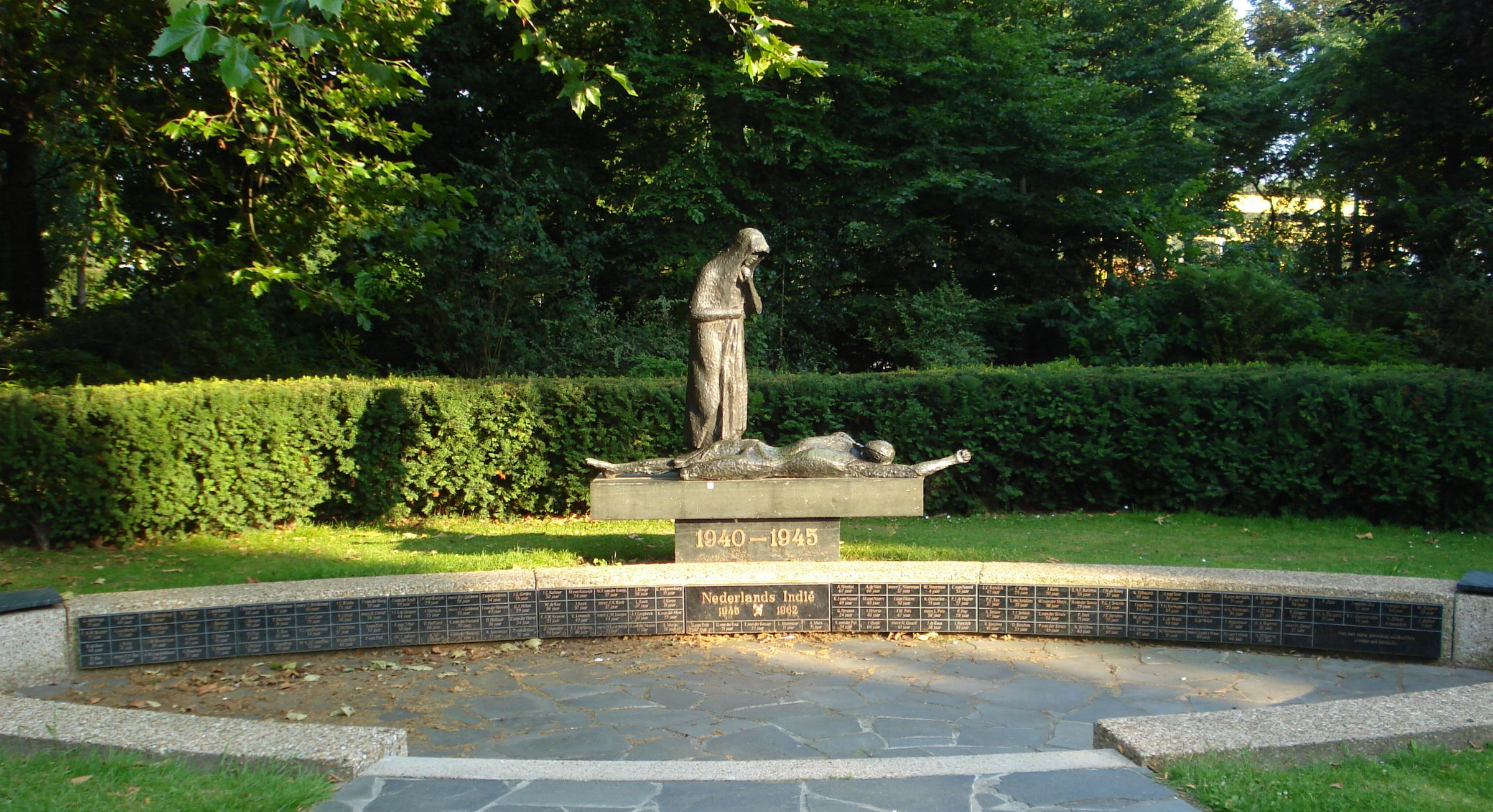
War memorial by Ek van Zanten
