= Singel Uitgeverijen =

Dutch publishing group

Singel Uitgeverijen is a Dutch publishing group, headquartered in Amsterdam. Its subsidiaries are Nijgh & Van Ditmar, Querido Verlag, De Arbeiderspers, Athenaeum, Polak & Van Gennep, De Geus, and Volt. Books are also published directly by Singel Uitgeverijen.

== Subsidiaries ==
=== De Arbeiderspers ===
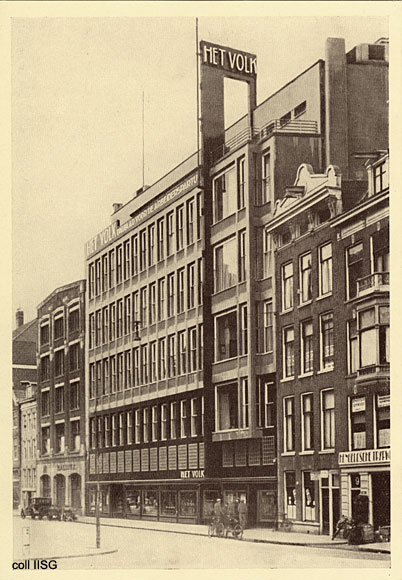
Former building of Het Volk and De Arbeiderspers, Hekelveld 15, Amsterdam, designed by Jan Buijs

De Arbeiderspers (Dutch for "The Workers' Press") is a Dutch publishing company, started in 1929 as a socialist enterprise that combined the publishing firm N.V. Ontwikkeling and the Dutch Social Democratic Workers' Party newspaper Het Volk. It later merged into the Weekbladpersgroep, which also included publishing companies De Bezige Bij and Querido. Until well into the 1960s, the press was known as a "socialist bastion", and until Martin Ros joined in 1964, literature was regarded with suspicion—the press published regional novels by authors such as Herman de Man and A.M. de Jong.

Martin Ros, a well-read and well-spoken man, was hired specifically to "stir the pot". One of his first acquisitions was Gerrit Komrij, at the time a young poet with formalist, not socialist, tendencies. Ros was also responsible, with then-director Johan Veeninga, for the Privé-domein series, containing memoirs and autobiographies. The series was inspired by a similar series of ego documents by Editions du Cap, called Domaine privé, whose title was borrowed as well. The first volumes (containing a memoir by Mary McCarthy and a volume of titillating diary entries by Paul Léautaud) were published in 1966, and in forty-five years almost three hundred books appeared in the series. The "golden years" of the series were the 1980s, when its editors were Martin Ros, Theo Sontrop, and Emile Brugman.

Theo Sontrop joined the company in 1972. Until 1991, Sontrop was the managing director. Ronald Dietz succeeded him, and during his tenure, the press lost the high-profile writers Jeroen Brouwers and Kristien Hemmerechts. Martin Ros resigned in 1997. When in 2000 Gerrit Komrij, one of the best-known Dutch writers, came under contract with De Bezige Bij, pressure on Dietz increased and he resigned from his position. Rob Haans became interim director.

=== Brave New Books ===
Brave New Books is Singel's platform for self-publication, in collaboration with the webshop Bol.com.

=== Nijgh & Van Ditmar ===
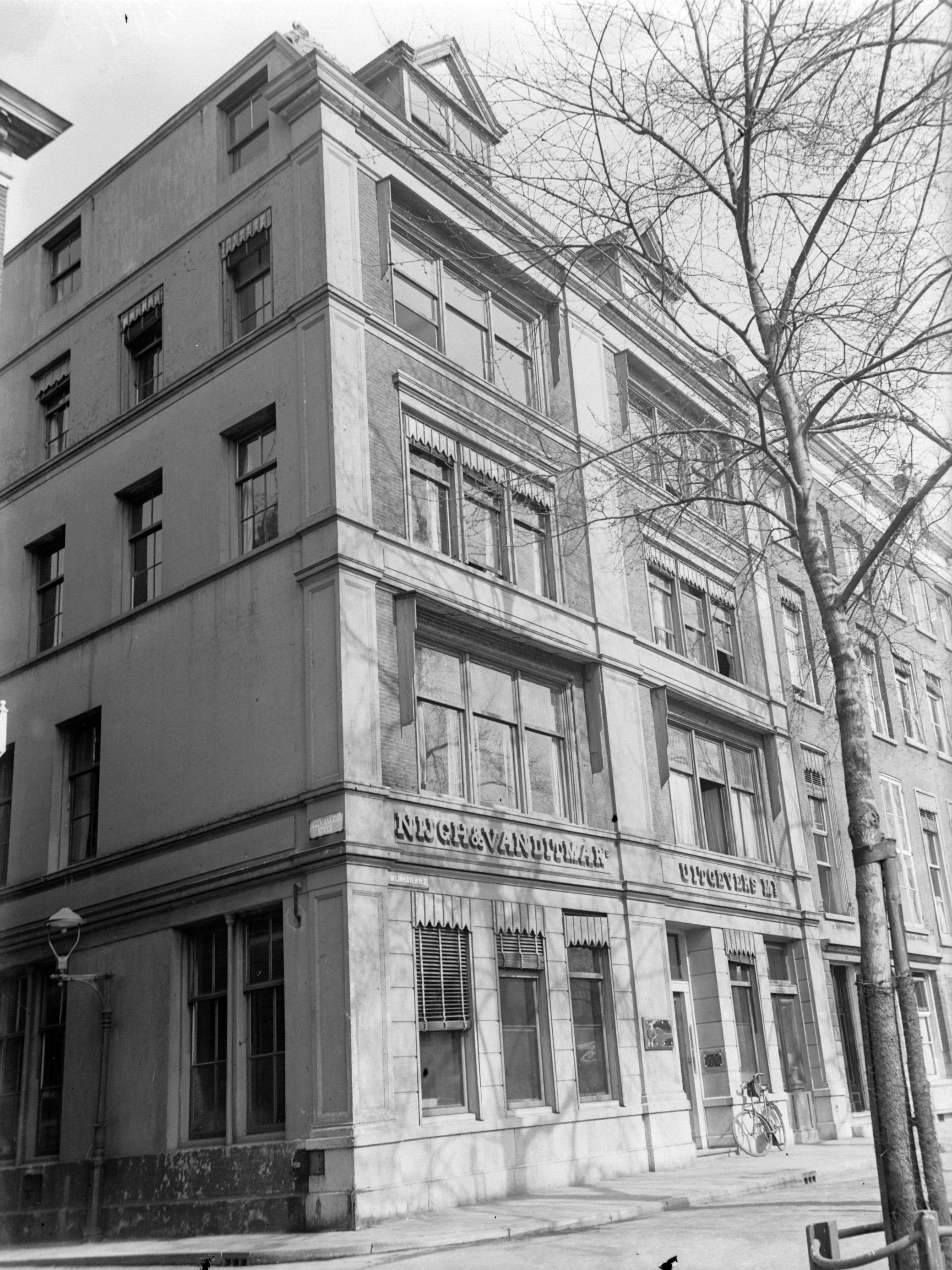
Nijgh & Van Ditmar Publishers in Rotterdam, 1933

Nijgh & Van Ditmar is a Dutch publishing company, founded in 1837 in Rotterdam by Henricus Nijgh, who originally started a bookstore but quickly discovered that the publishing business was profitable as well. Nijgh was also the founder, in 1843, of the Rotterdamsch staats-, handels-, nieuws- en advertentieblad, which later became the Nieuwe Rotterdamsche Courant. In 1864 he teamed up with Willem Nicolaas Josua van Ditmar, whose last name was added to the firm's name in 1870. In 2014 Nijgh & Van Ditmar was acquired by Singel Uitgeverijen.

== Imprints ==
=== Conserve ===
Conserve was a publishing house (Dutch: "Uitgeverij Conserve") established as in 1983 in Schoorl by Kees de Bakker. The company specialised in publishing historical novels. Cynthia McLeod was one of the authors published by Conserve. Publications include Lord of Formosa. Conserve merged into Singel on 1 January 2019. At Singel, Conserve books are published as the imprints De Geus-Conserve and Volt-Conserve.
