= Biegel =

Biegel may refer to:

== People ==
- Anton Biegel, Austrian slalom canoeist
- Erwin Biegel (1896–1954), German stage and film actor
- Kevin Biegel, television writer/producer
- Paul Biegel (1925–2006), Dutch author
- Rebekka Aleida Biegel (1886–1943), Dutch applied psychologist
- Vince Biegel (born 1993), American American football player

== Places ==
- Biegel (mountain), Germany

== See also ==
- Bagel
