= Bibi Dumon Tak =

Dutch writer of children's literature

- Born: Margaretha Anna (Bibi) Dumon Tak; 21 December 1964 (age 61) Rotterdam, Netherlands
- Occupation: Writer
- Language: Dutch
- Notable awards: Gouden Griffel 2012; Theo Thijssen-prijs 2018

Margaretha Anna (Bibi) Dumon Tak (born 21 December 1964) is a Dutch writer of children's literature. After completing her degree in Dutch Literature, in 2001 Bibi Dumon Tak began her career as a children's non-fiction author with Het koeienboek (The Cow Book, 2001).

== Career ==
Dumon Tak made her debut in 2002 with the book Het koeienboek. She won the Zilveren Griffel award for this book. She went on to win the Zilveren Griffel award several more times in the years that followed: in 2004 for Camera loopt... Actie!, in 2007 for Bibi’s bijzondere beestenboek and in 2010 for Fiet wil rennen.

Her book Camera loopt... Actie! takes a look behind the scenes of the 2003 film Polleke which itself is based on children's books written by Guus Kuijer.

In 2006, she wrote the book Laika tussen de sterren which was the Kinderboekenweekgeschenk on the occasion of the annual Boekenweek, based on the life of Laika, the first animal in space. In 2012, she won the Gouden Griffel award for her book Winterdieren.

Several of Dumon Tak's books have been translated into English by Laura Watkinson. Watkinson's publisher won the Mildred L. Batchelder Award in 2012 for the book Soldier Bear and 2015 for the book Mikis and the Donkey.

In 2018, she won the Theo Thijssen-prijs for her entire oeuvre.

In 2019, her book Laat een boodschap achter in het zand (illustrated by Annemarie van Haeringen) was on the shortlist for the Jan Wolkers Prijs.

In 2023, Dumon Tak and Annemarie van Haeringen won the Woutertje Pieterse Prijs for the book Vandaag houd ik mijn spreekbeurt over de anaconda.

Dumon Tak's books have been illustrated by various illustrators including Fleur van der Weel, Fiel van der Veen and Fiep Westendorp. Her books have been published by Querido.

== Personal life ==
Dumon Tak is married to Jan Paul Schutten who is also an award-winning writer of Dutch children's literature.

== Awards ==
- 2002: Zilveren Griffel, Het koeienboek
- 2004: Zilveren Griffel, Camera loopt... Actie!
- 2007: Zilveren Griffel, Bibi’s bijzondere beestenboek
- 2010: Zilveren Griffel, Fiet wil rennen
- 2012: Gouden Griffel, Winterdieren
- 2017: Zilveren Griffel, Siens hemel
- 2018: Theo Thijssen-prijs, entire oeuvre
- 2018: Vlag en Wimpel, Het heel grote vogelboek
- 2019: Zilveren Griffel, Laat een boodschap achter in het zand
- 2023: Woutertje Pieterse Prijs, Vandaag houd ik mijn spreekbeurt over de anaconda (with Annemarie van Haeringen)
