= Gorp (disambiguation) =

Gorp is another name for trail mix, a snack food.

Gorp may also refer to:

- Gorp (film), a 1980 comedy film
- Gorp, Netherlands, a hamlet
- Gorpcore, a fashion trend

== See also ==
- Garp (disambiguation)
- Gorps (disambiguation)
- Van Gorp
