= The King of the Copper Mountains =

Children's novel by Paul Biegel

- First edition (Dutch)
- Author: Paul Biegel
- Original title: Het Sleutelkruid
- Translator: Paul Biegel
- Illustrator: Gillian Hume, Babs Van Wely, Sally J. Collins
- Language: Dutch
- Genre: Children's literature, frame story
- Publisher: J. M. Dent
- Publication date: 1964
- Publication place: The Netherlands
- English publication date: 1968
- ISBN: 978-1-905537-03-7
- OCLC: 220015422

The King of The Copper Mountains is a children's novel by Paul Biegel, and was originally published as Het Sleutelkruid in the Netherlands in 1964, where it won the Gouden Griffel, the award for the best children's book of the year. An English translation by the author with illustrations by Gilliam Hume was published in 1968 by J. M. Dent. It was reprinted by Franklin Watts in 1969, by Collins Armada in 1971, 1973 and 1989, and by Fontana Lions in 1980 and 1987. The book was also translated into German, Afrikaans, Danish, and Spanish.

Told in a style similar to The Arabian Nights, it concerns the failing health of an elderly king who is kept alive by stories told by visiting animals. The book received widespread acclaim in Europe, won the Dutch literary prize for children's literature, and is now considered a classic. Amanda Craig described it in The Times in 2008 as "one of the blazing jewels of children's literature."

A paperback re-issue by Glasgow-based Strident Publishing from 2008 includes new illustrations and an introduction by the author's daughter Leonie.
