= A Real Friend =

2020 children's book by Jennifer Wolfthal

- Author: Jennifer Wolfthal
- Original title: Een echte vriend
- Illustrator: Judi Abbot
- Language: English
- Genre: Children's
- Publisher: Clavis
- Publication date: 2020
- Publication place: Belgium; Netherlands; United States
- Pages: 32
- ISBN: 978-1-6053-7582-3

A Real Friend is a 2020 children's picture book by author Jennifer Wolfthal and illustrator Judi Abbot. The book depicts the friendship between two boys, Benny and Max, as they navigate their differences and face a falling-out.

In January 2021, the book's publisher Clavis withdrew A Real Friend from sale after Wolfthal and her husband were arrested for child abuse and child neglect.

== Plot ==
Best friends Benny and Max enjoy playing video games and hide-and-seek. However, Benny grows frustrated with some of Max's qualities, such as Max's different taste in sandwiches and interest in bugs, and he starts to feel that Max is always getting his own way when they are together.

When the boys have a fight over whose turn it is to play video games, Benny resolves to find a new best friend. He uses his toys and other household items to build a robotic-looking assemblage that he calls Jax.

Benny is initially happy to play with Jax, who never asks for his turn to play video games and always lets Benny hide during hide-and-seek. However, Benny grows bored of always doing the same things with Jax, and starts to miss his friendship with Max.

Benny takes Jax over to Max's house, where he discovers that Max has also built a new friend Lenny. The two boys reconcile and play together with their robots.

== Publication history ==
A Real Friend was originally published as Een echte vriend in Belgium and the Netherlands. The book was published in November 2020 in the United States.

Wolfthal and her husband Joseph were arrested in Florida in January 2021 after their 8-year-old daughter was hospitalized with multiple organ failure, sepsis, pneumonia, and malnutrition. They were charged with child abuse, child neglect, and false imprisonment of a child. In response, the book's publisher Clavis said that it would "do what’s within our power to cease commercialization" of A Real Friend. Wolfthal was removed from Clavis' list of authors, and the book was removed from sale on Amazon. Wolfthal's Instagram account and author website were also deactivated.

Jennifer and Joseph Wolfthal pled guilty in January 2025 to charges of abusing their three children, who were adopted in 2014. The children were reportedly locked in their bedrooms, beaten, malnourished, forced to write lines, and made to sleep in wet beds. As part of the plea deal, Wolfthal received a 12-year prison sentence, while her husband received 10 years.

== Reception ==
Kirkus Reviews said that A Real Friend was "a feel-good read about a friendship that feels real, indeed" and that the book's illustrations "largely reflect the text, the two boys’ expressions easy to read on their perfectly round faces." School Library Journal wrote that "Abbot’s illustrations in acrylic, collage, colored pencils, and digital media pair well with Wolfthal’s text", calling the book "a well-told, relatable story about friendship, fighting, and making up for children everywhere."
