= Paul Teng =

Dutch comic book writer

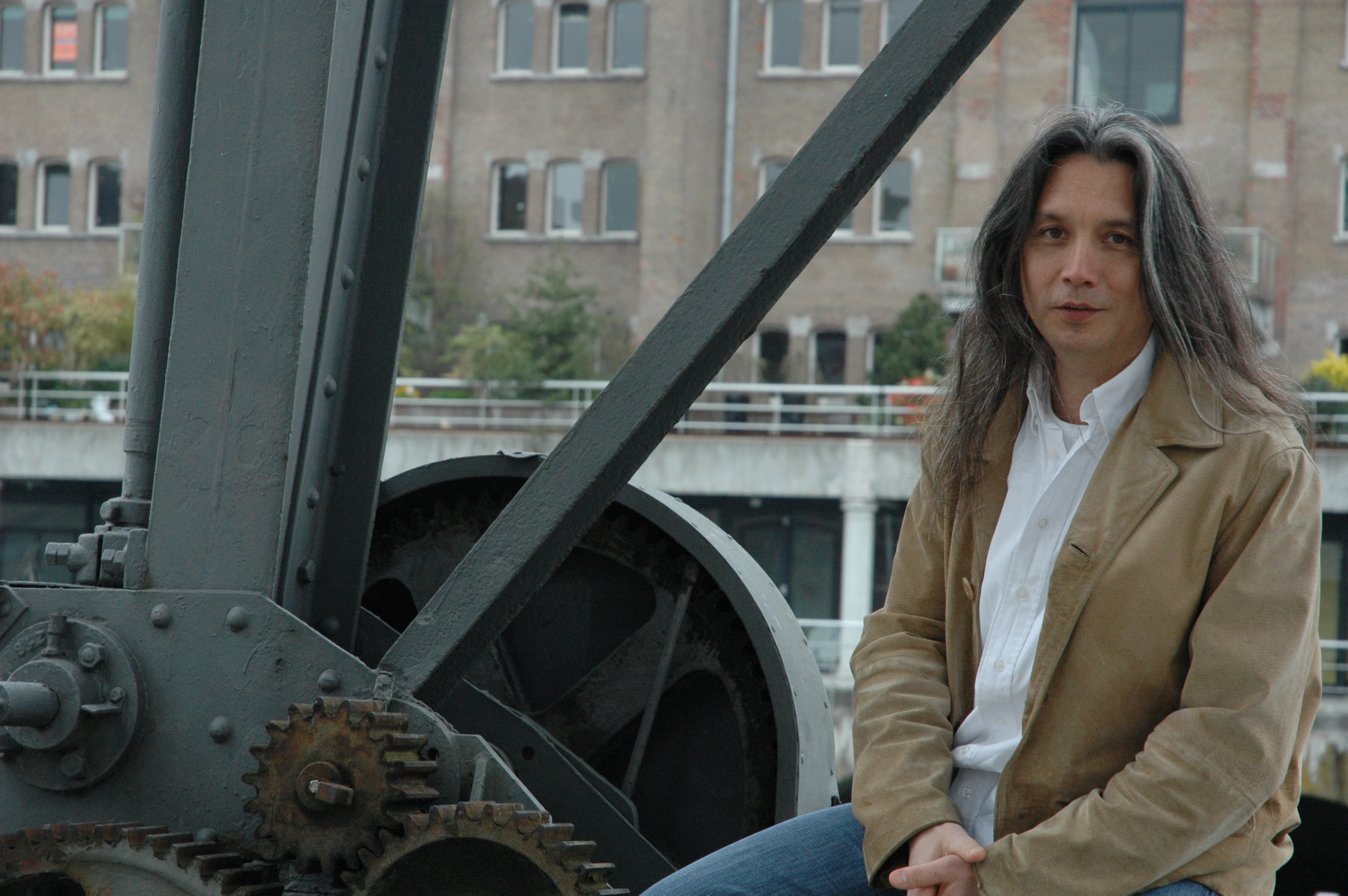
- Born: Paul Teng Ping Ya; March 6, 1955 (age 71) Rotterdam, Netherlands
- Area: Writer
- Notable works: De telescoop Libertair Intermezzo; Igor Steiner
- Awards: full list

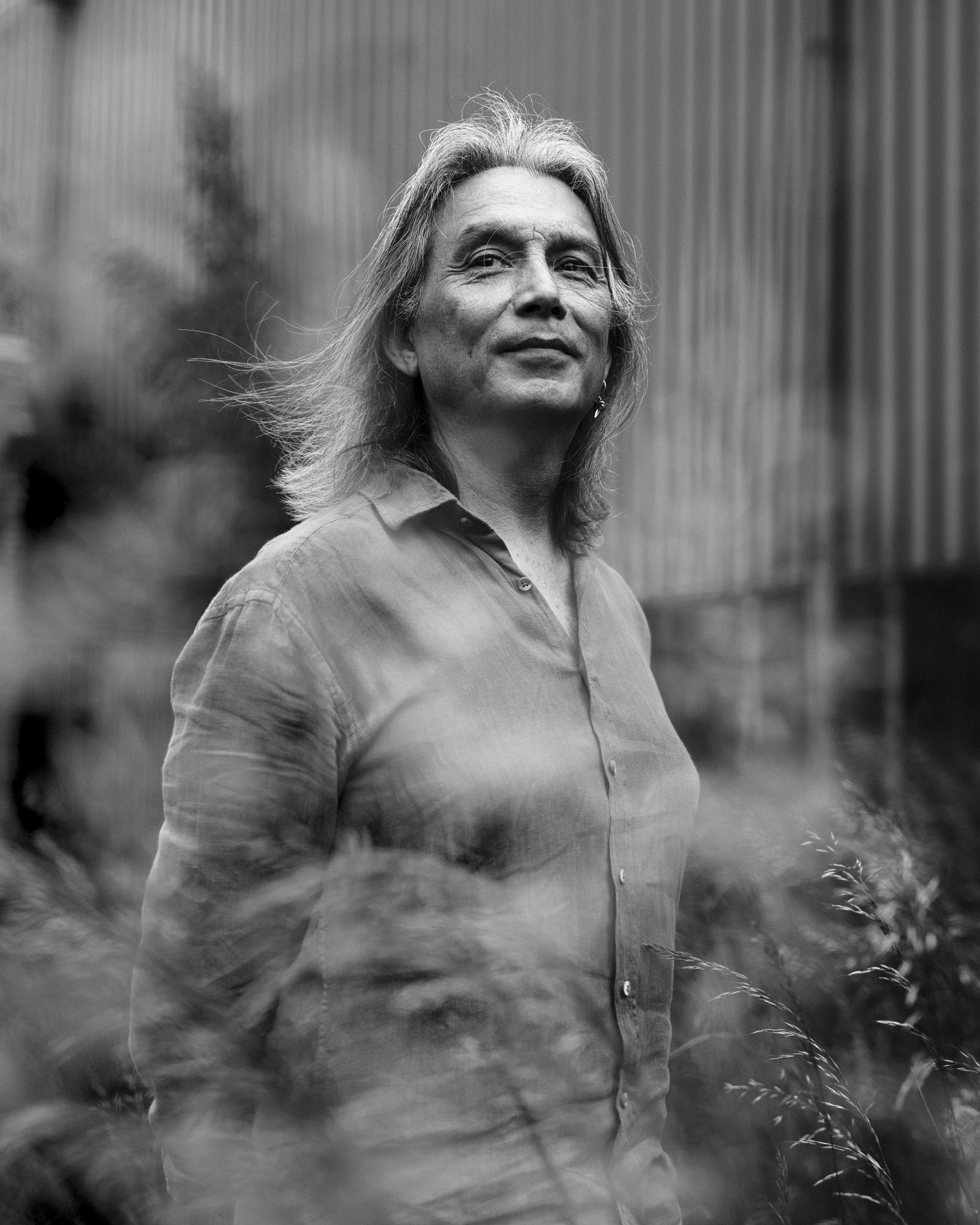
Paul Teng 2021, photography by Marieke Odekerken

Paul Teng Ping Ya (born 6 March 1955) is a Dutch comic book writer and artist. He writes and draws mainly realistic historical comics.

== Early life ==
Teng was born in Rotterdam. After high-school he studied cultural anthropology in Amsterdam. His interest in comic books started early. He stopped his study to start writing comic books.

After reading Karl May books he became fascinated with the history of indigenous people in North America. His first comic had as a main figure the Apache Indian Delgadito. Delgadito is a black and white series of 4 issues. Teng developed the series' scenario.

In 1986 the comic Libertair Intermezzo issued. The comic takes place during the Spanish Civil War. The comic is about a researcher in current time and a resistance group in the 1930s planning attacks against the establishment.

In 1986 another historical comic issued, De vrienden van Igor Steiner (eng: The friends of Igor Steiner). This comic and the comic Vladimir Volkoff (2 issues) are about Russia. The comic Vladimir Volkoff was his first comic in color.

From 1998 onwards he wrote his series Shane. The series takes plays in the European Middle Ages, the 12th century. The scenario was written by Jean Francois Di Giorgio. The series contains 5 issues.

From 2004 until 2008 the comic series De oneven orde appeared. This has a complicated scenario that switches between current time and the Middle Ages. The series is about a mystical manuscript that is about death and destruction. The scenario's are written by Rudi Miel and Christina Cuadra. The series contains 5 issues.

Paul Teng wrote many short stories for the girls-magazine Tina. One of the issues is about The Girl with the Red Hair (a book from Teun de Vries) about the Dutch underground resistance fighter Hannie Schaft during the Second World War.

He made a short comic introduction for each chapter of the children's book Kinderen van Amsterdam, a history book for children about children who played a role in the history of Amsterdam. This book was written by Jan Paul Schutten and won the Gouden Griffel a Dutch award for the best and original children's book issued in 2008. After this project he did the same for the book Kinderen van Nederland.

Together with Jean Van Hamme who wrote the scenario, he issued the one-shot De Telescoop (eng: The Telescope) in 2008. The comic is based on a novel written by Van Hamme in 1992. The story takes place in the current time and is about five old men and their relation with a call-girl.

Teng is currently working on a sequel of his comic De vrienden van Igor Steiner. He is writing the scenario. The story takes place 8 years after the previous issue at the border of Poland and Ukraine during the Polish–Soviet War.

His other project is an assignment of the Centraal Museum in Utrecht about the art of painting there. He is working together with Jan Paul Schutten. The main character in this series is the painter Jan van Scorel, the museum has an art hall named after van Scorel and his biography has many issues to make an interesting comic about. This historical book is due in 2013, the 300th anniversary of the Treaty of Utrecht.

In 2012 was announced that he wins the Stripschapprijs 2013 for his complete oeuvre.

== Bibliography ==
Paul Teng illustrated Comics and Children's books.

=== Comic books ===
- Delgadito (writer: Paul Teng, artwork: Paul Teng)
1. De keuze van de adelaar (1981, ISBN 9070106795)
2. Herinnering aan een Rebel (1981, ISBN 9064381623)
3. Bosque Redondo (1982, ISBN 9064381666)
4. De cirkel geschonden (1984, ISBN 9064380880)
- Libertair intermezzo (1986, writer: Paul Teng, artwork: Paul Teng, ISBN 9789030384298)
- De vrienden van Igor Steiner (1989, writer: Paul Teng, artwork: Paul Teng, ISBN 9789030383956)
- Sint Vladimir - De stralende zon (1992, writer: Vladimir Volkoff, artwork: Paul Teng, ISBN 9789064219085)
- Alexander Nevsky (1994, writer: Vladimir Volkoff, artwork: Paul Teng, ISBN 9789055810130)
- Shane (writer: Jean-François Di Giorgio, artwork: Paul Teng)
1. De meedogenloze keizerin (1998, ISBN 9789055811595)
2. De adelaarsrots (1999, ISBN 9789055812363)
3. Schijngestalten (2000, ISBN 9789055812875)
4. Albane (2001, ISBN 9789055813322)
5. Het toernooi (2002, ISBN 9789055814039)
- De Oneven orde (writer: Cristina Cuadra & Rudi Miel, artwork: Paul Teng)
1. Antwerpen 1585 (2004, ISBN 9789055814626)
2. Sevilla 1600 (2005, ISBN 9789055815654)
3. Roma 1644 (2006, ISBN 9789055816019)
4. Parijs 1791 (2007, ISBN 9789055816217)
5. Het laatste hoofdstuk (2008, ISBN 9789055816484)
- De telescoop (2009, writer: Jean van Hamme, Artwork: Paul Teng, ISBN 9789030363101)
- Jan van Scorel - Sede Vacante 1523 (2013, writer: Jan Paul Schutten, Artwork: Paul Teng, ISBN 9789462260207)

=== Children's books ===
- Kinderen van Amsterdam (2007, writer: Jan Paul Schutten, Artwork: Paul Teng, ISBN 9789025751807)
- Kinderen van Nederland (2008, writer: Jan Paul Schutten, Artwork: Paul Teng, ISBN 9789046804193)

== Awards ==
- 2008 - De Gouden Griffel
- 2013 - Stripschapprijs

Nominated

- 2010 - nominated for Best Dutch Language Comic at the Prix Saint-Michel
