= Jaap ter Haar =

Dutch author of children's literature

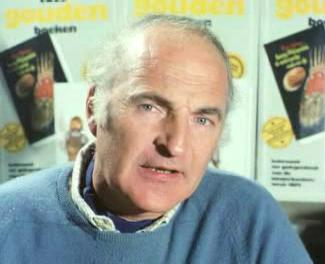
- Jaap ter Haar (1974)
- Born: Jacob Everard (Jaap) ter Haar; 25 March 1922
- Died: 26 February 1998 (aged 75) Laren, Netherlands
- Notable awards: Nienke van Hichtum-prijs 1972; Gouden Griffel 1974; Buxtehude Bull 1976

Jaap ter Haar (25 March 1922 – 26 February 1998) was a prolific Dutch author of children's literature.

== Career ==
Early in his career Ter Haar worked for the Radio Netherlands Worldwide. In addition to his day job, ter Haar made many radio plays for broadcaster NCRV featuring stories of the characters Saskia and Jeroen. These stories were later adapted and published as a book series. When Radio Netherlands Worldwide no longer permitted employees to earn income outside of work, Ter Haar decided to become a full-time writer in 1952. Out of financial necessity, he published many books over the course of his career. In addition to the characters Saskia and Jeroen, he also wrote many book series featuring the characters Lotje, Eelke, and Ernstjan and Snabbeltje.

Ter Haar won the Nienke van Hichtum-prijs in 1972 for his book Geschiedenis van de Lage Landen. He won the Gouden Griffel award for his book Het wereldje van Beer Ligthart. In 1976 he won the Buxtehude Bull for the book Behalt das Leben lieb, the German translation of Het wereldje van Beer Ligthart by Hans-Joachim Schädlich.

Ter Haar's books have been illustrated by various illustrators, including Gerard van Straaten, Charlotte Dematons and Rein van Looy. Other illustrators include Rien Poortvliet and Otto Dicke.

== Awards ==
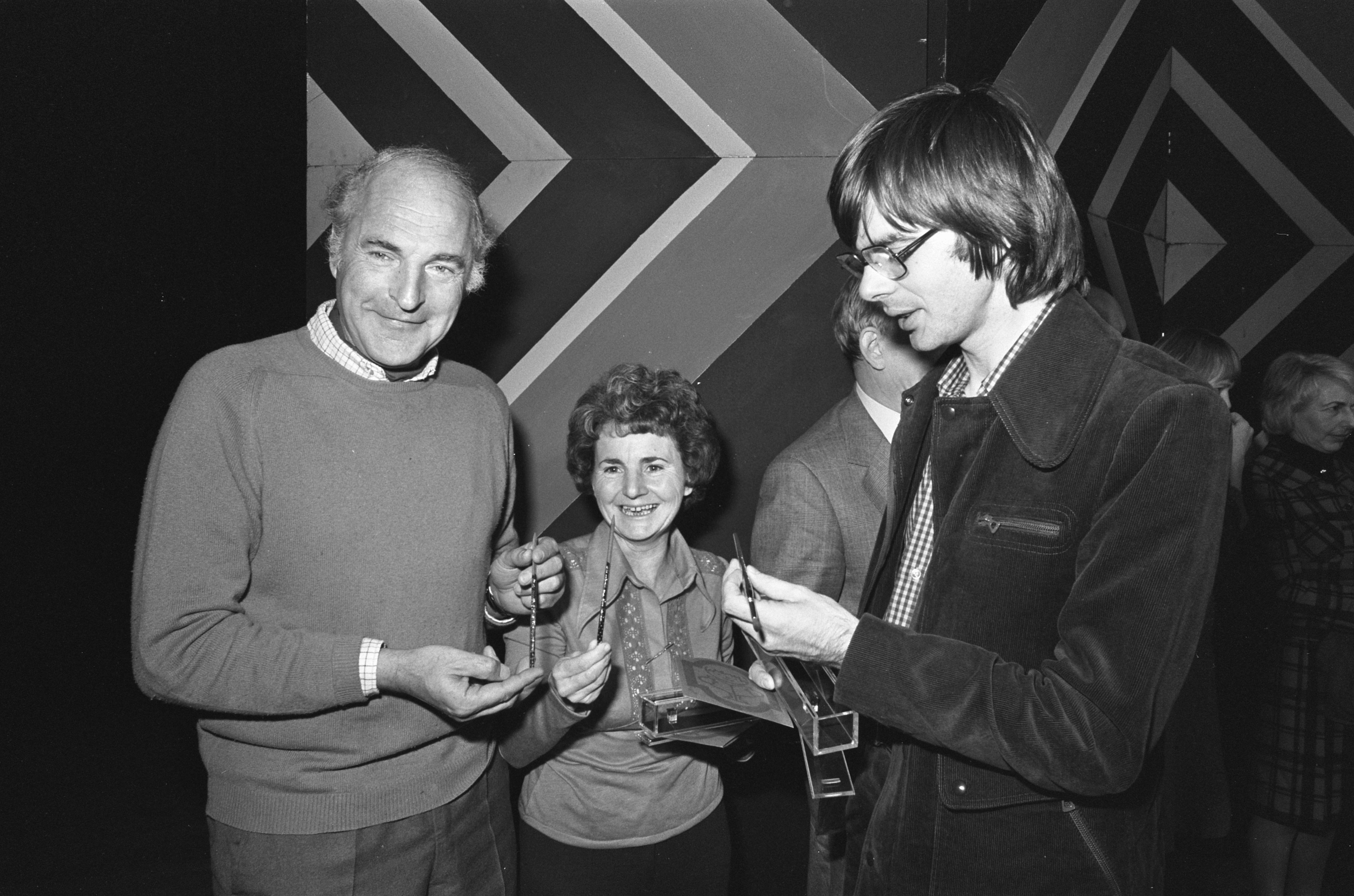
Ter Haar, Thea Beckman and Wim Hofman in 1974.

- 1972: Nienke van Hichtum-prijs, Geschiedenis van de Lage Landen
- 1974: Gouden Griffel, Het wereldje van Beer Ligthart
- 1976: Buxtehude Bull, Behalt das Leben lieb
