= Martha Heesen =

Dutch writer (born 1948)

- Born: 6 May 1948 (age 76); Oisterwijk, Netherlands
- Notable awards: Theo Thijssen-prijs 2015

Martha Heesen (born 6 May 1948) is a Dutch writer.

== Career ==
In 2004, she won the Golden Book-Owl for her book Toen Faas niet thuiskwam.

In 2007, she received the Vlag en Wimpel award for the book Wolf.

In 2015, she won the Theo Thijssen-prijs.

== Awards ==
- 2000: Zilveren Griffel, De vloek van Cornelia
- 2001: Zilveren Griffel, Mijn zusje is een monster
- 2002: Zilveren Griffel, Stekels
- 2004: Golden Book-Owl, Toen Faas niet thuiskwam
- 2007: Vlag en Wimpel, Wolf
- 2015: Theo Thijssen-prijs
