= Gouden Griffel =

Dutch literary award

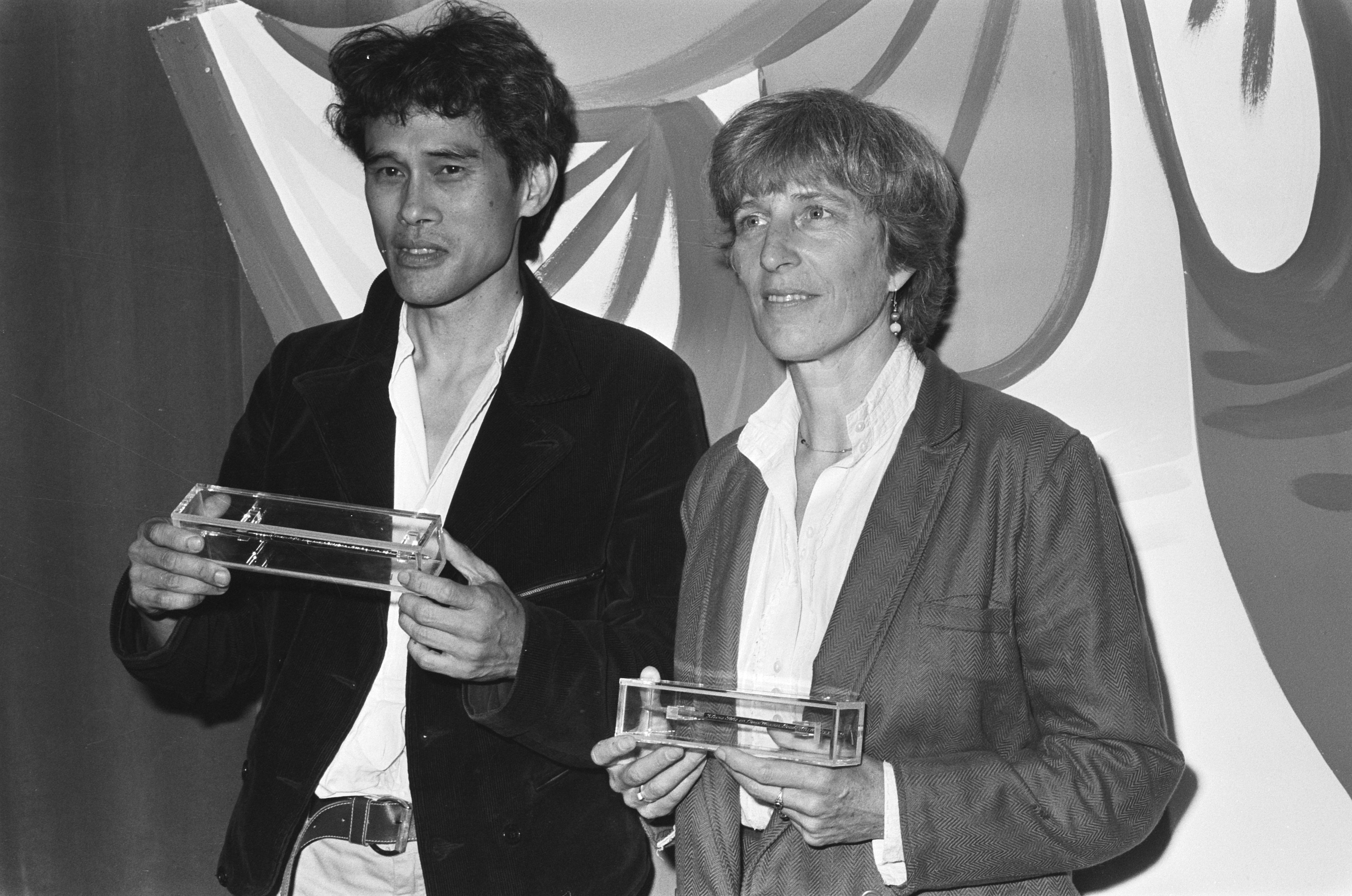
Els Pelgrom and Thé Tjong-Khing receiving the Gouden Griffel and Gouden Penseel awards respectively (1985).

The Gouden Griffel (Golden Stylus) is an award given to authors of children's or teenagers' literature in the Netherlands.

== History ==
Since 1971, it is awarded each year during the Dutch Children's Books Week, by the Stichting Collectieve Propaganda van het Nederlandse Boek (Dutch Book Promotion Society) for the best children's books written in the past year. Between 1954 and 1970, one book per year was declared the "children's book of the year". Since then, griffels are awarded in several categories.

Only novels written in Dutch are eligible for the gouden griffel. However, the runner-up awards (Silver griffels) can also be given to translated works. Aside from these, the Gouden Penseel (golden paintbrush) is awarded to the best illustrated children's books (with silver penseel as a runner-up), and since 1997 the Gouden Zoen (golden kiss, with silver as a runner-up) is awarded to the best books for teenagers.

There is no award for 1960, as the award was then no longer named for the year of production of the book, but the year of the ceremony (i.e. one year later). Between 1966 and 1971, two awards were given, one for books for readers of ten years or less, and one for older readers. Until 1986, one or two awards were given, but without age categories. Since 1986, only one Gouden Griffel per year is awarded. No awards were given in 1967.

Since 2011, the Griffel is specifically for books for ages 6–12, and a new prize, the Gouden Lijst, was instated for books for ages 12–15. The inaugural winner was Rindert Kromhout for Soldaten huilen niet ("Soldiers don't cry"); there was also a Gouden Lijst for a translated boek, Mal Peet's Tamar.

== Beste kinderboek van het jaar ==
Polygoon newsreel on the Kinderboekenweek 1974. Jaap ter Haar, received the "Gouden Griffel" award with the children's book The world of Bear Ligthart. Thea Beckman receives an award for children's book Crusade in jeans. The Golden Brush went to writer and illustrator Wim Hofman for his book Koning Wikkepokluk de merkwaardige zoekt een rijk.

- 1954: An Rutgers van der Loeff-Basenau, Lawines razen, Ploegsma
- 1955: Cor Bruijn, Lasse Länta, Ploegsma
- 1956: Miep Diekmann, De boten van Brakkeput, Leopold
- 1957: Annie M. G. Schmidt, Wiplala, De Arbeiderspers
- 1958: Harriët Laurey, Sinterklaas en de struikrovers, Holland
- 1959: C. E. Pothast-Grimberg, Corso het ezeltje, Van Goor
- 1961: Jan Blokker, Op zoek naar een oom, De Bezige Bij
- 1962: Jean Dulieu, Paulus, de hulpsinterklaas, Ploegsma
- 1963: Tonke Dragt, De brief voor de koning, Leopold
- 1964: W. F. H. Visser, Niku de koerier, Van Goor
- 1965: Paul Biegel, Het sleutelkruid, Holland
- 1966: (Age -10): Mies Bouhuys, Kinderverhalen, Holland

(Age +10): Toos Blom, Loeloedji, kleine rode bloem, De Arbeiderspers

- 1967: No awards
- 1968: (Age -10): Hans Werner, Mattijs Mooimuziek, Westfriesland

(Age +10): Siny van Iterson, De adjudant van de vrachtwagen, Leopold

- 1969: (Age -10): Hans Andreus, Meester Pompelmoes en de Mompelpoes, Holland

(Age +10): Henk Van Kerkwijk, Komplot op volle zee, Ploegsma

- 1970: (Age -10): Harriët Laurey, Verhalen van de spinnende kater, Holland

(Age +10): Frank Herzen, De zoon van de woordbouwer, Sijthoff

== Gouden Griffel ==
- 1971: (Age -10): Leonie Kooiker, Het malle ding van Bobbistiek, Ploegsma

(Age +10): Alet Schouten, De mare van de witte toren, Van Holkema & Warendorf

- 1972: Paul Biegel, De kleine kapitein, Holland

Jan Terlouw, Koning van Katoren, Lemniscaat

- 1973: Henk Barnard, De Marokkaan en de kat van tante Da, Van Holkema & Warendorf

Jan Terlouw, Oorlogswinter, Lemniscaat

- 1974: Jaap ter Haar, Het wereldje van Beer Ligthart, Van Holkema & Waredorf

Thea Beckman, Kruistocht in spijkerbroek, Lemniscaat

- 1975: Simone Schell, De nacht van de heksenketelkandij, Deltos-Elsevier

Alet Schouten, Iolo komt niet spelen, Van Holkema & Warendorf

- 1976: Guus Kuijer, Met de poppen gooien, Querido
- 1977: Henk Barnard, Kon Hesi Baka / Kom gauw terug, Van Holkema & Warendorf
- 1978: Miep Diekmann, Wiele wiele stap, Querido

Els Pelgrom, De kinderen van het achtste woud, Kosmos

- 1979: Guus Kuijer, Krassen in het tafelblad, Querido
- 1980: Simone Schell, Zeezicht, Van Goor
- 1981: Annie M. G. Schmidt, Otje, Querido
- 1982: Nannie Kuiper, De eend op de pot, Leopold
- 1983: Anton Quintana, De bavianenkoning, Van Goor
- 1984: Veronica Hazelhoff, Auww!, Sjaloom

Karel Eykman, Liefdesverdriet, De Harmonie

- 1985: Els Pelgrom, Kleine Sofie en Lange Wapper, Querido
- 1986: Joke van Leeuwen, Deesje, Querido

Willem Wilmink, Waar het hart vol van is, Van Holkema & Warendorf

- 1987: Harriët van Reek, De avonturen van Lena lena, Querido
- 1988: Toon Tellegen, Toen niemand iets te doen had, Querido
- 1989: Wim Hofman, Het vlot, Van Holkema & Warendorf
- 1990: Els Pelgrom, De eikelvreters, Querido
- 1991: Tine van Buul and Bianca Stigter (editors), Als je goed om je heen kijkt zie je dat alles gekleurd is, Querido
- 1992: Max Velthuijs, Kikker en het vogeltje, Leopold
- 1993: Paul Biegel, Nachtverhaal, Leopold
- 1994: Toon Tellegen, Bijna iedereen kon omvallen, Querido
- 1995: Ted van Lieshout, Begin een torentje van niks, Leopold
- 1996: Guus Middag, Ik maak nooit iets mee, De Bezige Bij
- 1997: Sjoerd Kuyper, Robin en God, Leopold
- 1998: Wim Hofman, Zwart als inkt, Querido
- 1999: Anne Makkink, Helden op sokken, Querido
- 2000: Guus Kuijer, Voor altijd samen, amen, Querido
- 2001: Ingrid Godon and André Sollie, Wachten op Matroos, Querido
- 2002: Peter van Gestel, Winterijs, De Fontein
- 2003: Daan Remmerts de Vries, Godje, Querido
- 2004: Hans Hagen, De dans van de drummers, van Goor

Griffel der Griffels (best book of the past 50 years): Tonke Dragt, De brief voor de koning.

- 2005: Guus Kuijer, Het boek van alle dingen, Querido
- 2006: Mireille Geus, Big, Lemniscaat
- 2007: Marjolijn Hof, Een kleine kans, Querido
- 2008: Jan Paul Schutten, Kinderen van Amsterdam, Nieuw Amsterdam
- 2009: Peter Verhelst, Het geheim van de keel van de nachtegaal, De Eenhoorn
- 2010: Daan Remmerts de Vries, Voordat jij er was, Querido
- 2011: Simon van der Geest, Dissus, Querido
- 2012: Bibi Dumon Tak, Winterdieren, Querido
- 2013: Simon van der Geest, Spinder, Querido
- 2014: Jan Paul Schutten, Het raadsel van alles wat leeft – en de stinksokken van Jos Grootjes uit Driel, Gottmer
- 2015: Bette Westera, Doodgewoon, Gottmer
- 2016: Anna Woltz, Gips, Querido
- 2017: Koos Meinderts, Naar het noorden, Hoogland & Van Klaveren
- 2018: Annet Schaap, Lampje, Querido
- 2019: Gideon Samson, Zeb., Leopold
- 2020: Bette Westera, Uit elkaar, Gottmer
- 2021: Pieter Koolwijk, Gozert, Lemniscaat
- 2022: Yorick Goldewijk, Films die nergens draaien, Ploegsma
- 2023: Edward van de Vendel, Misjka, Querido
- 2024: Annejan Mieras, Het kleine heelal
- 2025: Lida Dijkstra, De wonderverteller

== Gouden Penseel ==
- 1973: Margriet Heymans, Hollidee, de circuspony', Lemniscaat
- 1974: Wim Hofman, Koning Wikkepokluk zoekt een rijk, Van Holkema & Warendorf
- 1975: Paul Hulshof, Iolo komt niet spelen, Van Holkema & Warendorf
- 1976: Lidia Postma, Sprookjes en vertellingen van H. C. Andersen, Van Holkema & Warendorf
- 1977: Max Velthuijs, Het goedige monster en de rovers, Dr. W. Junk
- 1978: Thé Tjong-Khing, Wiele wiele stap, Querido

Jan Marinus Verburg, Tom Tippelaar, Querido

- 1979: Tom Eyzenbach, Het wonderlijke verhaal van Hendrik Meier, De Fontein
- 1980: Joke van Leeuwen, Een huis met zeven kamers, Omniboek
- 1981: Piet Klaasse, Sagen en legenden van de Lage Landen, Van Holkema & Warendorf
- 1982: Joost Roelofsz, Voor en achter, Meulenhoff
- 1983: No award
- 1984: Wim Hofman, Aap en beer, Van Holkema & Warendorff
- 1985: Thé Tjong-Khing, Kleine Sofie en Lange Wapper, Querido
- 1986: Max Velthuijs, Klein-Mannetje vindt het geluk, De Vier Windstreken
- 1987: Dieter Schubert, Monkie, Lemniscaat
- 1988: Margriet Heymans, Annetje Lie in het holst van de nacht, Van Holkema & Warendorf
- 1989: Alfons van Heusden, Dat rijmt, Bert Bakker
- 1990: Dick Bruna, Boris Beer, Van Goor
- 1991: Peter Vos, Lieve kinderen hoor mijn lied, De Harmonie
- 1992: Friso Henstra, Waarom niet?, Arion
- 1993: Max Velthuijs, Kikker in de kou, Leopold
- 1994: Jan Jutte, Lui Lei Enzo, Zwijsen
- 1995: Harrie Geelen, Het beertje Pippeloentje, Querido
- 1996: Geerten Ten Bosch, De verjaardag van de eekhoorn, Querido
- 1997: Max Velthuijs, Kikker is Kikker, Leopold
- 1998: Margriet Heymans, De wezen van Woesteland, Querido
- 1999: Annemarie van Haeringen, Malmok, Leopold
- 2000: Annemarie van Haeringen, De prinses met de lange haren, Leopold
- 2001: Jan Jutte, Tien stoute katjes, Leopold
- 2002: Peter van Gestel, Winterijs, De Fontein
- 2003: Thé Tjong-Khing, Het woordenboek van Vos en Haas, Lannoo
- 2004: Jan Jutte, Een muts voor de maan, Leopold
- 2005: Annemarie van Haeringen, Beer is op Vlinder, Leopold
- 2006: Marit Törnqvist, Pikkuhenki, Querido
- 2007: Joke van Leeuwen, Heb je mijn zusje gezien, Querido
- 2008: Charlotte Dematons, Sinterklaas, Lemniscaat
- 2009: Sieb Posthuma, Boven in een groene linde zat een moddervette haan, Gottmer
- 2010: Marije Tolman and Ronald Tolman, De boomhut, Lemniscaat
- 2011: Blexbolex, Seizoenen, Clavis
- 2012: Sieb Posthuma, Een vijver vol inkt, Querido
- 2013: Sylvia Weve, Aan de kant, ik ben je oma niet!, Gottmer
- 2014: Floor Rieder, Het Raadsel van alles wat leeft en de stinksokken van Jos Grootjes uit Driel, Gottmer
- 2015: Alice Hoogstad, Monsterboek, Lemniscaat
- 2016: Harriët van Reek, Lettersoep
- 2017: Martijn van der Linden, Tangramkat
- 2018: Ludwig Volbeda and Floortje Zwigtman, Fabeldieren
- 2019: Yvonne Jagtenberg, Mijn wonderlijke oom
- 2020: Yvonne Jagtenberg, Hup Herman!
- 2021: Ludwig Volbeda, Hele verhalen voor een halve soldaat
- 2022: Raoul Deleo, Terra Ultima
- 2023: Djenné Fila, Een kleine geschiedenis van de mens door dierenogen | Over heilige koeien, ruimteapen en de roep van de kakapo
- 2024: Jeska Verstegen, Het touw en de waarheid
- 2025: Natascha Stenvert, Een ongelofelijk grote, ongelofelijk gevaarlijke leguaan

== Gouden Zoen ==
- 1997: Karlijn Stoffels, Mosje en Reizele, Querido
- 1998: Anne Provoost, De roos en het zwijn, Querido
- 1999: Edward van de Vendel, Gijsbrecht, Querido
- 2000: Edward van de Vendel, De dagen van de bluegrassliefde, Querido
- 2001: Marita de Sterck, Wild vlees, Querido
- 2002: Anne Provoost, De arkvaarders, Querido
- 2003: Isabel Hoving, De gevleugelde kat, Querido
- 2004: Els Beerten, Lopen voor je leven, Querido
- 2005: Benny Lindelauf, Negen open armen, Querido
- 2006: Floortje Zwigtman, Schijnbewegingen, De Fontein
- 2007: Edward van de Vendel, Ons derde lichaam, Querido
- 2008: Jan Simoen, Slecht, Querido

The Gouden Zoen is no longer awarded.
