= Hanni Ehlers =

German translator

- Born: 2 August 1954 (age 72); Eutin, Germany
- Known for: Translation

Hanni Ehlers (born 2 August 1954, Eutin) is a German translator known for translating English and Dutch literature into German.

== Career ==
Ehlers has translated books written by numerous Dutch authors, including Renate Dorrestein, Guus Kuijer, Joke van Leeuwen, Connie Palmen and Els Pelgrom. Other authors include Carli Biessels, Jessica Durlacher, Anna Enquist, Nelleke Noordervliet and Leon de Winter.

In 2006, she received the Else-Otten-Übersetzerpreis for her translation Ganz der Ihre of Connie Palmen's book Geheel de uwe.

In 2013, Dutch author Joke van Leeuwen received the James Krüss Preis für internationale Kinder- und Jugendliteratur for her work together with Ehlers and translator Mirjam Pressler.

== Awards ==
- 2006: Else-Otten-Übersetzerpreis, Ganz der Ihre (German translation of Geheel de uwe by Connie Palmen)
- 2013: James Krüss Preis für internationale Kinder- und Jugendliteratur (together with Joke van Leeuwen and Mirjam Pressler)
