= Polleke =

2003 Dutch family film

- Theatrical release poster
- Directed by: Ineke Houtman
- Written by: Rob Arends; Maarten Lebens
- Based on: Polleke by Guus Kuijer
- Produced by: Hans de Weers
- Starring: Halina Reijn; Liv Stig; Daan Schuurmans; Mamoun Elyounoussi
- Cinematography: Sander Snoep
- Edited by: Michiel Reichwein
- Music by: Vincent van Warmerdam
- Production companies: Egmond Film & Television; VPRO
- Distributed by: United International Pictures
- Release date: 11 October 2003 (Netherlands)
- Running time: 94 minutes
- Country: Netherlands
- Language: Dutch
- Box office: $611,598

Polleke is a 2003 Dutch family film directed by Ineke Houtman and written by Rob Arends and Maarten Lebens, based on the children's book of the same name by Guus Kuijer. It stars Liv Stig, Mamoun Elyounoussi, Halina Reijn and Daan Schuurmans.

It received a Golden Film for 100,000 visitors. The book Camera loopt... Actie! by Bibi Dumon Tak offers a look behind the scenes of making of the film.

== Plot ==
Polleke is an 11 year old girl growing up in an apartment in the big city. Her parents are divorced; her father Spiek lives on the street and is a drug user and her mother is rather eccentric. Polleke falls in love with the neighbor boy across the street, the Moroccan boy Mimoen, but his family does not allow the two to see each other. This leads to a type of Romeo and Juliet situation.

== Cast ==
- Liv Stig as Polleke
- Mamoun Elyounoussi as Mimoen
- Halina Reijn as Tina, Polleke's mother
- Daan Schuurmans as Spiek, Polleke's father
- Frank Lammers as teacher Wouter
- Helmert Woudenberg as Polleke's granddad
- Marja Kok as Polleke's grandmother
- Rosa Boesten as Caro
- Vanessa Coco Morales as Consuelo
- Odin Delver as Tom
- Chaib Massaoudi as Father of Mimoen
- Nuzha Salah as Mother of Mimoen
- Susan Visser as Ina
- Veerle Dobbelaere as Dina
- Mimoun Oaïssa as Hamid
