= Joke van Leeuwen =

Dutch writer, illustrator and performer (born 1952)

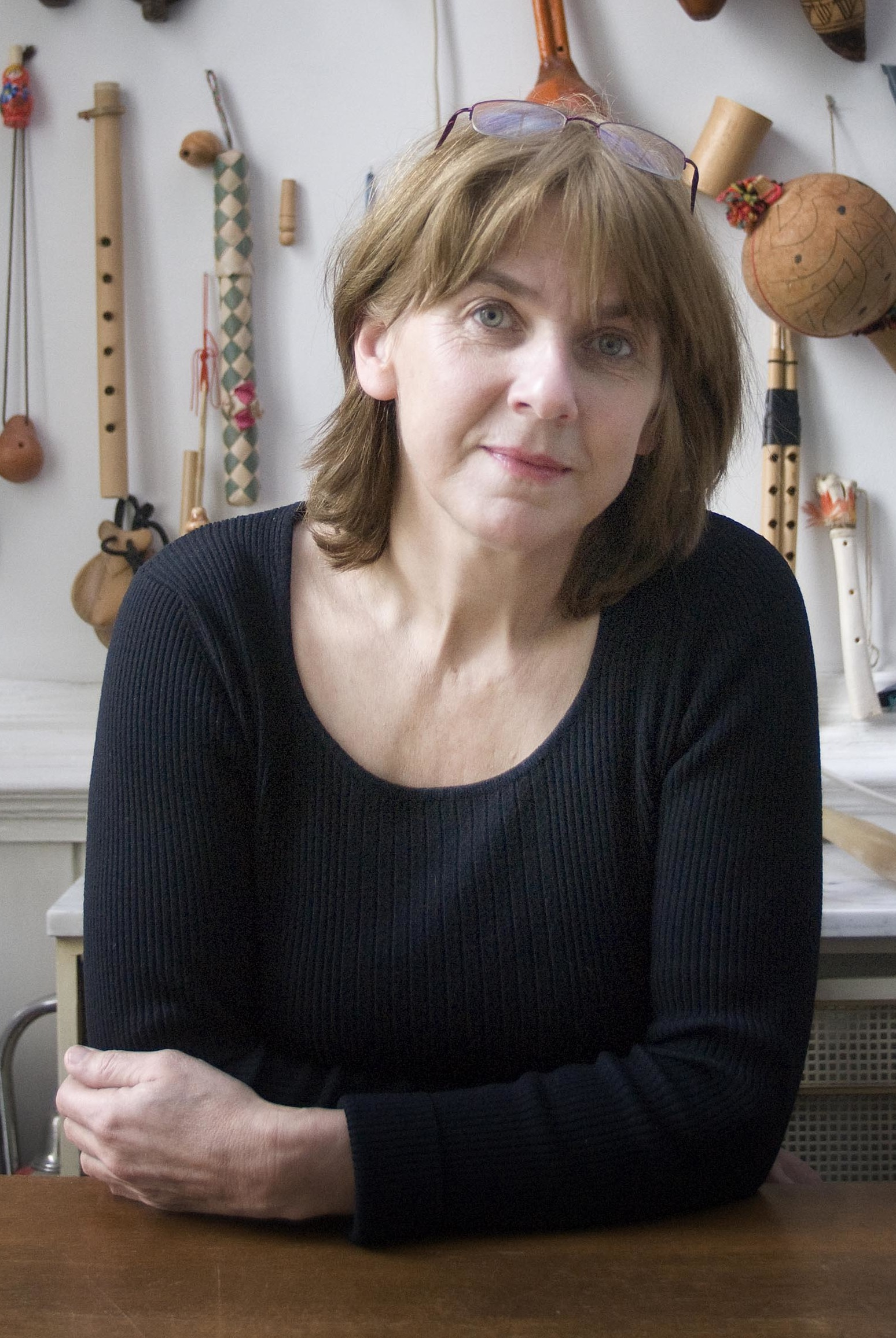
- van Leeuwen in 2008
- Born: Johanna Rutgera van Leeuwen; 24 September 1952 (age 73); The Hague, Netherlands
- Occupation: Author
- Years active: 1992–present
- Website: www.jokevanleeuwen.com

Johanna Rutgera "Joke" van Leeuwen (Dutch pronunciation: [joːˈɦɑnaː rʏtˈxeːraː ˈjoːkə vɑn ˈleːu.ə(n)]; born 24 September 1952) is a Dutch author, illustrator, and cabaret performer.

== Life and career ==
Johanna Rutgera van Leeuwen was born on 24 September 1952 in The Hague, Netherlands. She studied at the University of Brussels and has won various awards for her literature for children which sometimes uses a quest as a theme. Her awards include the Dutch Youth literature award which is only given every three years.

Many of her books have been translated into German by Mirjam Pressler and Hanni Ehlers.

== Awards ==
For oeuvre

- Theo Thijssen-prijs (2000)
- Gouden Ganzenveer (2010)
- Constantijn Huygens Prize (2012)

For individual works

- Gouden Penseel (1980) for Een huis met zeven kamers
- Zilveren Griffel (1980) for Een huis met zeven kamers
- Zilveren Griffel (1982) for De metro van Magnus
- Gouden Griffel (1986) for Deesje
- Zilveren Penseel (1986) for Deesje
- Deutscher Jugendliteraturpreis (1988) for Deesje
- Zilveren Griffel (1989) for We zijn allang begonnen, maar nu begint het echt
- Zilveren Griffel (1993) for Niet wiet, wel nel
- C. Buddingh'-prijs (1995) for Laatste lezers
- Zilveren Griffel (1996) for Ik ben ik
- Golden Owl (1997) for Iep!
- Zilveren Griffel (1997) for Iep!
- Zilveren Griffel (1999) for Kukel
- Zilveren Griffel (2005) for Waarom een buitenboordmotor eenzaam is
- Gouden Penseel (2007) for Heb je mijn zusje gezien?
- Zilveren Griffel (2007) for Heb je mijn zusje gezien?
- Zilveren Penseel (2009) for Een halve hond heel denken
- AKO Literatuurprijs (2013) for Feest van het begin
- Zilveren Griffel (2016) for Mooi boek
- Zilveren Griffel (2018) for Toen ik

== Bibliography ==
- (1978) De Appelmoesstraat is anders (The Apple Sauce Street Is Different)
- (1979) Een huis met zeven kamers (A House With Seven Rooms)
- (1981) De metro van Magnus (The Subway of Magnus)
- (1983) Sus en Jum, 1, 2, 3 (Sus and Jum, 1, 2, 3)
- (1985) Deesje
- (1985) Fien wil een flus (Fien wants a flus)
- (1988) We zijn allang begonnen, maar nu begint het echt (We have already started, but now it really starts)
- (1992) Niet Wiet, wel Nel (Not Wiet, but Nel)
- (1994) Laatste lezers (Last readers)
- (1995) Ik ben ik (I am me)
- (1996) Iep! (Eep!)
- (1998) Kukel
- (2004) Waarom een buitenboordmotor eenzaam is (Why an outboard motor is lonely)
- (2006) Heb je mijn zusje gezien? (Have you seen my sister)
- (2008) Een halve hond heel denken (Thinking half a dog whole)
- (2012) Feest van het begin (Feast of the beginning)
- (2015) De onervarenen (The unexperienced)
- (2015) Mooi boek (Beautiful book)
- (2017) Toen ik (When I)
