= Theo Thijssen-prijs =

Dutch literary award

- Awarded for: Oeuvre of children's literature or young adult fiction author
- Country: Netherlands
- First award: 1988
- Website: https://literatuurmuseum.nl/literatuurprijzen/theo-thijssen-prijs

The Theo Thijssen-prijs (Note: Sometimes spelled Theo Thijssenprijs.) (Dutch for Theo Thijssen Prize) is a Dutch literary award awarded once every three years to a Dutch author of children's literature or young adult fiction. The award is not given for a particular work, but for the entire oeuvre. The award is named after Dutch writer, teacher and socialist politician Theo Thijssen. The winner of the prize receives €60,000 and a small replica of a statue of Theo Thijssen by Hans Bayens.

The Theo Thijssen-prijs is a continuation of the literary award Staatsprijs voor kinder-en jeugdliteratuur (Dutch for State prize for children's and youth literature) which was first awarded in 1964. The award ceremony is held in the Dutch Museum of Literature in The Hague. The award is awarded by the Stichting P.C. Hooft-prijs voor Letterkunde.

== Winners ==
=== Staatsprijs voor kinder- en jeugdliteratuur ===
- 1964: Annie M. G. Schmidt
- 1967: An Rutgers van der Loeff-Basenau
- 1970: Miep Diekmann
- 1973: Paul Biegel
- 1976: Tonke Dragt
- 1979: Guus Kuijer
- 1982: Henk Barnard
- 1985: Not awarded

=== Theo Thijssen-prijs ===
- 1988: Willem Wilmink
- 1991: Wim Hofman
- 1994: Els Pelgrom
- 1997: Toon Tellegen
- 2000: Joke van Leeuwen
- 2003: Imme Dros
- 2006: Peter van Gestel
- 2009: Ted van Lieshout
- 2012: Sjoerd Kuyper
- 2015: Martha Heesen
- 2018: Bibi Dumon Tak
- 2021: Daan Remmerts de Vries
- 2024: Edward van de Vendel
