= Jenny Dalenoord =

Dutch painter and illustrator

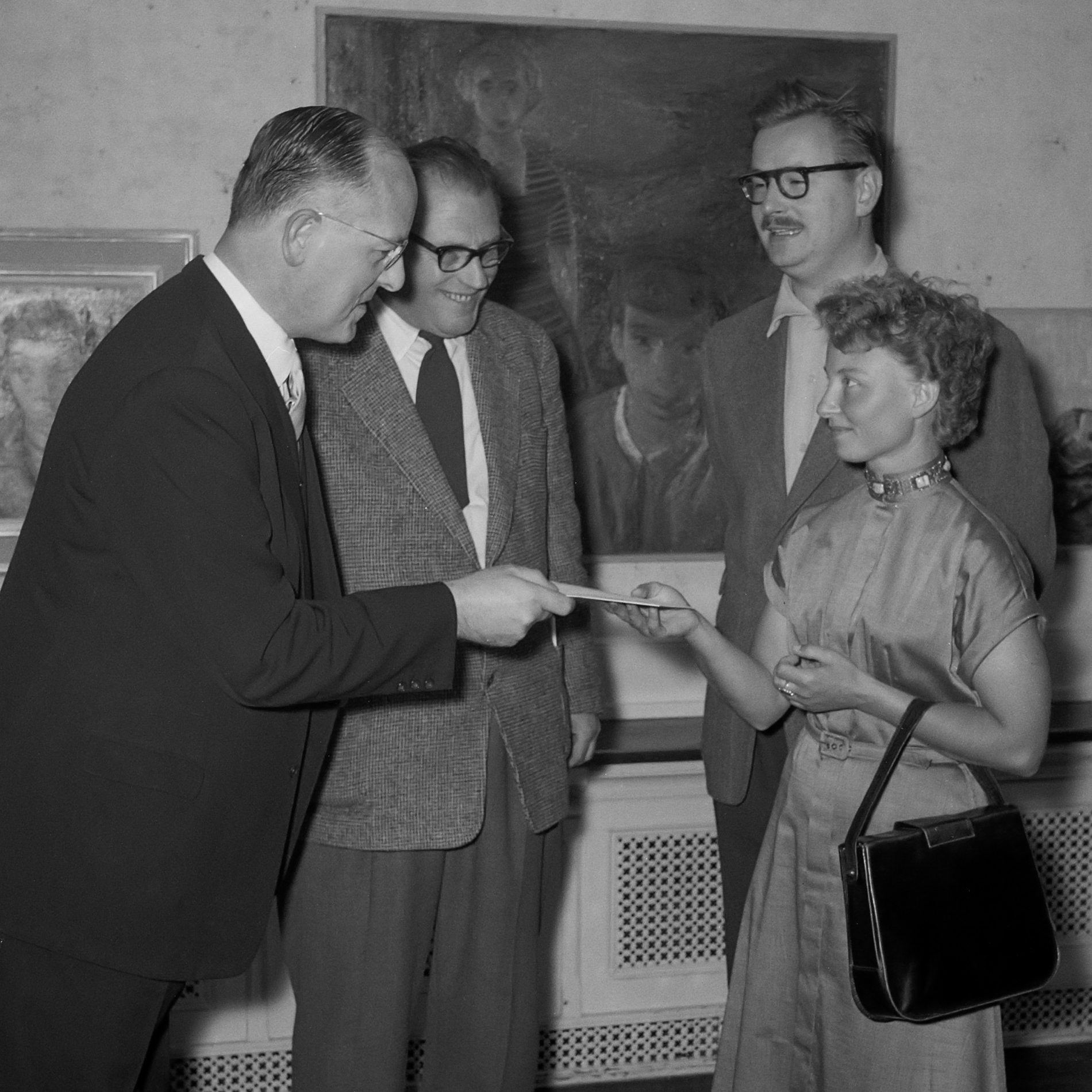
Jenny Dalenoord receives the Jacob Maris Award (1955)

Jenny Johanna Dalenoord (17 June 1918 – 25 October 2013) was a Dutch illustrator, graphic designer, watercolorist and cartoon artist. Dalenoord illustrated more than 180 children's books throughout her career.

== Early life ==
Dalenoord was born in Cirebon, Dutch East Indies, in 1918.

== Works ==
Some of her most notable works include the illustrations for works by Siny van Iterson, for "Wiplala" by Annie M. G. Schmidt in 1957, "Padu is gek" by Miep Diekmann in 1957, and "Gideons reizen" by Anna Rutgers van der Loeff in 1960. Dalenoord and Schmidt shared the prize for "Best Children's Book" in 1957 for their work on "Wiplala". She also illustrated Dutch children's magazines, including Jippo, Okki, and Kris Kras.

In addition to her work in children's literature, Dalenoord designed a series of children's postage stamps in 1952.

In 1982, Dalenoord was awarded the Zilveren Penseel (Silver Prize) for her work on "Muis, Mol en Rat."

== Death ==
She died in Soest, Netherlands, on 25 October 2013, at the age of 95.
