= Leonie Kooiker =

Dutch children's writer (1927–2020)

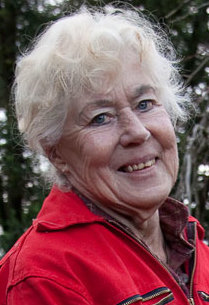

Leonie Kooiker (20 October 1927 – 16 April 2020) was a Dutch children's writer. She was born in Markelo, Netherlands. She published for the children's magazine Kris Kras. Her first book (Het malle ding van bobbistiek)), won her the Gouden Griffel. Her book Het Oerlanderboek won her the Vlag en Wimpel award.

Kooiker died in Papendrecht, Netherlands on 16 April 2020, aged 92.

== Bibliography ==
- 1970 Het malle ding van bobbistiek (Gouden Griffel), Ploegsma
- 1972 De boevenvangers, Ploegsma
- 1972 De diamant van de piraat, Ploegsma
- 1972 Het laantje met de lindeboom, Lemniscaat
- 1973 De dochter van de schilder op de berg, Ploegsma
- 1974 De heksensteen, Ploegsma
- 1974 Je hart of je heerlijkheid (streekroman), Bigot en van Rossum
- 1976 Het levende beeld in de tempel, Ploegsma
- 1979 Het oerlanderboek, Ploegsma
- 1981 Tante Mien, Leopold
- 1982 Ga niet te ver, je valt eraf, Zwijsen
- 1982 Je mag een poosje los (6+), Zwijsen
- 1982 Dan liever de lucht in, Leopold
- 1982 Met de grote vogel mee, Terra
- 1983 De zwarte bende (zoeklicht), Zwijsen
- 1983 Je kunt het niet meenemen, Leopold
- 1983 Het woekerkoraal, Leopold
- 1984 De maanlandexpres, Leopold
- 1984 De kleine dief, Ploegsma
- 1985 Bang in bed (6+), Zwijsen
- 1986 Bommen in de grond, Leopold
- 1987 Ik zit hier te schrijven (met anderen), Leopold
- 1988 De temponauten, Leopold
- 1989 Roel en de rode kwalkop, Leopold
- 1989 Het stampen van de slang, Leopold
- 1990 Een sponsor voor de boys, Dijkstra
- 1990 Een boze meneer (6+), Zwijsen
- 1990 De kinderen van de Esborgh (vijf delen), Malmberg
- 1991 De wensballonnen, Zwijsen
- 1992 Een barre berentocht (prentenboek), La Rivière en Voorhoeve
- 1992 Het wrede vuur (zoeklicht), Zwijsen
- 1993 Wát zei het prinsesje? (6+), Zwijsen
- 1993 Een gulden voor grootvader zon (zoeklicht), Zwijsen
- 1994 Grimnir met de dorre hand (zoeklicht), Zwijsen
- 1994 De enge onderneming van meneer Ondertak, Ploegsma
- 1995 Pas op voor de buurvrouw (zoeklicht), Zwijsen
- 1995 Stiekem verhuizen (6+), Zwijsen
- 1995 Een bal van goud (prentenboek), Ploegsma
- 1995 Het tijgeroog, Ploegsma
- 1996 Het woekerkoraal (herzien), Ploegsma
- 1996 Een liefdesdrank voor Cindy (zoeklicht), Zwijsen
- 1997 De trollenval (4-6), Ploegsma
- 1997 Het neveneffect, Ploegsma
- 1997 De steen van de pentapoden, Ploegsma
- 1997 Het spookt op school (zoeklicht), Zwijsen
- 1997 Het huis op zolder, Zwijsen
- 1998 Bonzo past op het huis (6+), Zwijsen
- 1998 Zet je heksenhoed op en vlieg, Zwijsen
- 1999 De leedwezens, Ploegsma
- 2000 In de schuur van opa, Zwijsen
- 2000 De kraak, Ploegsma
- 2001 Lieve Marsman, Zwijsen
- 2001 De jungle van S. van Es, Zwijsen
- 2004 Opgesloten in school (7/8), Zwijsen
- 2005 Ouders kun je niet kiezen (leesleeuw), Zwijsen
- 2006 De grote boze wolf (groep 3), Zwijsen
- 2006 Een gevaarlijk geheim (leesleeuw), Zwijsen
- 2007 Kippenvriend, Zwijsen
- 2008 de Koppendans
- 2008 3 vrienden – DVD
- 2008 The Fairy Travelers
- 2009 3 vrienden – Boek
- 2010 7×7 Dieren (Kleur & Zwart/Wit) geïllustreerd
- 2010 De Koppendans, een jonge vrouw kiest voor Afrika
- 2010 De Zeeroverhoofdvrouw
