= Henk Barnard =

Dutch writer, journalist and television director

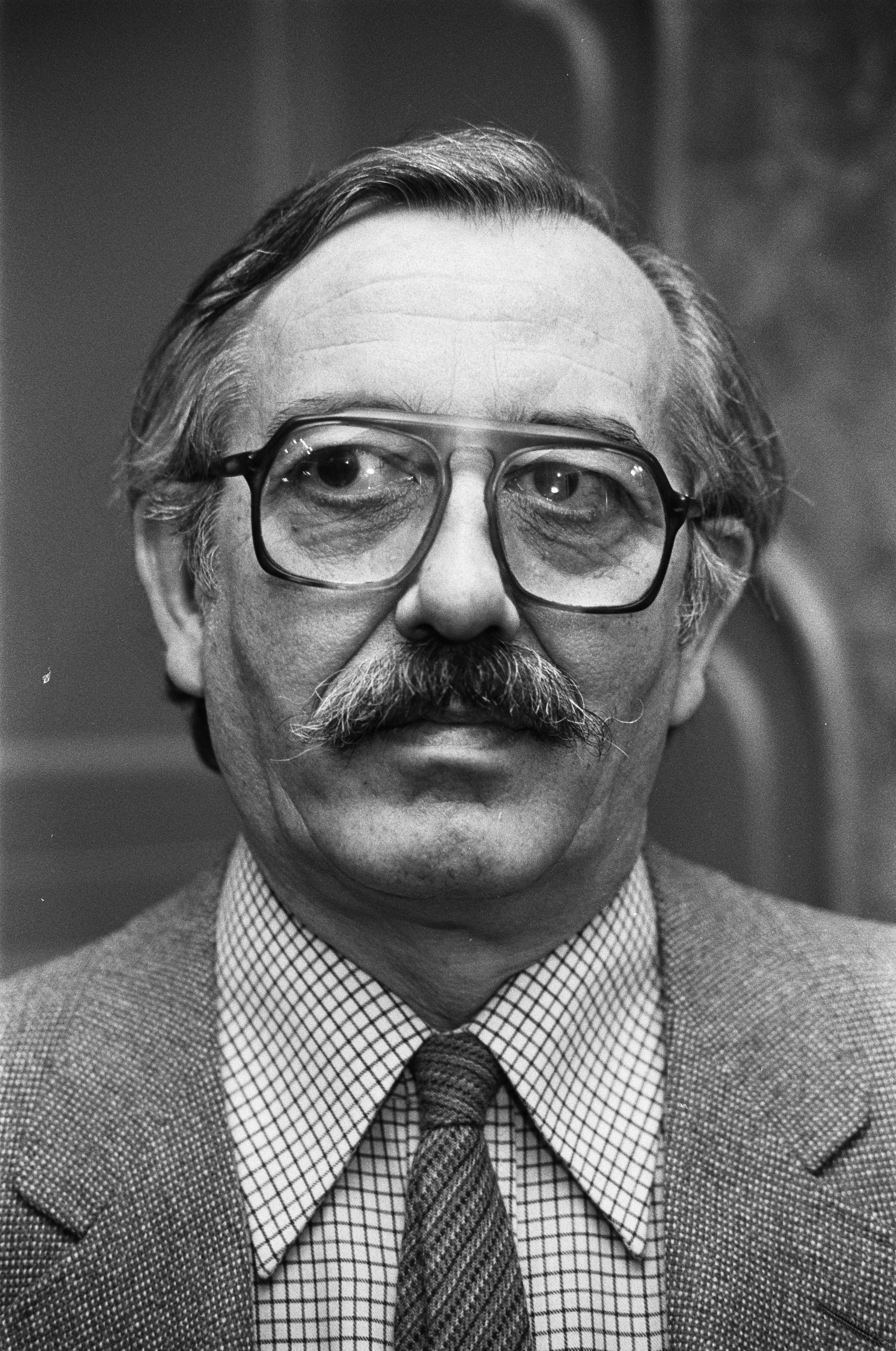
- Henk Barnard (1979)
- Born: 8 August 1922; Rotterdam, Netherlands
- Died: 16 April 2003 (aged 80); Laren, Netherlands
- Occupation: Writer
- Writing career
- Language: Dutch
- Notable awards: Gouden Griffel 1973 1977; Nienke van Hichtum-prijs 1979; Staatsprijs voor kinder- en jeugdliteratuur 1982

Henk Barnard (8 August 1922 – 16 April 2003) was a Dutch writer of children's literature, journalist and television director.

== Career ==
He was born in Rotterdam. Between 1960 and 1962 Barnard worked as a television director for the television series Pipo en het zingende zwaard and Pipo in Kaliefland. Barnard also worked on the series De proemel (1962) and Ja zuster, nee zuster between 1966 and 1968.

In 1972, Barnard published the children's book De Marokkaan en de kat van tante Da (1972) for which he received the Gouden Griffel award a year later. Barnard was also awarded the Gouden Griffel for his book Kon Hesi Baka / Kom gauw terug. For his book Laatste nacht in Jeque Barnard received the Nienke van Hichtum-prijs in 1979.

In 1974, Barnard wrote 2 is te veel, the Kinderboekenweekgeschenk on the occasion of the Boekenweek.

For his contributions to children's literature, he received the Staatsprijs voor kinder- en jeugdliteratuur in 1982.

Barnard's books were illustrated by his wife Reintje Venema and Fiel van der Veen.

He died 16 April 2003 in Laren.

== Awards ==
- 1973: Gouden Griffel, De Marokkaan en de kat van tante Da
- 1977: Gouden Griffel, Kon Hesi Baka / Kom gauw terug
- 1979: Nienke van Hichtum-prijs, Laatste nacht in Jeque
- 1982: Staatsprijs voor kinder- en jeugdliteratuur
