= Reinier Sonneveld =

Dutch writer and theologian

Reinier Sonneveld (1978, The Netherlands) is a Dutch writer of non-fiction and novels (mostly for children).

== Life ==
Reinier Sonneveld grew up in a multi-ethnic family, with two siblings of African descent. In 1996, he began studying theology at a small university in Kampen, the Netherlands, while also studying screenwriting in Hilversum. In 2003 he settled as an independent writer of essays, articles and books about progressive themes, and later on also many stories: a graphic novel, a thriller novel and children's books.

In 2012 he had sold more than 250,000 copies, qualifying him as a beststelling author in the Netherlands. In Reli Detox (2022) he argued how religious manipulation works, how it can be dismantled and how victims can heal. In Het einde van de hel (The End of Hell) he argued for universalism and a reconciliation of all living beings. The book was heavily debated and critized by conservatives and won the Prize for the Best Theology Book in 2025.

In 2026 he started the Onsteden-series (Uncity-series) for the publisher Lemniscaat, a series for children (9-13) about 'uncities': places on the edge of existence. Part 1 is De geheimen van Sterrenstad (The Secrets of Star City) and is set in Star City near Moscow during the Cold War. Part 2 is De schat van Schimmenstad (The Treasure of Ghost Town) and is set in a 'ghost town' in China.

Themes of Reinier Sonneveld in these children's books are: the love for animals, the power of stories, and the resilience of children.

== Books (selection) ==
=== Fiction ===
- Jakob Kusdrager ('Jacob the Kiss Courier', picture book drawn by Tirza Beekhuis), 2011 ISBN 9789460050114
- Het lied van de vlinder ('The Song of the Butterfly', graphic novel drawn by Heina Dokter), 2019 ISBN 9789460050558
- De hoogvlieger ('The High Flyer', thriller), 2023 ISBN 9789460050718
- De geheimen van Sterrenstad ('The Secrets of Star City', Onsteden 1), 2026 ISBN 9789047718499
- De schat van Schimmenstad ('The Treasure of Ghost Town', Onsteden 2), 2026 ISBN 9789047718802

=== Non-fiction ===
- Reli Detox: Genezen van religieuze manipulatie ('Reli Detox: Recovery from Religious Manipulation'), 2022 ISBN 9789463691963
- Taal-EHBO: De schrijfgids voor duidelijke en overtuigende teksten ('Word-911 for Clear and Convincing Writing'), 2024 ISBN 9789058042224
- Het einde van de hel: Waarom niemand wordt afgeschreven ('The End of Hell: Why No One is Written Off'), 2025 ISBN 9789043542326
- Klik: Betere gesprekken, dieper contact ('Click: Better Conversations, Deeper Connection'), 2026 ISBN 9789043542340
