= Fiel van der Veen =

Dutch illustrator (born 1945)

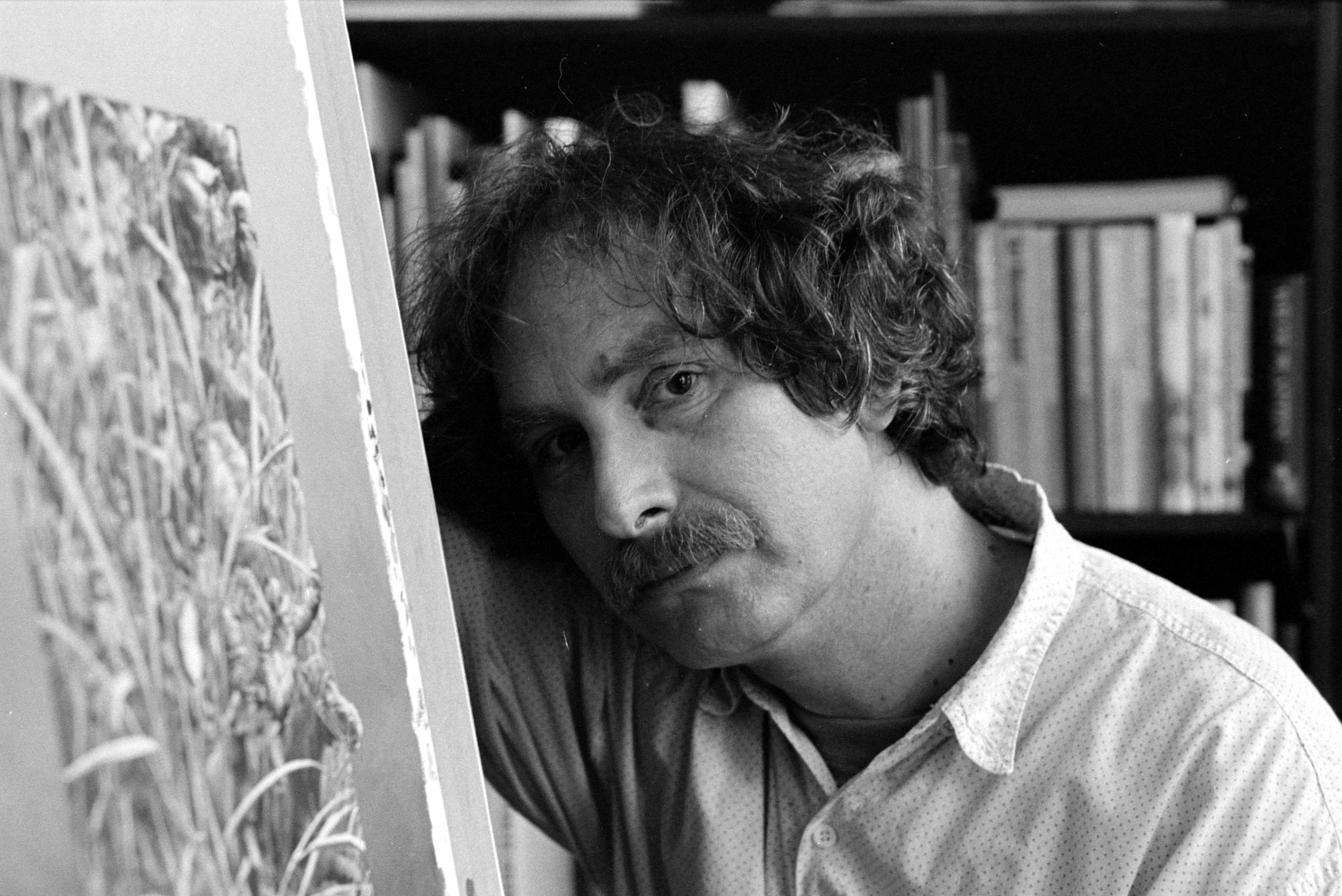
- Fiel van der Veen, 1993
- Born: Theophile M. van der Veen; 18 February 1945 (age 81); Nijmegen
- Known for: Illustration

Fiel van der Veen (born 18 February 1945, Nijmegen) is a Dutch illustrator.

== Career ==
Van der Veen has illustrated books by various Dutch authors, including Paul Biegel, Jan Terlouw and Willem Wilmink.

In 1974, Van der Veen illustrated the book 2 is te veel by Henk Barnard, the Kinderboekenweekgeschenk on the occasion of the Boekenweek. Van der Veen also illustrated Paul Biegel's book Het eiland daarginds which was the Kinderboekenweekgeschenk in 1989.

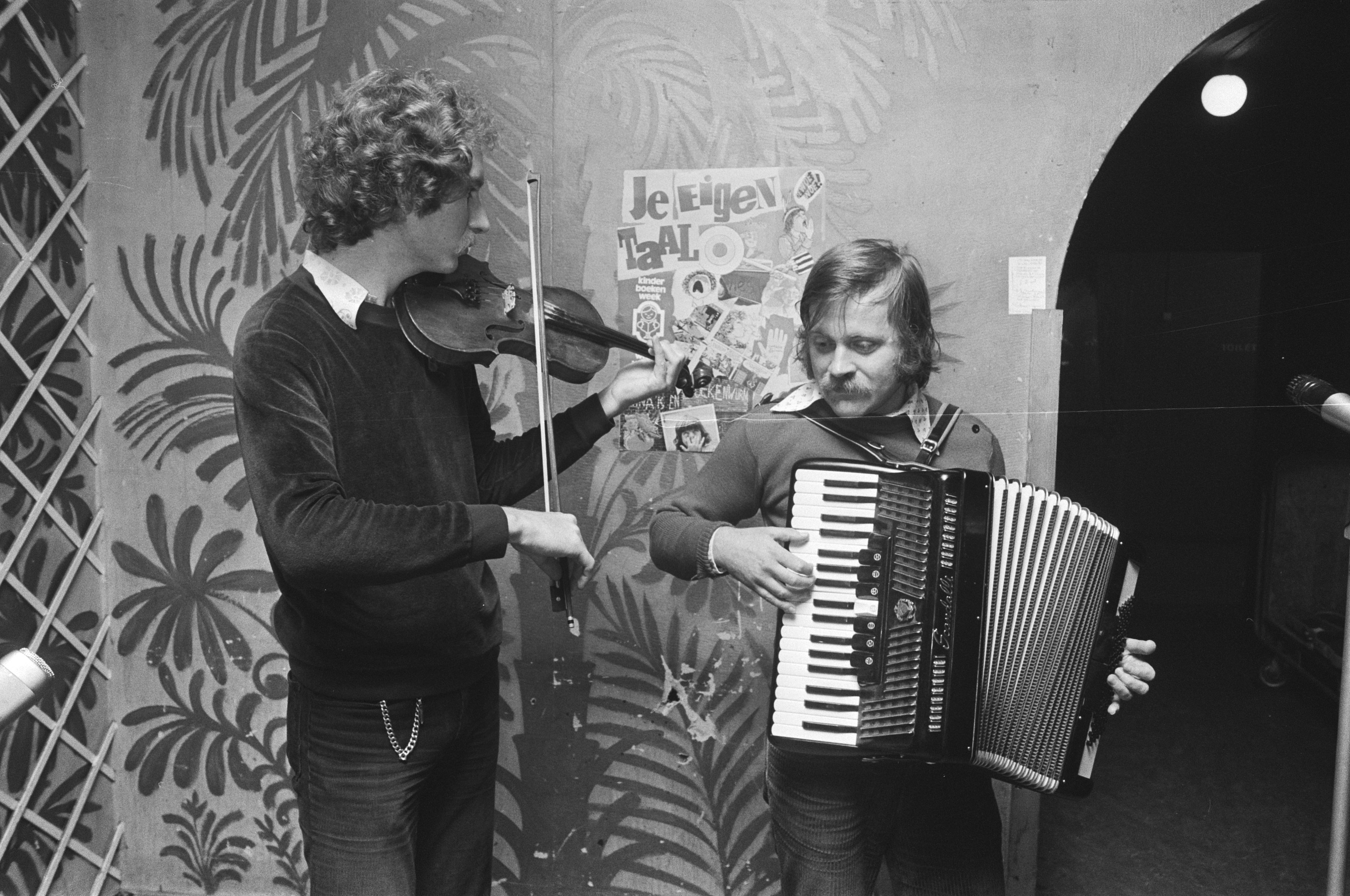
Van der Veen (violin) and Wilmink (1976)

In 1988, van der Veen won the Zilveren Penseel for his illustrations in Paul Biegel's book De rode prinses. Biegel's book Laatste verhalen van de eeuw, also illustrated by van der Veen, won the Woutertje Pieterse Prijs in 2000. Other books by Biegel that were illustrated by van der Veen include Japie en het zwarte spook (2002), Man en muis (2003) and De roep van de Kinkhoorn (2004).

== Awards ==
- 1988: Zilveren Penseel (De rode prinses, written by Paul Biegel)
- 1988: NIC Illustratie Jaarprijs (De rode prinses, written by Paul Biegel)
- 1997: NIC Illustratie Jaarprijs (De zwerftochten van Aeneas, written by Paul Biegel)
