= Gorps =

Gorps may refer to:

- Gorps (aliens), aliens in the television series Astro Farm
- Gorps (creatures), creatures in the novel series The War Against the Chtorr
- Gorps (musician), a musician in the band Pfuri Gorps & Kniri

== See also ==
- Gorp (disambiguation)
- Gorping
