= Siny van Iterson =

Dutch writer (1919–2018)

Siny van Iterson (5 October 1919 – 7 August 2018) was a Dutch children's writer, whose work was recognised with several awards, including Children's Book of the Year in 1968, a Gouden Griffel and a nomination for the Hans Christian Andersen Award.

== Biography ==
Van Iterson was born on Curaçao on 5 October 1919 to Dutch parents. She moved to the Netherlands at the age of two, but returned to Curaçao in 1947. In 1958 she moved with her husband to Colombia. She wrote exclusively in the Dutch language, although several titles have been translated into Danish, German and English. She often collaborated with illustrator Jenny Dalenoord. Her first two novels were set in Curaçao, whilst others were set in different South American locations. Her final novel was published in 1982. She died on 7 August 2018 in The Hague. According to the scholar Ronald Jobe, van Iterson's novels showed a "contemporary view of rural Colombia" as well as providing "commentary on the poverty" found in the country.

== Awards and recognition ==
- The title De adjudant van de vrachtwagen (The Adjutant of the Truck) was awarded as Children's Book of the Year in 1968. In English translation the title changed to Pulga.
- In 1971 she received a Gouden Griffel for Het gouden suikerriet (The Golden Sugar Cane).
- In 1972 van Iterson was nominated for the Hans Christian Andersen Award.
- In 1973 the English translation of Pulga won the Mildred L. Batchelder Award for the most outstanding children's book translated into English.

== Selected works ==
- Schaduw over Chocamata (1953)
- In de ban van de duivelsklip (1954)
- De adjudant van de vrachtwagen (1967)
- Het gouden suikerriet (1970)
