= Star City, Russia =

Area in Zvyozdny gorodok, Moscow Oblast, Russia

Coordinates: 55.8806°N 38.1105°E

Location in Russia
Location in Moscow Oblast

Star City (Russian: Звёздный городок, romanized: Zvyozdny gorodok, lit. 'starry townlet') is an area in Zvyozdny gorodok, Moscow Oblast, Russia, which has since the 1960s been home to the Yuri Gagarin Cosmonaut Training Center (GCTC). Officially, the area was known as "closed military townlet No. 1" and at various times had also been designated as Shchyolkovo-14 (Щёлково-14) and Zvyozdny (Звёздный).

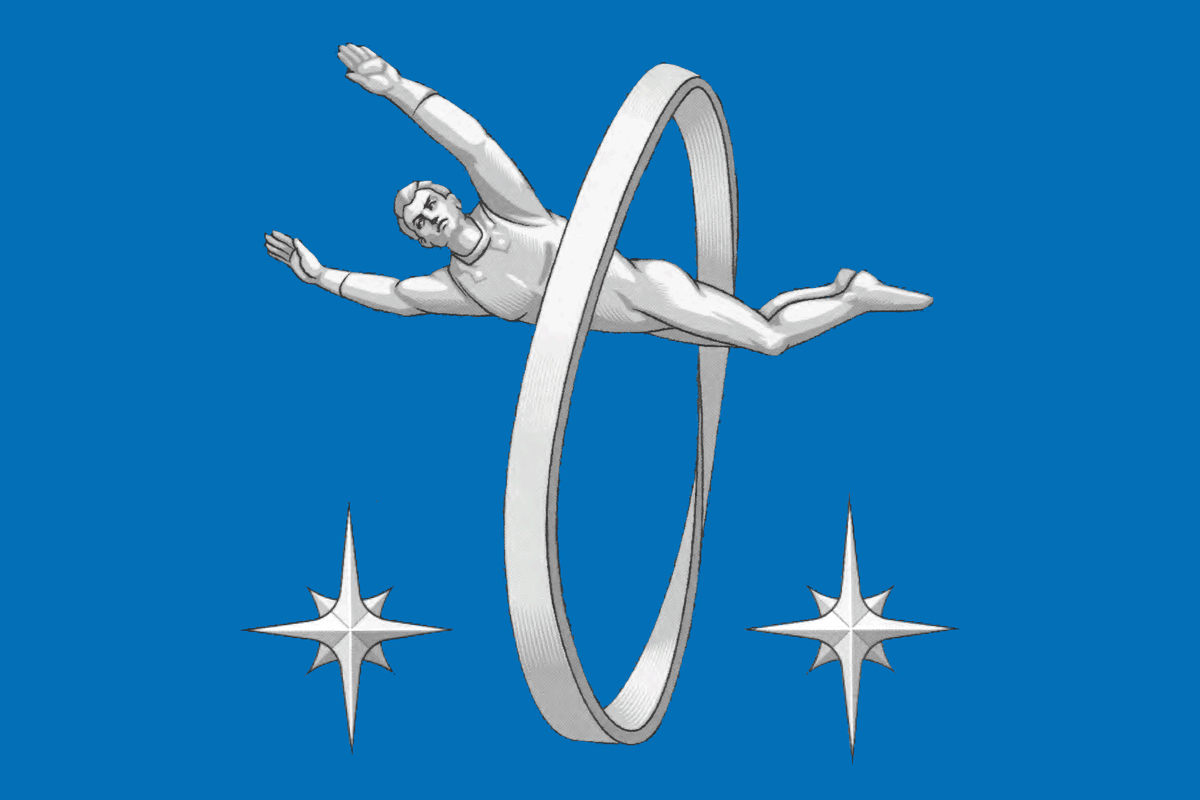
Flag

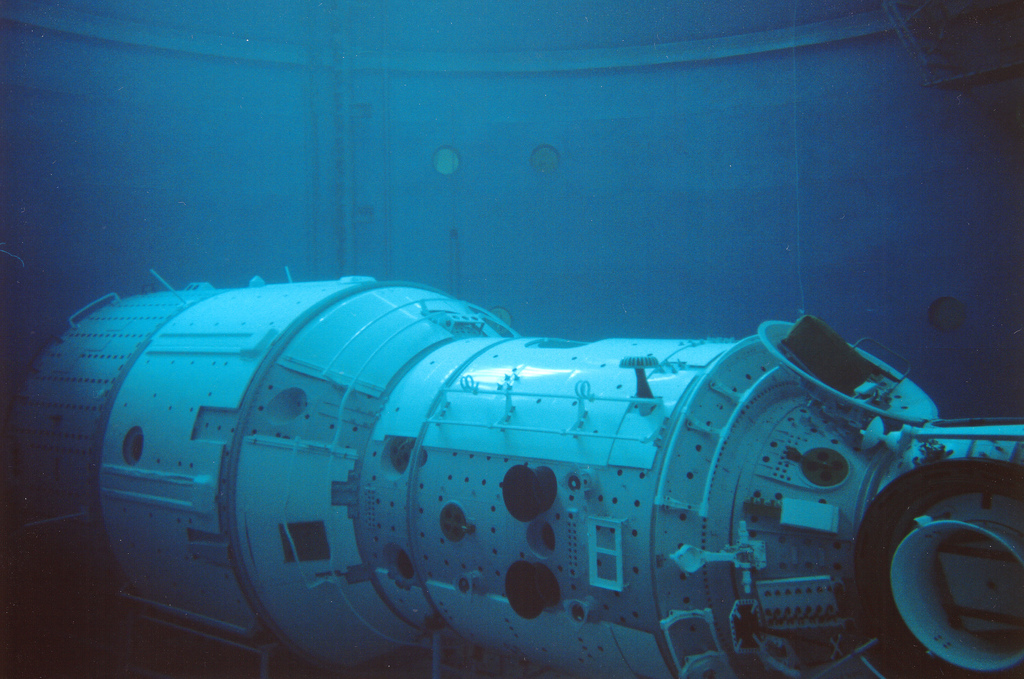
Mir mockup in the training center pool

== Overview ==
=== History ===
Members of today’s Roscosmos Cosmonaut Corps and the Soviet space program before it have lived and trained in Star City since the 1960s. In the Soviet era the location was a highly secret and guarded military installation, access to which was severely restricted. Many Russian cosmonauts, past and present, and Training Centre's personnel, live in Star City with their families. The facility has its own post office, high school, shops, child day care/kindergarten, movie theater, sports and recreation facilities, railway station, and a museum of space travel and human exploration. Air transportation is available through nearby Chkalovsky Air Base.

In the summer 1990, American "Youth Science Ambassadors" sponsored by People to People International were hosted at Star City where they were treated to a presentation by cosmonaut Anatoly Artsebarsky. In the mid- to late 1990s, groups of select students from high school in Star City participated in the Russian American Cultural Exchange Program (RACE). Students first hosted, then visited, American counterparts attending five high schools in the United States.

There is a statue of the "space dog" Laika, the first animal to orbit the Earth, in Star City.

== Transportation ==
Transportation needs are met by the no. 380 bus route and taxis that stop near the border checkpoints, and by a railway station located at a short walking distance.

== Incorporation ==
For most of its history, the space training center was in jurisdiction of the Soviet and then Russian military. However, in August 1996, due to the changes in legislation the center became subordinated both to the Ministry of Defense and to the Russian Space Agency (now Roscosmos). This double status remained in effect until October 1, 2008, when the center was re-organized and subordinated directly and solely to the by-then-renamed Russian Federal Space Agency. As a result, the status of the territory of Star City was changed from military to civil, and the territory itself was incorporated as a closed administrative-territorial formation of Zvyozdny gorodok. Within the closed formation, the territory was organized on June 16, 2009 as an inhabited locality with the status of a work settlement. A proposal to officially name the work settlement as Zvyozdny gorodok was submitted to the federal government on October 29, 2009, but as of 2011 had not yet been officially approved.

== NASA in Star City ==
The "Prophylactory" (aka the "Prophy"), was a three-floor dormitory built by the Soviets to house Americans during the Apollo–Soyuz Project. NASA leased the second floor for team housing and for the office of the Director of Operations, Russia. NASA also built several duplexes for housing, during the Shuttle–Mir program.

NASA flight surgeon Michael Barratt stated during an oral history interview in 1998, "Star City has always been kind of felt as the forbidden city or the hidden city. It wasn't on any maps, certainly, by then. It was a secret cosmonaut training base. Of course, everyone knew where it was, but it was considered a closed and secure city".

== In popular culture ==
- Both the Apple TV series For All Mankind and its spinoff series Star City depict the town in an alternate history of the Space Race, one where the Soviet Union manages to land the first man on the Moon.
- Two Sides of the Moon David Scott and Alexei Leonov (2004) provides a firsthand account of the very creation of Star City in the early 1960s, describing it as a wilderness that was rapidly transformed into a secret, self-contained military town.
- The Secrets of Star City by Reinier Sonneveld is a children's novel set in the Cold War, that follows a young son of a cosmonaut in Star City.
- Starman: The Truth Behind the Legend of Yuri Gagarin by Jamie Doran & Piers Bizony features heavily the Yuri Gagarin Cosmonaut Training Center in Star City.

== Notable residents ==
- Yuri Gagarin
