= Jan Paul Schutten =

Dutch writer of children's literature

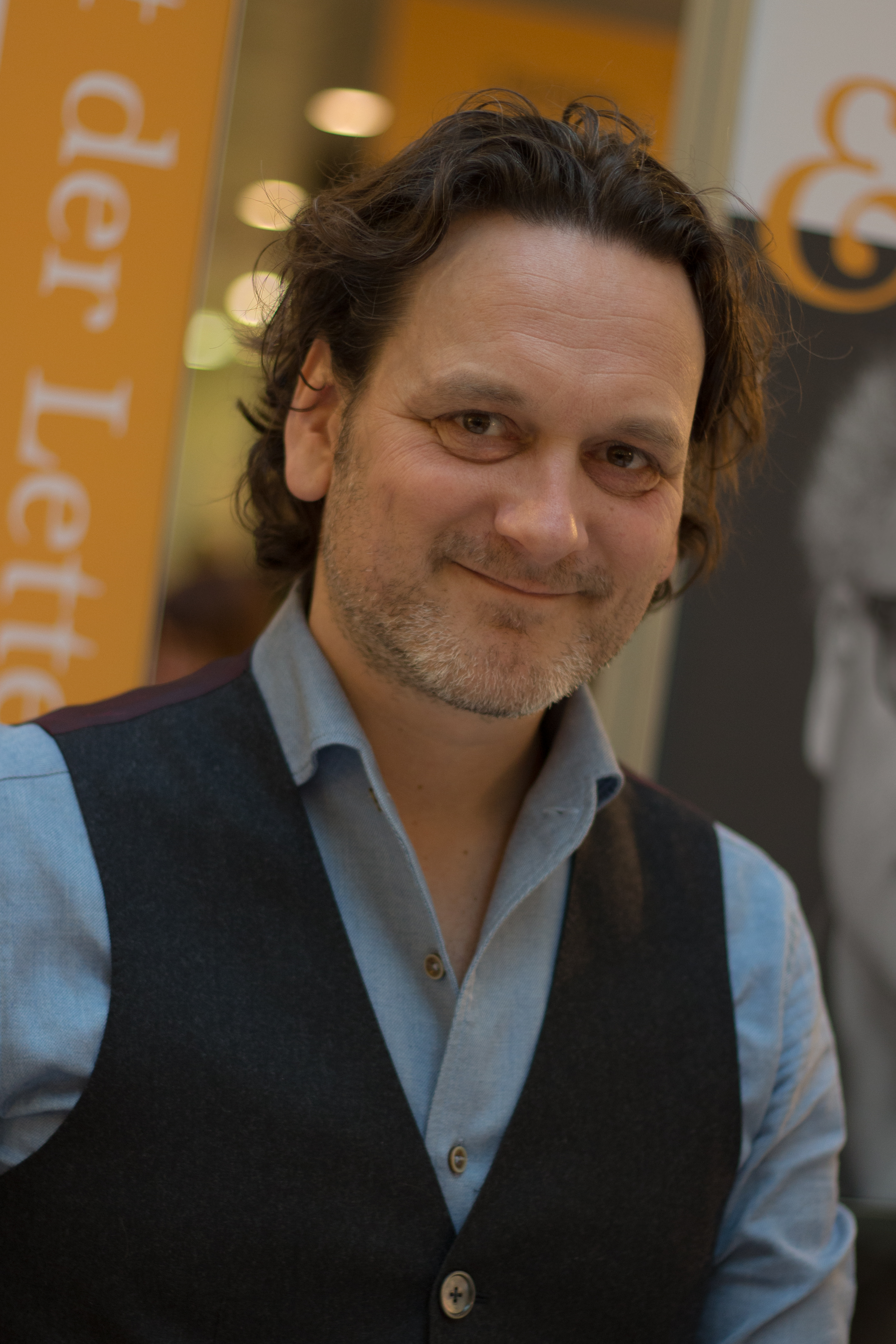
- Jan Paul Schutten (2015)
- Born: 30 November 1970 (age 54); Vlissingen, Netherlands
- Occupation: Writer
- Language: Dutch
- Notable awards: Gouden Griffel 2008 2014; Nienke van Hichtum-prijs 2013

Jan Paul Schutten (born 30 November 1970) is a Dutch writer of children's literature.

== Career ==
Schutten's debut book Ruik eens wat ik zeg, de taal van dieren en planten was awarded in 2004 with the Vlag en Wimpel award. The book was illustrated by Sieb Postuma.

In 2008, Schutten received the Gouden Griffel award for his book Kinderen van Amsterdam with illustrations by Paul Teng. In the following year, Schutten wrote the book De wraak van het spruitje, the Kinderboekenweekgeschenk on the occasion of the annual Boekenweek.

Schutten won the Nienke van Hichtum-prijs in 2013 for his book Het raadsel van alles wat leeft. He also won his second Gouden Griffel award for this book in 2014. The book was illustrated by Floor Rieder who won the Gouden Penseel award for her illustrations in 2014. The book also marked Rieder's debut as children's book illustrator.

Schutten won another Vlag en Wimpel award in 2012 for his book Groeten uit 2030!.

== Personal life ==
Schutten is married to Bibi Dumon Tak who is also an award-winning writer of Dutch children's literature.

== Awards ==
- 2004: Vlag en Wimpel, Ruik eens wat ik zeg, de taal van dieren en planten
- 2008: Gouden Griffel, Kinderen van Amsterdam
- 2012: Vlag en Wimpel, Groeten uit 2030!
- 2013: Nienke van Hichtum-prijs, Het raadsel van alles wat leeft
- 2014: Gouden Griffel, Het raadsel van alles wat leeft
- 2019: Zilveren Griffel, Het mysterie van niks en oneindig veel snot
