= Wim Hofman =

Dutch writer

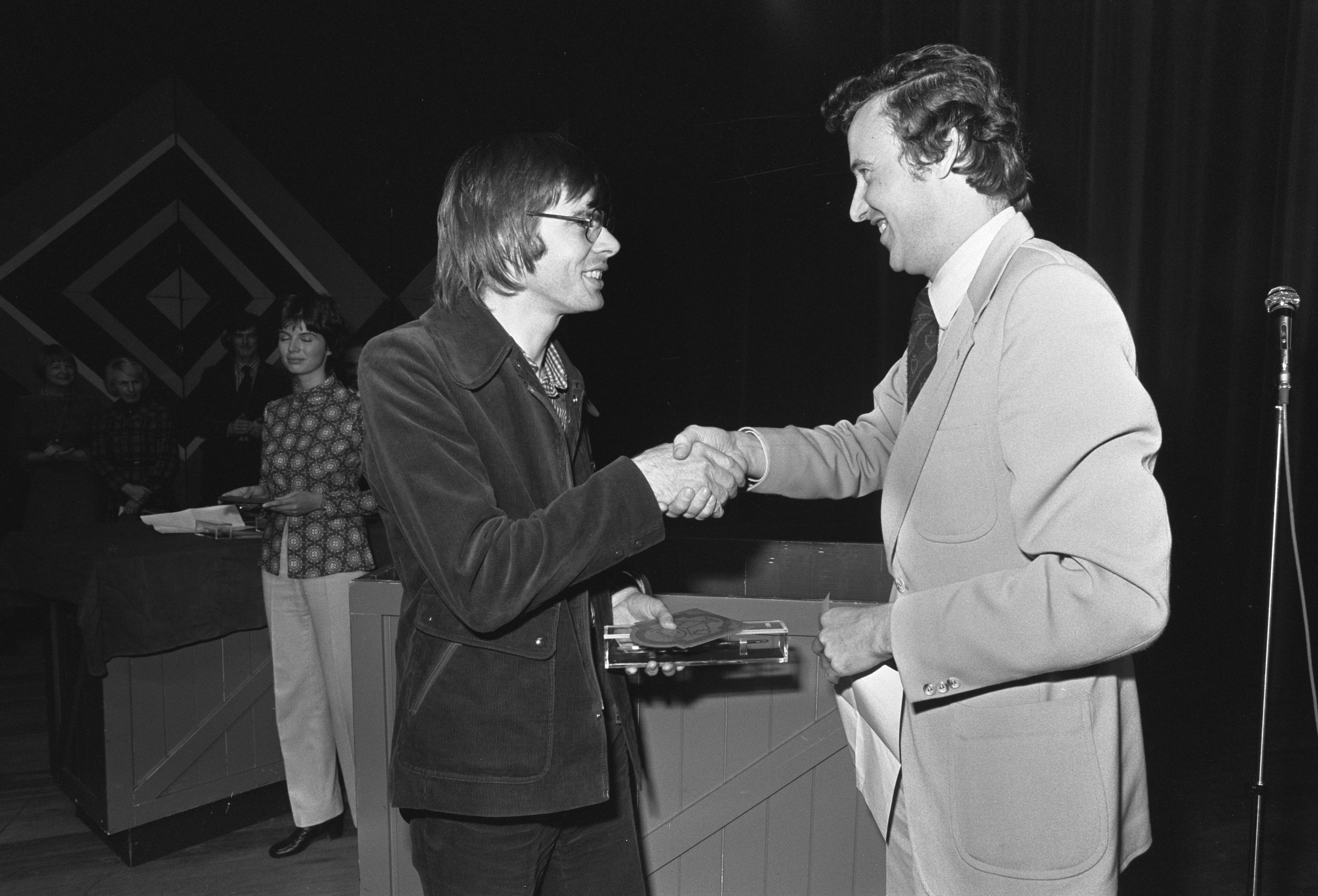
- Hofman receives the Gouden Penseel in 1974
- Born: February 2, 1941; Oostkapelle, Netherlands
- Spouse: Toke Hofman-Mertens
- Children: Maarten Hofman, Machteld Irons-Hofman
- Writing career
- Genres: Children's literature, poetry, drama
- Notable works: Het Vlot, Zwart als Inkt, A Good Hiding
- Notable awards: Gouden Griffel, Gouden Penseel, Nienke van Hichtum-prijs, Theo Thijssen-prijs, Max Velthuijs-prijs

Wim Hofman (Oostkapelle, February 2, 1941) is a Dutch author. After elementary school he joined the seminary in Sterksel, because he wanted to become a missionary. He started writing books early, and published his first novel, "Welwel, de zeer grote tovenaar & zes andere doldwaze verhalen over ridders, tovenaars, matrozen, krentenbollen, cowboys, indianen & over een planeet" in 1969. On February 2, 1970, he married Toke Mertens and moved to Vlissingen, where he still lives. He has two children. Wim Hofman also illustrates his own books, and paints. He won awards for a number of his books.

== Notable Books ==
Wim Hofman wrote a large number of books. Some of the important ones are described here. A number of his books have been translated into German, but only one book ("Straf") was translated into English ("A Good Hiding"). His books contain many puns and twists.

=== Koning Wikkepokluk de merkwaardige zoekt een rijk ===
This book, published in 1974, took a long time to write. It describes the adventures of King Wikkepokluk the odd, who is looking ("zoekt") for his kingdom ("rijk"). It feels a bit like a fairy tale (it even opens with "Once upon a time"). The book is supposedly influenced by Finnegans Wake and Ubu Roi and was awarded with the Gouden Penseel for the beautiful ink drawings that Wim added to the story.

=== Het vlot ===
The title translates to "The Raft". The book, published in 1989, describes the town of Vlissingen after the bombings of World War II. The main character is a little boy, who is trying to escape, and decides to build a raft, to be able to travel like Huckleberry Finn. The book was awarded the highest prize for Dutch children books, the Gouden Griffel.

=== Zwart als inkt ===
This book was published in 1998 and its title translates to "Black as ink". The subtitle ("is het verhaal van Sneeuwwitje en de zeven dwergen") means "is the story of Snow white and the seven dwarves". At the surface this book is indeed the well known fairy tale, but it is more tragic, cruel, touching and funny than the original. Like other books of Wim Hofman ("Klein Duimpje", "Straf"/"A Good Hiding") it shows the powerless position of children in the world. "Zwart als inkt" also received the Gouden Griffel in 1998.
