= Lemniscaat =

Dutch publishing house

- Founded: 1963
- Founder: Jean Louis and Marijke Boele van Hensbroek
- Country of origin: Netherlands
- Headquarters location: Rotterdam

Lemniscaat or Lemniscaat Publishers is a Dutch independent publishing house based in Rotterdam, Netherlands. The company publishes both children's literature and non-fiction books for adults. The company is named after the lemniscate symbol.

== History ==
Lemniscaat was founded in 1963 by Jean Louis and Marijke Boele van Hensbroek. The company is currently run by their son Jean Christophe Boele van Hensbroek.

Many Dutch children's authors have had their work published by Lemniscaat, including Jan Terlouw, Thea Beckman, Ingrid Schubert, Julia Donaldson, Dieter Schubert, Lieneke Dijkzeul and Anke Kranendonk. The company has also worked with many illustrators, including Linde Faas, Jan Jutte, Marieke ten Berge, Marijke ten Cate Alice Hoogstad, Charlotte Dematons and Marije Tolman. Relatively new authors are Hans Sibbel, Pieter Koolwijk, Robin Raven, Reinier Sonneveld, Tjibbe Veldkamp and Annejan Mieras.

In 2007, the company started to republish Paul Biegel's work but with new illustrations that the company paid for. As a result, Lemniscaat had to pay a lower amount of royalties to Leonie Biegel, Biegel's daughter. In 2012, Lemniscaat filed a preliminary injunction against Biegel's daughter who intended to move her father's work to another publishing house.
