= Van Gorp =

Van Gorp is a surname. Notable people with the name include:

- Corrie van Gorp (1942 – 2020) was a Dutch actress and singer
- Elke Van Gorp (born 1995), Belgian football midfielder
- Menno van Gorp (born 1989), Dutch breakdancer
- Michele Van Gorp (born 1977), former professional basketball player

== See also ==
- Gorp
- Van Goor
- Van Gurp
