= Holland (publisher) =

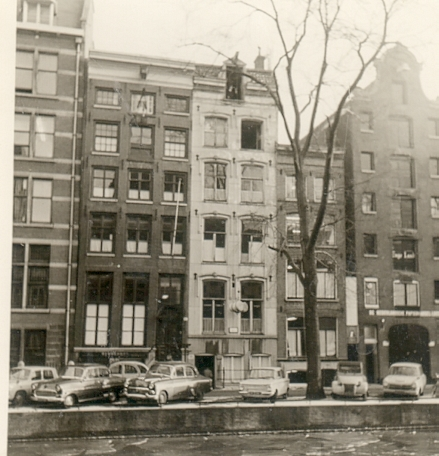
Warehouse and office of Holland on the canal Herengracht 149 in Amsterdam, March 1964. Nr. 149 is the "light" building, some roles of carton are pulled up.

Holland (publisher) (Uitgeverij Holland) is an independent Dutch publishing house of books for children and books for adults, founded in 1921 by Jan Bernhard van Ulzen in Amsterdam.

== From 1921 until 1951 ==
After having worked a few years as a sales representative for several publishing houses Jan Berhard van Ulzen established his own publishing business at his home address. The first publications were financed by his wife who had been a successful fashion cutter in Paris. After a few years the business could be located on the canal Herengracht in Amsterdam. In these years Holland specialized in social, Christian publications by original Dutch writers. A few translations were published, for instants (1937) Søren Kierkegaard, (1951) Pär Lagerkvist, and (1940) Denis de Rougemont. Next to books Holland also published a Christian literary magazine called Opwaartsche Wegen, which was published for 17 years. Poetry was published since 1950 in a series called De Windroos

== From 1951 until 1981 ==
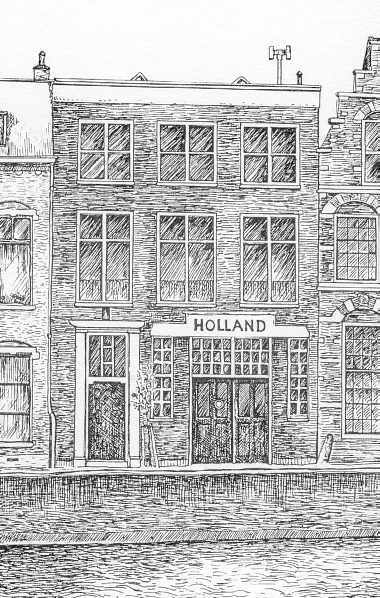
Warehouse and office of Holland on the river Spaarne in Haarlem

In 1951 Jan Bernhard van Ulzen was assisted by his son Rolf van Ulzen, who succeeded in the late sixties of the previous century. As Rolf van Ulzen had started to participate in large international co-productions for encyclopaedia's and fairy tales, the location for office and warehouse in Amsterdam was no longer suitable. The lofts on the Herengracht were not strong enough to bear the weight of heavy books. The building in Haarlem was more suitable with storage possibilities on the ground floor.

In 1955 (Bonte Boekjes series) he started with children's book. For these scripts he asked poets as he thought the imagination for poetry must be the same as for children's books. Important writers of these days were Hans Andreus, Paul Biegel, Mies Bouhuys, Mieke van Hooft and Harriet Laurey.

== From 1981 until today ==
In 1981 Rolf van Ulzen was assisted by his son Ruurt van Ulzen, who succeeded in 1987. The children's books were expanded by new Dutch authors, such as:

- Thea Dubelaar
- Wilma Geldof,
- Thijs Goverde,
- Leny van Grootel,
- Henk Hardeman,
- Gonneke Huizing,
- Henk van Kerkwijk,
- Peter Smit

== Translated children's book writers ==
From several foreign children's book writers translations were made, such as:

=== From English ===
- Joan Aiken
- Malcolm Bosse
- Susan Cooper
- Gary Crew
- Scott O'Dell
- Paula Fox
- Frances Mary Hendry
- Mollie Hunter
- Gene Kemp
- Sue Mayfield
- Mary Norton (author)
- Katherine Paterson
- Arthur Ransome
- Elizabeth George Speare
- Catherine Storr
- Mildred D. Taylor
- Sean Taylor (author)

=== From German ===
- Karl Bruckner
- Willi Färhrmann
- Ursula Fuchs
- Susanne Fulcher
- Tilde Michiels
- Gudrun Mebs
- Marietta Moskin
- Tillman Röhrig
- Angela Sommer-Bodenburg
- Ingrid Uebe

=== Others ===
- Maurice Druon
- Maria Grippe
- Torill Hauger
- Marita Lindquist

Classics like Greek- and Roman Myths by Gustav Schwab, Tales of Shakespeare by Charles Lamb and Mary Lamb and small biographies of famous philosophers by Paul Strathern were published in Dutch translation.

== Sources ==
- Official website
- Dutch Publishers Association
- Dutch Wikipedia
- Independent Dutch Publishers
- Interview in Boekenwereld by Prof. Dr. Lisa Kuitert with Ruurt van Ulzen, Jaargang 19, nummer 1, oktober 2002
