= GARP =

GARP may refer to:

== Arts and entertainment ==
- Monkey D. Garp, a character in the Japanese anime One Piece
- The World According to Garp, a 1978 novel by John Irving
  - The World According to Garp (film), a 1982 film based on Irving's novel

== Economics ==
- Generalized Axiom of Revealed Preference, in economics
- Global Association of Risk Professionals, a financial membership association
- Growth at a reasonable price, in investment management

== Science and technology ==
- Generic Attribute Registration Protocol, a communications protocol
- Genetic Algorithm for Rule Set Production, to determine ecological niches
- Global Atmospheric Research Program, 1967-1982
- Gratuitous Address Resolution Protocol, in computer networking

== Other uses ==
- Torkild Garp (1883–1976), Danish gymnast
