= Paul Biegel =

Dutch writer (1925–2006)

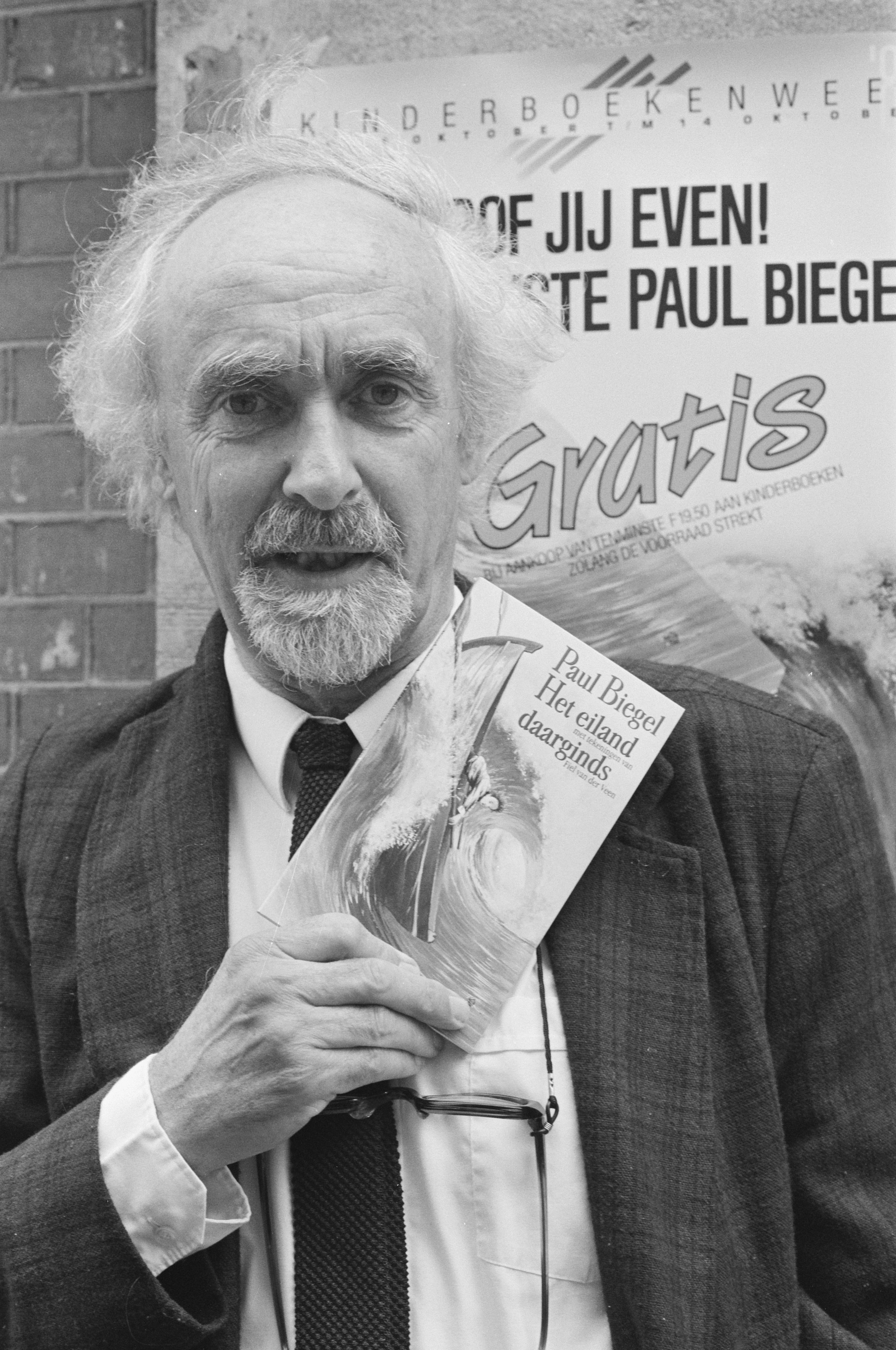
- Paul Biegel (1989)
- Born: Paulus Johannes Biegel; 25 March 1925; Bussum, Netherlands
- Died: 21 October 2006 (aged 81); Laren, Netherlands
- Occupations: Journalist, comics writer, novelist
- Children: 2
- Writing career
- Period: 1965–2005
- Genre: Children's literature
- Notable work: The King of the Copper Mountains
- Notable awards: Gouden Griffel (1965, 1972, and 1993), Woutertje Pieterse Prijs (1991 and 2000)
- Website: www.paulbiegel.com

Signature
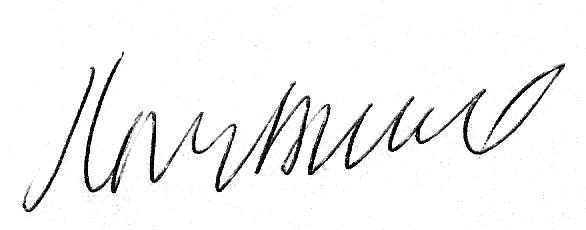

Paulus Johannes "Paul" Biegel (Note: The phrase Paulus Johannes "Paul" Biegel is pronounced [ˈpʌulʏ ɕoːˈɦɑnəs pʌul ˈbiɣəl]. The words in isolation are pronounced [ˈpʌulʏs], [joːˈɦɑnəs], [ˈpʌul] and [ˈbiɣəl].) (25 March 1925 – 21 October 2006) was a Dutch writer of children's literature.

== Biography ==
Paul Biegel was born in Bussum in 1925. His father, Hermann Biegel, was of German descent, and owned a building materials shop. With his wife Madeleine Povel-Guillot he had nine children, six girls and three boys, of whom Paul was the youngest. He was not a prolific reader as a child, preferring to play outside. His favourite books were the fairy tales of the brothers Grimm and the works of Jules Verne. He studied in Bussum (primary school) and Amsterdam, graduating in 1945.

His first story, De ontevreden kabouter ("The unhappy gnome"), written when he was 14 years old, was printed in the newspaper De Tijd. He wanted to become a pianist, but decided that he didn't have enough talent. He went to the United States for a year after World War II, where he worked for The Knickerbocker Weekly. After his return, he worked as an editor for Dutch magazines like the Avrobode. He commenced Law Studies, but stopped these in 1953. He wrote several newspaper comics, the most important of which was Minter and Hinter, which appeared in Het Vrije Volk for ten stories and 579 episodes. In 1959, he started working in the comic studio of Marten Toonder as a comics writer for the Kappie series.

He only published his first book, De gouden gitaar, in 1962. He became one of the most important Dutch writers for children in 1965, when he received the Gouden Griffel for Het sleutelkruid. In 1973, he won the Staatsprijs voor kinder- en jeugdliteratuur literary award. He has written over 50 books, mostly published by Holland, and many of his books have been translated in English, French, German, Danish, Swedish, Welsh, South African, Japanese, Turkish, Greek, and Spanish. His own favourites were De tuinen van Dorr and De soldatenmaker. Other authors he appreciated included J. R. R. Tolkien, J. K. Rowling, and Hans Christian Andersen.

Paul Biegel lived in Amsterdam. He married Marijke Sträter in 1960, with whom he had a daughter, Leonie, in 1963, and in 1964 a son, Arthur, who committed suicide when he was 28. His marriage ultimately failed, and only at a later age did he publicly admit to being homosexual. He died in 2006 and was buried at Zorgvlied cemetery. In 2007, publishers Holland and Lemniscaat started reissuing twenty of his best works in the Biegelbibliotheek.

== Bibliography ==
- 1962: De gouden gitaar
- 1962: Het grote boek
- 1964: De kukelhaan
- 1964: Het sleutelkruid: translated as The King of the Copper Mountains (1967, J. M. Dent)
- 1964: Het lapjesbeest
- 1966: Kinderverhalen
- 1967: Ik wou dat ik anders was, translated as The Seven-times Search (1971, J. M. Dent)
- 1969: De Tuinen van Dorr, translated as The Gardens of Dorr (1975, J. M. Dent), illustrated by Tonke Dragt
- 1970: De zeven fabels uit Ubim
- 1971: Sebastiaan Slorp
- 1971: De twaalf rovers, translated as The Twelve Robbers (1974, J. M. Dent)
- 1971: De kleine kapitein, translated as The Little Captain (1971, J. M. Dent)
- 1973: Het olifantenfeest, translated as The Elephant Party (1977, Kestrell and Puffin Books)
- 1973: De kleine kapitein in het land van Waan en Wijs, translated as The Little Captain and the Seven Towers (1973, J. M. Dent)
- 1974: De vloek van Woestewolf, translated as The Curse of the Werewolf (1981, Blackie and Son Limited)
- 1974: Het stenen beeld, translated as Far Beyond and Back Again (1977, J. M. Dent)
- 1974: Twaalf sloeg de klok, translated as The Clock Struck Twelve (1979, Glover & Blair)
- 1975: De kleine kapitein en de schat van Schrik en Vreze, translated as The Little Captain and the Pirate Treasure (1980, J. M. Dent)
- 1975: De zeven veren van de papegaai
- 1976: Het spiegelkasteel, translated as The Looking-glass Castle (1979, Blackie and Son)
- 1976: De dwergjes van Tuil, translated as The Dwarfs of Nosegay (1978, Blackie and Son)
- 1977: De rover Hoepsika, translated as Robber Hopsika (1978, J. M. Dent)
- 1977: De brieven van de generaal, translated as Letters from the general (1979, J. M. Dent)
- 1977: Wie je droomt ben je zelf
- 1977: De wenende aap van Kleef
- 1978: Virgilius van Tuil, translated as The Fattest Dwarf of Nosegay (1980, Blackie and Son)
- 1979: Virgilius van Tuil op zoek naar een taart, translated as Virgil Nosegay and the Cake Hunt (1981, Blackie and Son)
- 1979: De toverhoed, translated as The Tin Can Beast and Other Stories (1980, Glover & Blair)
- 1980: Virgilius van Tuil en de rijke oom uit Zweden, translated as Virgil Nosegay and the Hupmobile (1983, Blackie and Son)
- 1981: Jiri, translated as Crocodile Man (1982, J. M. Dent)
- 1981: Haas, eerste boek: Voorjaar
- 1982: Haas, tweede boek: Zomer
- 1982: Haas, derde boek: Najaar
- 1982: Virgilius van Tuil overwintert bij de mensen, translated as Virgil Nosegay and the Wellington Boots (1984, Blackie and Son)
- 1984: Tante Mathilde en de sterren van de Grote Beer
- 1984: De zwarte weduwe
- 1984: Japie en de dingen
- 1984: Een tijdje later
- 1985: Japie en het grote geld
- 1985: Van de oude dame en de muis
- 1986: Japie rekent af
- 1986: Het wolkenschip
- 1987: De rode prinses (illustrated by Fiel van der Veen)
- 1989: Beer in het verkeer
- 1989: Het eiland daarginds
- 1990: Anderland, een Brandaan-mythe
- 1991: Juttertje Tim
- 1992: Nachtverhaal, translated as Night Story (illustrated by Lidia Postma)
- 1994: De soldatenmaker
- 1995: De karabijn
- 1996: Het ijzeren tapijt
- 1999: Laatste verhalen van de eeuw
- 2002: Een been stokkebeen
- 2003: Man en muis
- 2004: De roep van de kinkhoorn
- 2004: Swing!
- 2005: Wegloop
- 2007: De Lorrelee

=== Reworkings of classical books and stories ===
- 1966: Sprookjes van Grimm
- 1967: De rattevanger van Hameln
- 1969: Sprookjesmolen
- 1970: Sagen van Grimm
- 1971: Een toren naar de maan
- 1972: Reinaart de Vos
- 1975: De fabels van Aesopus
- 1995: Het beleg van Troje
- 1997: De zwerftochten van Aeneas

=== Translations ===
Among the 35 books Paul Biegel translated into Dutch are The Borrowers series by Mary Norton, three books by Michael Foreman, two by John Burningham, three by Tony Ross, and four by Kaye Umansky.

== Awards ==
- Dutch State Award for Children's Literature (1973)
- Woutertje Pieterse Prijs (1991: Anderland and 2000: Laatste verhalen van de eeuw)
- Nienke van Hichtum-prijs (1973: De twaalf rovers)
- Gouden Griffel (1965: Het sleutelkruid; 1972: De kleine kapitein and 1993: Nachtverhaal)
- Zilveren Griffel (1972: De twaalf rovers; 1974: Het olifantenfeest; 1982: Haas; 1988: De rode prinses)
- In 1996, Paul Biegel was nominated for the Hans Christian Andersen Award.
- In 1999, he was made a Knight in the Order of the Netherlands Lion.
