= Zwijsen =

Zwijsen is a Dutch surname. Notable people with the surname include:

- Johannes Zwijsen (1794–1877), Dutch Catholic prelate
- Thomas Zwijsen (born 1988), Dutch-Belgian guitarist
