= Van Goor =

Van Goor or Van de Goor is a Dutch-language surname. Notable people with the name include:

- Bas van de Goor (born 1971), Dutch football player
- Johan Wijnand van Goor (c. 1650 –1704), Dutch general in the Nine Years' War and the War of Spanish Succession
- Hans van Goor (born 1970), retired Dutch long distance swimmer
- Mike van de Goor (born 1973), retired volleyball player from the Netherlands

== See also ==
- Goor
- Van Gorp
