= Rebekka Aleida Biegel =

Dutch psychologist (1886–1943)

- Rebekka Biegel in 1911 (in the middle)
- Born: 27 July 1886; Groningen
- Died: 1 June 1943 (aged 56); Westerbork transit camp
- Education: University of Zurich; Utrecht University
- Occupations: Psychologist, psychotechnics

Rebekka Aleida (Betty) Biegel (27 July 1886 – 1 June 1943) was a Dutch psychologist, specializing in psychotechnics. She founded a psychotechnical laboratory and is therefore regarded as a female pioneer in applied psychology. Due to her Jewish heritage, she faced persecution and imprisonment during the Nazi occupation of the Netherlands during World War II. When she learned that she and her sister were about to be deported to the Auschwitz concentration camp, the two women committed suicide together.

== Biography ==
Biegel was born in Groningen, the second of four children from the marriage of Joseph Biegel and Henderina Jacoba Schaap. She grew up in a liberal and well-to-do family, which allowed her to continue her education and subsequently enter the workforce. After passing her exams at the Groningen Gymnasium in 1904, she went on to study astronomy in Leiden. During her studies, she struggled with poor health, forcing several interruptions. She became a member of the Association of Female Students in Leiden, becoming very active in the group and holding several positions.

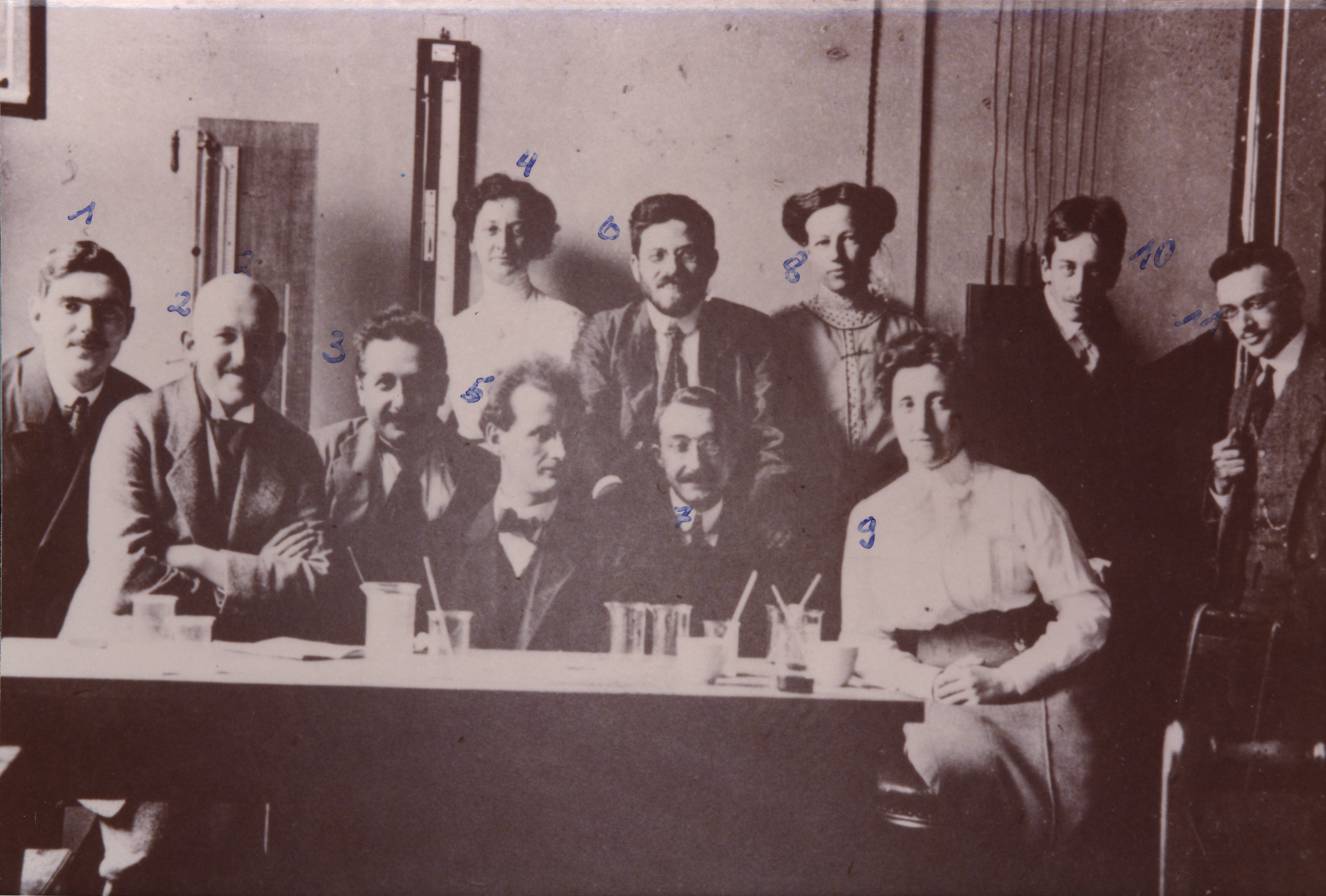
Albert Einstein and colleagues in the physics laboratory at ETH Zurich in 1913. Although the woman sitting on the right is often identified as Miss Girgorjeff, it is likely Betty Biegel.

She went to Zurich, Switzerland, to assist Albert Einstein with calculations for his theory of relativity. One meeting took place on 30 June 1913, which was confirmed in 2024 with an analysis of a group photograph that includes Einstein. The analysis concluded for the first time that one of the unidentified women in the photograph was Biegel.

From 1914 to 1923, Biegel earned her doctorate in astronomy at the University of Zurich (1921) on the star positions in Egyptian art with her dissertation Zür Astrognosie der alten Ägypter. After returning to the Netherlands, she moved in with her younger sister Annie in Amsterdam. They spent a lot of time together and shared the same friends; for this reason, they were sometimes referred to as the Biegel sisters. She has been described thusly: "Betty is a tall woman with dark hair, dark eyes, and is always dressed in equally dark, long dresses. To those closest to her, she is Betty, but she insists on being called Doctor Betty by everyone else."

At age 41, Biegel began studying psychology at Utrecht University. She chose this topic because, as a woman, she could not get permanent work as an astronomer and she saw more opportunities in psychotechnics. Psychotechnics is part of applied psychology and has been used as a term for conducting psychological tests, and Biegel "developed and shaped psychotechnics in the Netherlands in the 1930s." Psychotechnics primarily uses measuring equipment and places great value on objective results. After completing her studies in 1929, she was appointed as a psychotechnician at the PTT (State Postal, Telegraph and Telephone Company now KPN). As a psychotechnical advisor, she had the freedom to set up the laboratory herself and have measuring equipment made. Her work consisted of examining and selecting employees, particularly the company's drivers. She wanted to develop tests that were as complex as possible so that employee performance could be tested as broadly and realistically as possible. She felt that this offered more insight into employee performance than testing psychological functions, such as reaction time, separately.

Her laboratory, which opened in 1933, attracted a great deal of attention from home and abroad. In addition to her work at the PTT, she wrote extensively about mandatory medical examinations for drivers, and she taught psychotechnics at the Technical University in Delft after she raised the issue with the minister herself. She also participated in many conferences and visited foreign laboratories. She was one of the first board members of the Dutch Institute of Practicing Psychologists (NIPP, now the Dutch Institute of Psychologists).

== Persecution during the Second World War ==
Biegel's parents were Jewish and at some point they renounced their Jewish heritage, but this did not help Biegel against increasing oppression from German occupation forces who still considered her Jewish. In 1941, when many Jewish professionals were fired from their jobs, Biegel was dismissed from the PTT. That same year, the Jewish population was also forbidden to be members of associations, which forced Biegel to resign from her board position at the NIPP. She continued to lead the psychotechnical laboratory of the Jewish Central for Vocational Training for some time, which was involved in testing Jewish boys for employability.

In 1943, Rebekka and her sister Annie were arrested and on 26 May, they were taken to the Westerbork transit camp in the Netherlands. When they learned that they would be deported to the Auschwitz concentration camp, both sisters committed suicide by poison (potassium cyanide) on 1 June. Rebekka's body was cremated on 7 June 1943 and her ashes were interred in the Jewish cemetery in Diemen.

Even after her death, Biegel's influence remained. For example, her test for dispersed attention by drivers was used 34,565 times until 1971, when it was finally replaced. Her Morse test, which was designed to identify talented radio operators, is "still used today by various armies worldwide" as of 2024.

== Distinctions ==
- A memorial plaque honoring Biegel hangs in the Aula building at the Technical University, Delft.
