= Guus Kuijer =

Dutch author (born 1942)

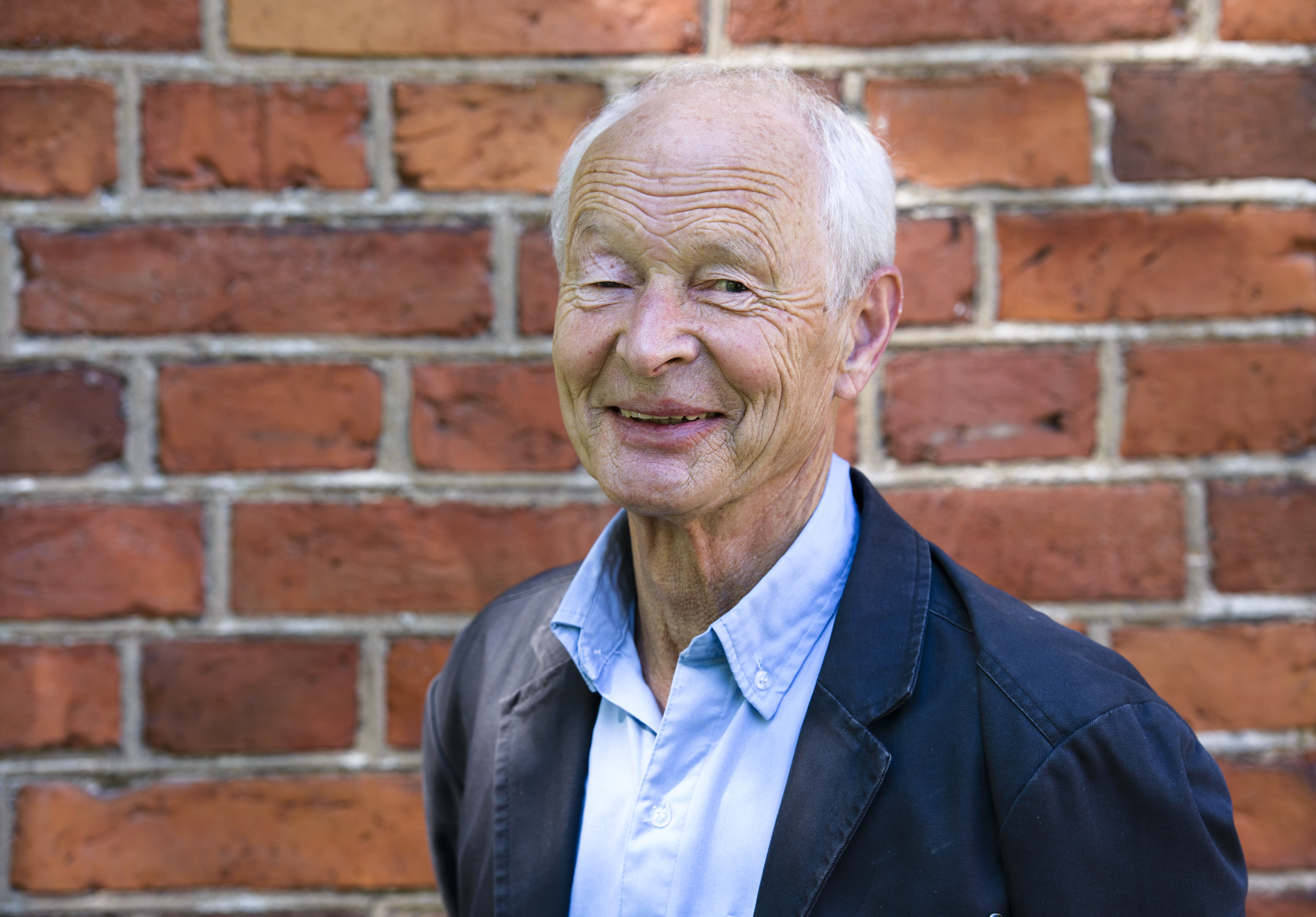
- Kuijer in 2012
- Born: 1 August 1942 (age 84); Amsterdam, Netherlands
- Education: Bachelor of Education
- Occupations: Teacher (1967–1973); Writer (1971 to date)
- Writing career
- Language: Dutch
- Genre: Children's literature
- Notable awards: Gouden Griffel; 1976, 1979, 2000, 2005; Golden Owl; 2005; Astrid Lindgren Award; 2012

Guus Kuijer (Dutch pronunciation: [ɣys ˈkœyər]; born 1 August 1942) is a Dutch author. He wrote books for children and adults, and is best known for the Madelief series of children's books. For his career contribution to "children's and young adult literature in the broadest sense" he won the Astrid Lindgren Memorial Award from the Swedish Arts Council in 2012, the biggest prize in children's literature. As a children's writer he was one of five finalists for the biennial, international Hans Christian Andersen Award in 2008.

== Early life ==
Guus Kuijer is born on 1 August 1942 in Amsterdam, Netherlands. His parents were members of the Catholic Apostolic Church, but in 2006 Kuijer explained that he doesn't remember ever believing in God.

He studied at the kweekschool in Doetinchem to become a teacher. From 1967 to 1973 he was a primary school teacher.

== Writing career ==
In 1968 he started writing short stories for the magazine Hollands Maandblad and in 1971 he published a collection of his short stories. In 1973 he stopped teaching in order to become a full-time writer and this year he published his first novel Het dochtertje van de wasvrouw.

In 1975 he published his first children's book Met de poppen gooien, for which he received a Gouden Griffel in 1976. This book was the first of five books about a girl named Madelief (lit. Daisy).

== Stage & screen adaptations ==
Years later, a television series Madelief (1994) and movie Scratches in the Table (1998) were made of his book series about Madelief (1975–1979). Of his book series Polleke (1999–2001) a movie Polleke (2003) and a television series Polleke (2005) were made.

In 2011 Australian Richard Tulloch translated The Book of Everything into English and adapted it into a very successful play produced in 2013 by the Melbourne Theatre Company.

== Works ==
- 1971 – Rose, met vrome wimpers
- 1973 – Het dochtertje van de wasvrouw
- 1975 – De man met de hamer
- 1975 – Een gat in de grens
- 1975 – Met de poppen gooien
- 1976 – Drie verschrikkelijke dagen
- 1976 – Grote mensen, daar kan je beter soep van koken
- 1977 – Pappa is een hond
- 1977 – Op je kop in de prullenbak
- 1978 – Krassen in het tafelblad
- 1978 – Hoe Mieke Mom haar maffe moeder vindt
- 1979 – Ik woonde in een leunstoel
- 1979 – Een hoofd vol macaroni
- 1980 – Wimpers, herziene druk van Rose, met vrome wimpers
- 1980 – Het geminachte kind
- 1980 – De tranen knallen uit mijn kop
- 1983 – Crisis en kaalhoofdigheid
- 1983 – Het grote boek van Madelief
- 1983 – Eend voor eend
- 1984 – De zwarte stenen
- 1985 – Het land van de neushoornvogel
- 1986 – De jonge prinsen
- 1987 – Tin Toeval en de kunst van het verdwalen
- 1987 – Tin Toeval en het geheim van Tweebeens-eiland
- 1988 – Izebel van Tyrus
- 1989 – Tin Toeval en de kunst van Madelief
- 1989 – De redder van Afrika —about Jacobus Capitein
- 1990 – Olle
- 1992 – Het vogeltje van Amsterdam
- 1993 – Tin Toeval in de onderwereld
- 1996 – De grote Tin Toeval
- 1996 – De verhalen van Jonathan
- 1999 – Voor altijd samen, amen
- 2000 – Het is fijn om er te zijn
- 2000 – Het geluk komt als de donder
- 2000 – Reukorgel
- 2001 – Met de wind mee naar zee
- 2001 – Ik ben Polleke hoor! (Kinderboekenweekgeschenk 2001)
- 2003 – Polleke
- 2004 – Het boek van alle dingen
- 2006 – Hoe een klein rotgodje God vermoordde
- 2007 – Het doden van een mens
- 2009 – Hoe word ik gelukkig?
- 2011 – Draaikonten en haatblaffers —about Benito Arias Montano and the origin of a tolerant society
- 2012 – De Bijbel voor ongelovigen. Het Begin - Genesis
- 2013 – De Bijbel voor ongelovigen / 2. De Uittocht en de Intocht - Exodus, Jozua, Rechters
- 2014 – De Bijbel voor ongelovigen / 3. Saul, David, Samuel en Ruth
- 2015 – De Bijbel voor ongelovigen / 4. Koning David en de splitsing van het rijk
- 2016 – De Bijbel voor ongelovigen / 5. De twee koninkrijken, Job en de profeten
- 2016 – The Bible for Unbelievers, translated by Laura Watkinson

== Awards ==
- 1976 – Gouden Griffel for Met de poppen gooien
- 1977 – Zilveren Griffel for Grote mensen, daar kun je beter soep van koken
- 1979 – Staatsprijs voor kinder- en jeugdliteratuur
- 1979 – Gouden Griffel for Krassen in het tafelblad
- 1984 – Zilveren Griffel for Eend voor eend
- 1988 – Zilveren Griffel for Tin Toeval en de kunst van het verdwalen / Tin Toeval en het geheim van tweebeenseiland
- 2000 – Gouden Griffel for Voor altijd samen, amen
- 2002 – Zilveren Griffel for Met de wind mee naar de zee
- 2003 – Woutertje Pieterse Prijs for Ik ben Polleke hoor!
- 2005 – Gouden Griffel for Het boek van alle dingen
- 2005 – Gouden Uil jeugdliteratuurprijs for Het boek van alle dingen
- 2007 – E. du Perronprijs for Hoe een klein rotgodje god vermoordde (2006) and Het doden van een mens (2007)
- 2012 – Astrid Lindgren Memorial Award
