= Clavis (publisher) =

Flemish publishing house

- Status: Active
- Founded: 1981
- Founder: Philippe Werck
- Country of origin: Belgium
- Headquarters location: Hasselt, Belgium
- Distribution: Simon & Schuster (USA)
- Official website: www.clavisbooks.com

Clavis, Clavis Publishing or Clavis Media is a Flemish publishing house of children's books based in Hasselt, Belgium with additional offices in Amsterdam and New York City. The company is the largest publisher of Dutch-language children's literature.

== History ==
The company was founded in 1981 by the family Werck and the company published its first children's book in 1984.

The company has published many books by Dutch and Flemish authors and illustrators, including Guido Van Genechten, Iny Driessen, Bart Demyttenaere, Ed Franck, Liesbet Slegers, Kolet Janssen, Anneriek van Heugten, Stefaan Van Laere, Gerard van Gemert, Patrick Lagrou, Sanne te Loo, Betty Mellaerts, Maria Heylen, Johan Vandevelde, Marleen Mutsaers, Patrick Bernauw and Marc de Bel.

In February 2011, director Philippe Werck was replaced by Willy Vanden Poel after years of complaints by authors and illustrators regarding late payments. In July 2011, the Werck family bought back their ownership stake in Clavis from the investment firm LRM (minority shareholder in the company) and Philippe Werck became CEO again. In 2018 Philippe transferred his stake to his daughters Kristien and Sigrid.
