= J. J. de Bom, voorheen de Kindervriend =

J. J. de Bom, voorheen de Kindervriend is a Dutch television show that ran for three seasons, from 1979 to 1981. It was aired by Omroepvereniging VARA. The show was the creation of Aart Staartjes, Wieteke van Dort, and Joost Prinsen, with songs and poetry written by the writers' collective of Willem Wilmink, Karel Eykman, and Hans Dorrestijn. The show, which continued an earlier show by the same actors and writers (De Stratemakeropzeeshow), was one of the groundbreaking programs on Dutch television in choosing the perspective of children and paying attention to real-life problems faced by young people.
