= Bram van Erkel =

Dutch television director and presenter (1932–2026)

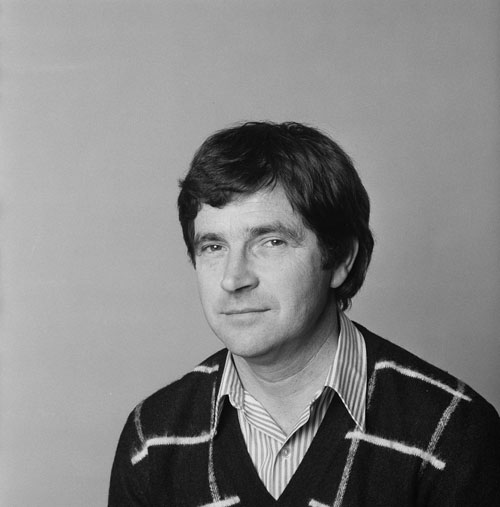
- Bram van Erkel in 1980
- Born: 24 July 1932; Rotterdam, South Holland, Netherlands
- Died: 20 October 2026 (aged 94); Laren, North Holland, Netherlands
- Years active: 1960–2003
- Presenting career
- Show: Oebele; Q & Q; Het wassende water; De zomer van '45; In naam der koningin
- Country: Netherlands

Bram van Erkel (24 July 1932 – 20 October 2026) was a Dutch television director, programme-maker and television presenter. He worked on children's programmes, comedies, and drama series for broadcasters including AVRO, KRO, NCRV, and VARA. His body of work includes Oebele, Q & Q, Het wassende water, and De zomer van '45. Furthermore, he hosted the game show Klassewerk.

== Career ==
=== Early years ===
Van Erkel attended the teacher training college, where he was Koos Postema's classmate. He began his career as a teacher. From 1960, he worked as a director and producer for television, creating both drama series and standalone drama productions.

Between 1964 and 1966, he directed the children's series Vrouwtje Bezemsteel for the AVRO. In the series, a witch told stories to her servant, Sam Pardoes. The directing duties were subsequently taken over by Anneke Hoog Antink.

=== Children's programmes and presenting ===
From 1968 to 1971, Van Erkel directed Oebele for the KRO, a musical children's programme set in a fictional county. He also contributed to the scripts, alongside writers such as Harrie Geelen and Imme Dros. The music was composed by Joop Stokkermans. Wieteke van Dort and Willem Nijholt played the lead roles of Aagje Ritsema and Koen de Graaf. In all, 31 episodes were produced.

Between 1970 and 1978, he hosted Klassewerk. In this KRO programme, primary school pupils competed against each other in challenges involving knowledge, music, drama, and skill. At first, he co-hosted the show with Eveline van Velsen-Branbergen, and later with Antoinette van Brink. The programme was discontinued in 1974 but returned in 1976. In 1978, Van Erkel was succeeded by Hans van Willigenburg.

Van Erkel collaborated once again with Harrie Geelen on the children's series Q & Q. The first season was broadcast in 1974, followed by a second in 1976. The series revolves around two boys who investigate potential crimes. According to the Netherlands Institute for Sound and Vision, the first season drew roughly four million viewers per episode. The music was once again composed by Joop Stokkermans.

In 1979, he directed Duel in de diepte, based on a screenplay by Anton Quintana. The series featured, among others, Rutger Hauer, Lex Schoorel, Peter Faber, and Lidy Sluyter.

=== Film and television drama ===
Van Erkel directed Mevrouw Katrien (1982), a short film based on a story by R.J. Peskens, starring Jan Decleir and Chris Lomme. The film was part of the triptych Het verleden ("The Past"), which also featured contributions from directors Bas van der Lecq and Roy Logger.

For the NCRV, he directed Het wassende water ("The Rising Water"; 1986), based on the novel of the same name by Herman de Man. Peter van Gestel wrote the screenplay. The series follows Gieljan Beijen – played by Thom Hoffman – as he rises from a farmer's son to become an acting dijkgraaf (dike reeve). According to the Netherlands Institute for Sound and Vision, the series reached nearly seven million viewers at its peak.

This was followed by Het Twentsche paradijs (1988), a social drama about the decline of the textile industry in the Twente region, featuring actors such as Huub Stapel, Bernhard Droog, and Marlies van Alcmaer. In 1989, Van Erkel directed Rust roest for the NCRV, a comedy series based on a screenplay by Jelte Rep, about residents of a nursing home who become involved in a plan to rob a bank.

De zomer van '45 (1991) focused on the lives of two Dutchwomen who, after the country's liberation from Nazi German occupation, entered into relationships with Canadian soldiers. The series was based on the books "We Became Canadians" and "Children of the Liberation" by Olga Rains. The screenplay was written by Willem Capteyn, Carel Donck, and Hugo Heinen.

He also directed work for Coverstory, a drama series about the editorial staff of a weekly magazine. The 1993 episode De valse Lady was screened at the 1994 Netherlands Film Festival.

In 1996, he directed the historical drama series In naam der koningin ("In the Name of the Queen"), based on a screenplay by Geert van Doormaal. The series is set during the Dutch colonial warfare in Aceh. Its cast included, among others, Thom Hoffman and Rik Launspach.

=== Later work ===
For the broadcaster VARA, Van Erkel directed Ben zo terug ("I'll be right back"; 1999–2000), a comedy series set in a hairdresser's shop in a Rotterdam working-class neighbourhood. The screenplay was written by, among others, Chiem van Houweninge, Marina de Vos, and Joris Lutz.

In 2003, he was one of the directors of Bergen Binnen, a series about elderly artists and actors living together in a villa. The series was intended as a follow-up to Oppassen!!! ("Look Out!!!") and ran until 2004. The Netherlands Institute for Sound and Vision credits Van Erkel as a director for the year 2003.

With Schudden tot het sneeuwt ("Shake Until It Snows"), he returned to the musical children's programme genre. The series, based on a script by Jurrian van Dongen, was set inside a snow globe. Its sixteen episodes were broadcast by Fox Kids in 2003, and subsequently by the AVRO between late 2003 and 2005.

== Death ==
Van Erkel died at the Rosa Spier Huis in Laren, on 20 October 2026, at the age of 94.

== Work ==
The table below contains a selection of his work, arranged from oldest to newest. The years refer to the original broadcasts or the year of release, unless a specific period for his contribution is indicated.

| Year | Title | Genre | Contribution | Notes | Source |
|---|---|---|---|---|---|
| 1964–1966 | Vrouwtje Bezemsteel | Children's series | Direction | His period as director; the series continued thereafter. | |
| 1968–1971 | Oebele | Musical children's programme | Direction and text contributions | KRO program with, among others, Wieteke van Dort and Willem Nijholt. | |
| 1970–1978 | Klassewerk | Game show for school students | Presentation | His period as presenter, with an interruption in the programme between 1974 and 1976. | |
| 1974 & 1976 | Q & Q | Youth series | Direction | Two series based on scripts by Harrie Geelen. | |
| 1978 | De Kris Pusaka | Youth series | Direction | Written by Anton Quintana. | |
| 1979 | Duel in de diepte | Youth series | Direction | Screenplay by Anton Quintana. | |
| 1982 | Mevrouw Katrien | Short film | Direction | Part of the triptych Het verleden, based on stories by R.J. Peskens. | |
| 1986 | Het wassende water | Drama series | Direction | Based on the novel by Herman de Man; screenplay by Peter van Gestel. | |
| 1988 | Het Twentsche paradijs | Drama | Direction | About the decline of the textile industry in Twente. | |
| 1989 | Rust roest | Comedy series | Direction | NCRV series based on a screenplay by Jelte Rep. | |
| 1991 | De zomer van '45 | Drama series | Direction | Based on books by Olga Rains. | |
| 1993 | Coverstory – De valse Lady | Drama series episode | Direction | Episode screened at the 1994 Netherlands Film Festival. | |
| 1996 | In naam der koningin | Historical drama series | Direction | Screenplay by Geert van Doormaal. | |
| 1999–2000 | Ben zo terug | Comedy series | Direction | VARA series set in a Rotterdam hairdresser's. | |
| 2003 | Bergen Binnen | Comedy series | Direction, alongside others | His contribution dates from 2003; the series ran until 2004. | |
| 2003 | Schudden tot het sneeuwt | Musical children's programme | Direction | First broadcast in 2003; subsequently also broadcast by the AVRO. | |
