= Pinkeltje (film) =

1978 film

- Directed by: Harrie Geelen
- Starring: Aart Staartjes; Wieteke van Dort; Lex Goudsmit; Emmy Lopes Dias
- Music by: Joop Stokkermans
- Release date: 1978
- Country: Netherlands
- Language: Dutch

Pinkeltje is a 1978 Dutch film directed by Harrie Geelen. The movie is based on the books of Dutch writer Dick Laan about the fictional character Pinkeltje (Fingerling in English).

== Cast ==
- Aart Staartjes as Pinkeltje (Fingerling)
- Wieteke van Dort as Pinkelotje
- Lex Goudsmit as Pinkelbaron Krikhaer
- Emmy Lopes Dias as Pinkeldame Akeleitje
- Bob de Lange as Dick Laan
- Ab Hofstee as Ponkel Poortbewaarder
- Will van Selst as Prins Pinkelbert
