= Dick Laan =

Dutch writer and film pioneer

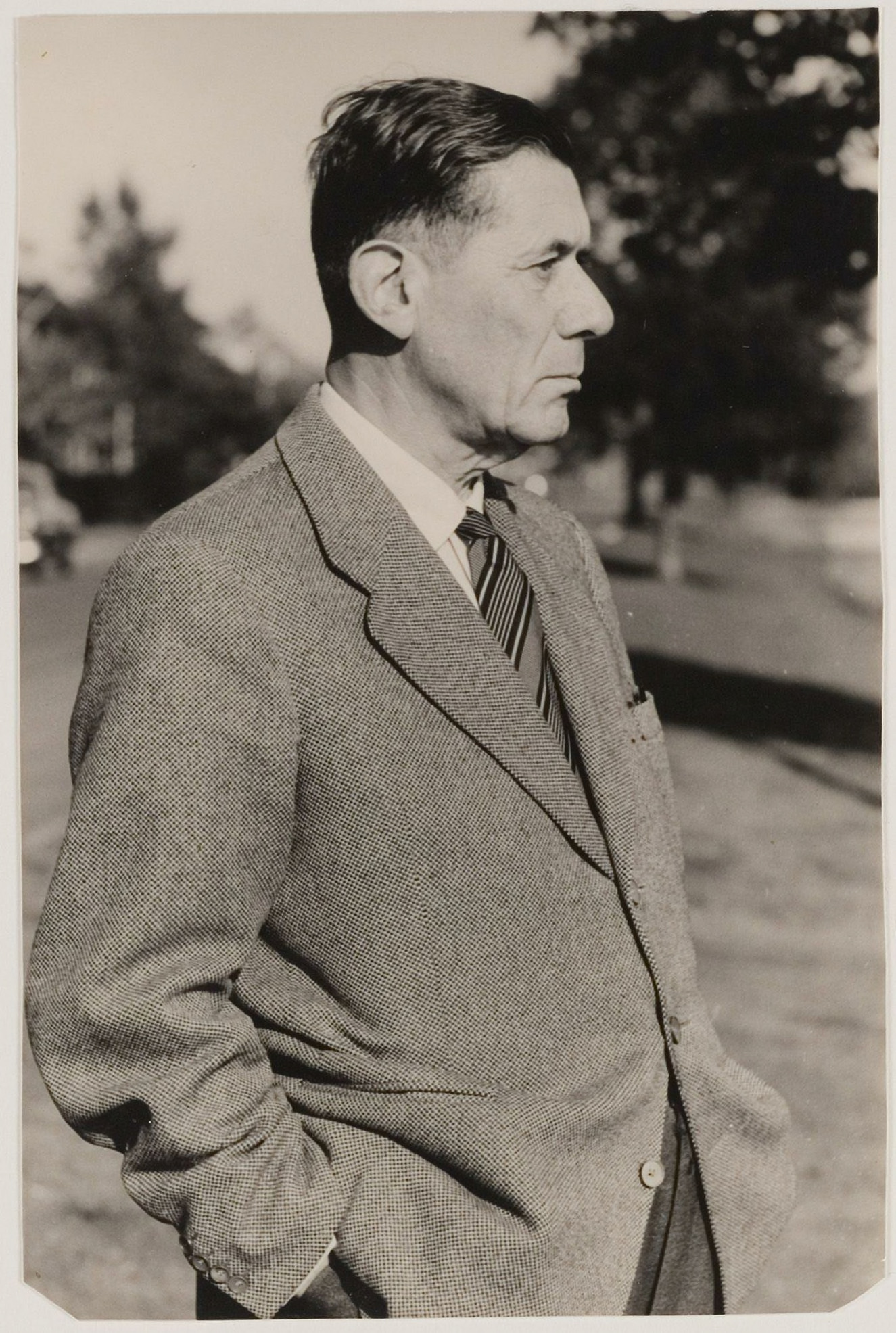
- Dick Laan (ca. 1940)
- Born: 18 December 1894 Wormerveer, North Holland, The Netherlands
- Died: 6 October 1973 (aged 78) Heemstede, North Holland, The Netherlands
- Notable works: Pinkeltje

Dick Laan (18 December 1894, Wormerveer – 6 October 1973, Heemstede) was a Dutch children's writer and film pioneer. He is best known for his Pinkeltje (published in English as Fingerling) series of children's books.

== Early career ==
Laan was the son of Jan Cornelis Laan and the grandson of Teunis Crok, the founders of the oil and fat processing company "Crok & Laan" (since 1971 part of Unilever). The Laan family moved in 1902 to Bloemendaal. Dick Laan started working in his father's factories in Wormerveer, and was included in the company's board of directors in 1916.

== Films ==
When production at this factory temporarily dwindled during the First World War, he started spending more time on his main hobby, filming. He made his first movie in 1917, and went on to make 50 more movies and documentaries. He was the first to make children's movies, filmed with children he knew from his football club, Koninklijke HFC, and the scouting club De Zwarte Pijl where he was a Scout Leader.

In 1927 he founded the Dutch Film Collective (De Nederlandsche Filmliga) with several other directors (see: De Nederlandsche Filmliga).

In 1929 he produced and directed the film Voetbal, the first artistic movie about the sport. The movie director Joris Ivens once stated that he had learned a lot from Dick Laan.

== Books ==
His writing of screenplays for movies led him to write children's books. His first published work consists of a number of boy's juvenile (adventure) books.

=== Pinkeltje ===
However, Laan is by far best known for his Pinkeltje series of children books, featuring a pinky-sized hero. The first book was published in 1939 and went on to sell 3 million copies in Dutch. He would write another 28 entries in the series, though the last four volumes were published only posthumously. Translations of Pinkeltje have been made in English, Chinese, Danish, Finnish, French, German, Norwegian, Portuguese, Swedish and Icelandic.

== In popular culture ==
=== Films ===
In 1978, 5 years after Dick Laan's death, Harrie Geelen directed and wrote the screenplay for a live-action Pinkeltje film, which was quite successful in the Netherlands and starred Aart Staartjes as Pinkeltje and Wieteke van Dort as his female companion Pinkelotje.

=== Legacy ===
Pinkeltje's popularity in the Netherlands is witnessed by the forty-plus nursery schools and kindergartens named after Pinkeltje, Pinkelotje or other characters from the books.

=== Tributes ===
In Heemstede, where Laan spent the last years of his life, a street was named the Dick Laanlaan ("laan" means lane) in his honor, which was later changed to the "Laan van Dick Laan". Almere has a Dick Laan street, and his birthplace, Wormerveer, has a square called the Dick Laan square.

== Bibliography ==
- Het Geheim van den Zwarten Monnik, 1930 ("The Secret of the Black Monk")
- De raad van zeven, 1930 ("The Council of Seven")
- Rudi's Spaansche avonturen, 1931 ("Rudy's Spanish Adventures")
- Circusjong, 1933 ("Circus Boy")
- De berg M, 1935 ("The Mountain M")
- Tarakanner tegen wil en dank, 1936 ("Unwillingly Shipmate of the Tarakan")
- Het goud van den Amerikaan, 1939 ("The Gold of the American")
- Pinkeltje-series, 1939–1977 (translated as "Fingerling")
- Dick Laan over Film. Herinneringen en belevenissen van een oud-filmer [1964] ("Memories of an old film maker")
