= Q & Q =

1974 Dutch Television Series

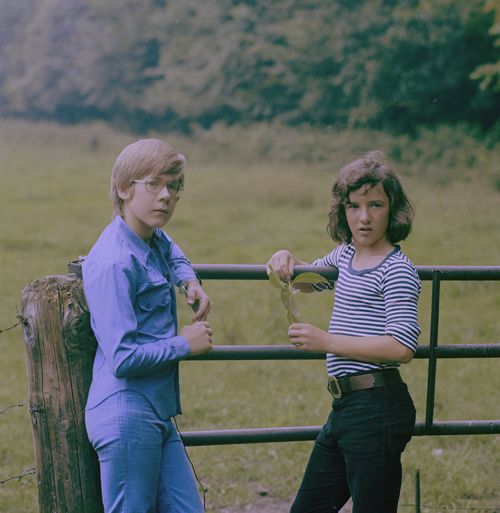
Q and Q: Aristides Quarles van Ispen (Erik van 't Wout, left) and Wilbur Quant (Martin Perels)

Q & Q is a Dutch television series, broadcast by the Katholieke Radio Omroep (KRO) in 1974. With an average audience of three million viewers, the show is one of the highest-viewed programs in the history of Dutch television.

The first series of thirteen episodes came to be called A failed photograph. A second series, Kunst- en vliegwerk, also thirteen episodes, was made for the 1976 season; that series was later shortened and released in theaters as a movie.

== Plot ==
In the first series, two teenage amateur photographers, Aristides Quarles van Ispen (Erik van 't Wout) and Wilbur Quant (Martin Perels), see the body of a man on some photographs they took while in the forest of the Gooi area. When they return to the forest, the body is gone and nobody believes them except for grandfather Van Ispen (Bob de Lange). With his help they investigate the case, which turns out to revolve around a smuggling ring.

== Cast ==
- Wilbur Quant – Martin Perels
- Aristides Quarles van Ispen – Erik van 't Wout
- Father Van Ispen – Frans Kokshoorn
- Grandfather Van Ispen – Bob de Lange
- Leonie Quarles van Ispen – Emmy Lopes Dias
- Adjudant Mudde – Sacco van der Made
- Axel Zaneck - Ferd Hugas

== Production and background ==
The series was directed by Bram van Erkel and starred Lex Goudsmit and others. Harrie Geelen wrote the screenplay. Music for the series was written by Joop Stokkermans.

According to the KRO, the series was intended as a "comical detective series for a youthful audience". On the other hand, screenwriter Geelen, who had been working since 1972 on the highly successful series Kunt u mij de weg naar Hamelen vertellen mijnheer?, was looking for a different kind of challenge and intended to write a more down-to-earth show with blood and horror effects, as opposed to the fairytale-like Hamelen. The show did cause some mild controversy: a scene in which the housekeeper of one of the boys breaks a glass bottle over the head of a criminal led many adults to complain to the KRO in a series of letters quickly responded to by many of the young viewers who supported the show. The show was hugely popular with an average audience of three million viewers, and the two lead actors, Martin Perels and Erik van 't Wout, were showered with attention from female fans who followed them in the streets, sang them the theme song, and wrote love letters with enclosed locks of hair.

== Legacy ==
The series continues to have its fans, groups of whom organize such things as tours of the locations where filming took place. The first series was rerun twice on Dutch television (in twelve rather than thirteen episodes), most recently in 1995, and released on DVD in 2004. The second series was never rerun, but appeared on DVD in 2005. Each of the series was published as a book as well.

Van 't Wout and Perels continue to be identified by their roles as Q and Q; both were followed around by fans whenever they appeared in public (fans typically hummed or sang the theme song at them) though Van 't Wout, whose character was a prototypical nerd, received a lot less mail than did Perels, whose character was a tough kid with a leather jacket. After the series were over, Perels refused all parts offered to him and made a career in real estate and financial management; he died in 2005 at age 44 of a brain tumor. Van 't Wout continued acting (including a part in De Kris Pusaka, another very popular Dutch television series, and one in A Bridge Too Far). At eighteen, he enrolled at the Netherlands Film and Television Academy, where his popularity as Q proved a hindrance more than a benefit. He later returned to television as assistant director and director.

The body in the photograph was played by Wim Hogenkamp, a well-known singer and actor, who was found murdered in his Amsterdam apartment, his body apparently lying in the same position as the body in Q & Q. Van 't Wout commented in 1994 (when he and Perels reunited after sixteen years) on this remarkable death when discussing how many of the actors associated with the series had by then died.
