= Staartjes =

Staartjes is a Dutch surname. Notable people with the surname include:

- Aart Staartjes (1938–2020), Dutch actor, director, television presenter and documentary maker
- Ben Staartjes (1928–2014), Dutch sailor
