= Aart Staartjes =

Dutch actor (1938–2020)

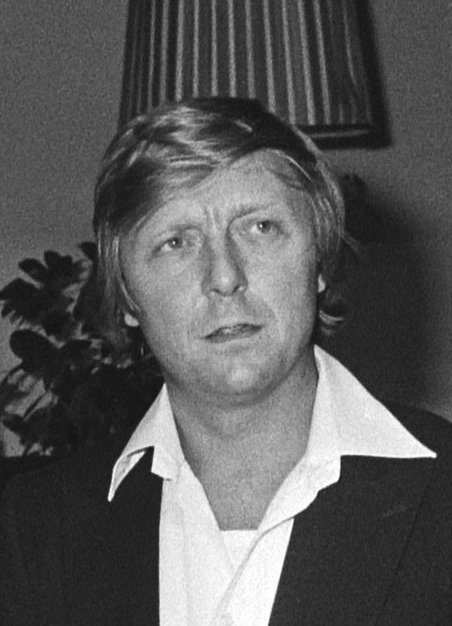
- Aart Staartjes (1979)
- Born: 1 March 1938; Amsterdam, Netherlands
- Died: 12 January 2020 (aged 81); Groningen, Netherlands
- Occupations: Actor, director, presenter, author
- Years active: 1957-2020
- Known for: Playing Meneer Aart in Sesamstraat

Aart Staartjes (1 March 1938 – 12 January 2020) was a Dutch actor, director, television presenter and documentary maker from Amsterdam. He portrayed Meneer Aart ("Mister Aart") on Sesamstraat, the Dutch co-production of Sesame Street. The character was used in the title of his 2002 biography Meneer Aart: Leven en werken van de man die geen kindervriend wil heten ("Mister Aart: Life and work of the man who does not want to be named a friend to children").

Staartjes presented the annual arrival of Sinterklaas in the Netherlands.

== Early life ==
Staartjes was born in Nieuwendam, a neighbourhood of Amsterdam-Noord. He had an older brother, and a younger sister. They lived in a house on the Nieuwendammerdijk. His father, his grandfather, and an uncle of his worked in a carpentry shop located behind the house. Staartjes started his primary education at the age of eight. After that, he went to the mulo in Amsterdam, followed by the Kweekschool, a teachers' college. He dropped out of the Kweekschool in 1958, and went to the theatre school. He graduated in 1961.

== Career ==
After graduation from the Toneelschool, Staartjes performed with various companies including the Nieuw Rotterdams Toneel en Studio. Staartjes made his debut in 1961 in Meneer Topaze, based on a play written by Marcel Pagnol in the 1930s. He performed in a number of TV shows, and in 1967 starts the show Woord voor Woord for the Interkerkelijke Omroep Nederland, in which he performed Bible readings. He is the voice of Rocus in the children's show Fabeltjeskrant.

A key moment in Staartjes' career came in 1972, when broadcaster VARA asked him to develop a children's show. De Stratemakeropzeeshow, created with actors-singers Wieteke van Dort and Joost Prinsen, and the writers' collective of Willem Wilmink, Karel Eykman, and Hans Dorrestijn, was a program firmly grounded on a children's perspective, sometimes controversially so, and ran until 1974. The show did not eschew using colloquial language; "Poop and Pee Minuet", for instance, was criticized in the tabloid De Telegraaf. The show and its successor were hailed as groundbreaking in offering the point of view of children and in popularizing poetry for children to a wide audience. After the show ended in 1974, he performed in and co-directed De film van ome Willem, starring Edwin Rutten, a show that ran until 1989.

He provided the voice of Bernard in the Dutch dub of The Rescuers, as well as the additional voices of Deacon Owl and Deadeye the Rabbit.

With van Dort and Prinsen, with whom he made the Stratemakeropzeeshow, he created J.J. de Bom voorheen De Kindervriend, in 1979. He played the role of Hein Gatje, a postman who delivers letters in which children write of their problems and predicaments, which are tackled on the show. The three teamed up again with writers Wilmink, Eykman, and Dorrestijn. The VARA pulled it after 32 episodes.

In 1984, Staartjes started to play the role of Meneer Aart on Sesamstraat, the Dutch co-production of Sesame Street. Meneer Aart is a grumpy elderly man who always has something to complain about, especially about the animal characters Pino, Tommie and Ieniemienie. After the death in 1999 of Lex Goudsmit, who played the resident "grandfather" character on the show, Meneer Aart filled that role. Staartjes played Meneer Aart until 2018, when the NOS decided to stop making the show and show only re-runs. Staartjes also starred in Het Klokhuis, a show which began in 1988; his character was Professor Doctor Fetze Alsvanouds, a distracted professor. Staartjes developed the show with Ben Klokman. He also welcomed Sinterklaas at his annual arrival in the Netherlands, for almost 20 years until 2001. By this time, he had cut down on acting, though he still performed occasionally, in the 2002 TV drama Mevrouw de minister, and in 2006 as circus director Willy Waltz in the series Waltz.

== Personal life and death ==
Staartjes was 22 years old when his first child was born. He divorced his first wife sixteen years later. He later married a woman named Hanna.

On 10 January 2020, Staartjes was involved in a collision between a car and his quadricycle in Leeuwarden. He was taken to the hospital in critical condition and died two days later. He was 81 years old.

== Filmography (selection) ==
- De FabeltjesKrant (TV series), voice of Rocus (1969–72)
- De Stratemakeropzeeshow (TV series), starring as Stratemaker-op-zee, abbreviated "Straat"
- Oorlogswinter (Winter in Wartime) (1975 TV mini-series), director
- Pinkeltje (1978 film), starring as Pinkeltje (Fingerling)
- De Film van Ome Willem (TV series), performer and director
- J.J. de Bom, voorheen de Kindervriend (TV series), as Hein Gatje (1979–81)
- Het Klokhuis (TV series) 1988-, among others as Fetze Als-vanouds
- Waltz (TV miniseries) 2006, starring as Willy Waltz
