= Geef Mij Maar Nasi Goreng =

Indonesian song in Dutch

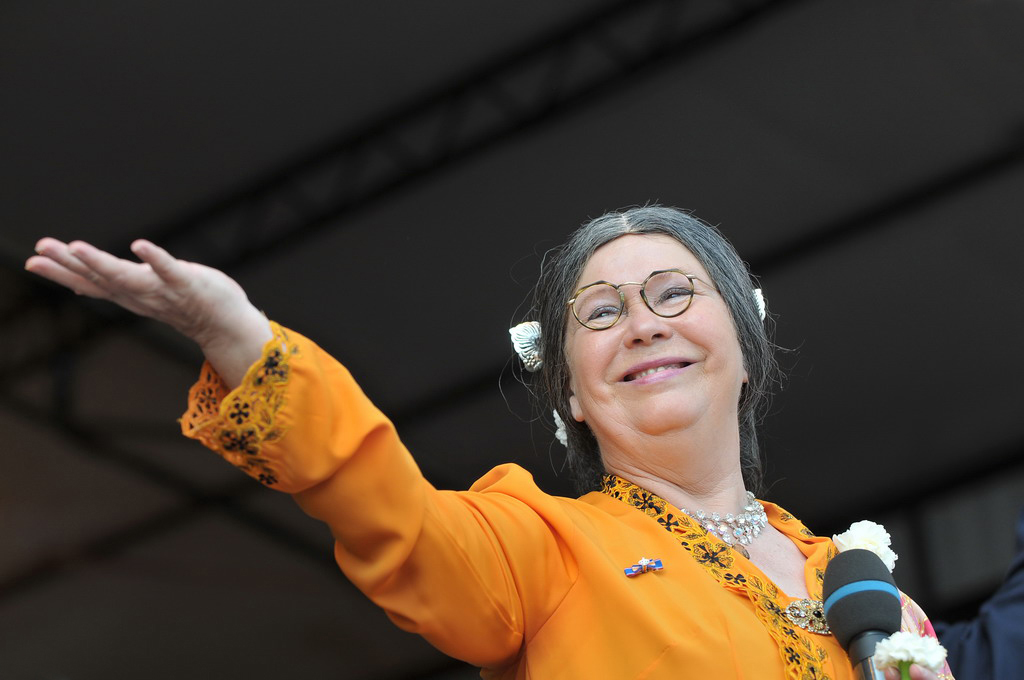
Wieteke van Dort (Tante Lien) in 2009

Geef Mij Maar Nasi Goreng (Dutch pronunciation: [ˈɣeːf mə maːr ˌnɑsi ˈɡoːrɛŋ]; transl. "Just Give Me Nasi Goreng") is a song composed by Wieteke van Dort in 1977. She was born in 1943 in Surabaya, Japanese-occupied Dutch East Indies, and moved to The Hague, The Netherlands, at the age of 14.

The song was written in Dutch and was sung with a thick Indies accent by Van Dort herself. She preserved her memories and love for various Indonesian dishes within the song, including nasi goreng, sambal, krupuk, lontong, pork sate, terasi, serundeng, milkfish, tahu petis, kue lapis, onde-onde, cassava, bakpau, ketan, and palm sugar.

== History ==
The conflict of Irian in 1957 strained the relationship between Indonesia and The Netherlands. Anti-Dutch sentiment in the country, fostered by the Indonesian government, forced most Dutch Indies families to move to The Netherlands, including the Van Dort family. At first, Van Dort could not stand the cold climate of The Netherlands nor its cuisine. She then wrote a song to express her longing for Indonesia.

== See also ==
- Hallo Bandoeng
