= Michel Velleman =

Dutch magician (1895-1943)

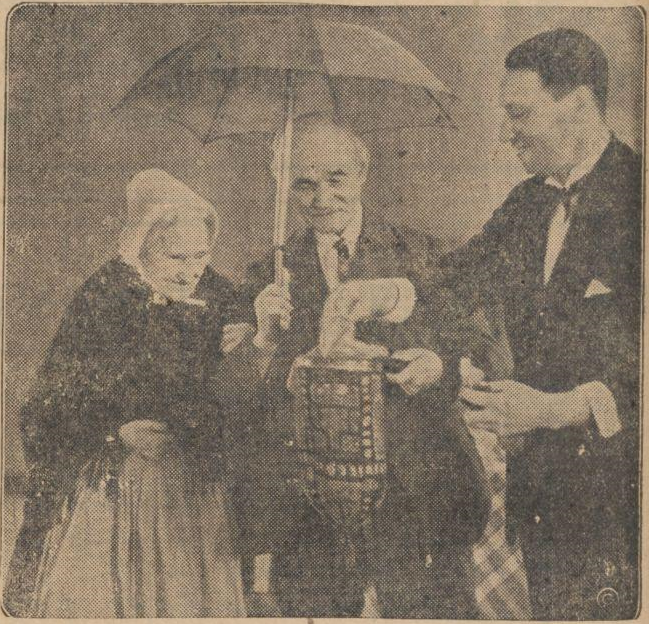
- Professor Ben Ali Libi during a show at the Old Men's and Women's almshouse in Amsterdam in 1933
- Born: Michel Velleman; 5 January 1895; Groningen, Netherlands
- Died: 2 July 1943 (aged 48); Sobibór extermination camp
- Occupation: Magician

Michel Velleman (5 January 1895 – 2 July 1943), known by his stage name Professor Ben Ali Libi, was a Dutch magician who was murdered in the Sobibor extermination camp during World War II. He is remembered in a poem by Dutch poet Willem Wilmink.

== Biography ==
Velleman was born in Groningen in the Netherlands and later moved to Amsterdam.

Velleman was a well-known magician, performing for notables such as the Dutch prince consort and the exiled German Emperor Wilhelm II. He wrote a booklet of simple magic tricks that was published in 1925.

His precise politics are not known, but he supported workers' rights, and gave free magic performances to striking workers during the 1920s. Besides paid work in variety shows, he often performed for charity, including at almshouses.

During World War II, Velleman worked for the Cultural Department of the "Jewish Council," the Nazi administrative structure imposed on Jewish communities in occupied territory.

Velleman and his wife Anna (née Speijer) were living in Amsterdam when they were abducted during a razzia on June 2, 1943. His family was sent through the Westerbork transit camp before arriving at the Sobibor extermination camp. His daughter Aaltje, who had Down syndrome, was murdered at Sobibor in May 1943. Velleman and Anna both died in 1943 at Sobibor. His son Jacques survived the war.

In 2017, a memorial to Velleman was established in his birth town of Groningen.

== Wilmink's Poem ==
Wilmink's poem, titled "Ben Ali Libi," was written sometime after the war, as it concerns Wilmink's experience in reading Velleman's name on a list of those murdered in camps in a book by Dutch resistance member Henk van Gelderen.

The penultimate verse of the poem reads in English translation:

And always when there’s a shouter to see

with an alternative for democracy

I think: your paradise, how much space is there

for Ben Ali Libi, the magician?

The poem became more well-known after Dutch actor Joost Prinsen recited it on television. Herman van Veen set the poem to music in 2009.

In 2015, Velleman was the subject of a Dutch documentary film titled Ben Ali Libi, Magician, directed by Dirk Jan Roeleven. The film was released in the Netherlands and shown in international film festivals.
