= De Stratemakeropzeeshow =

Dutch television program

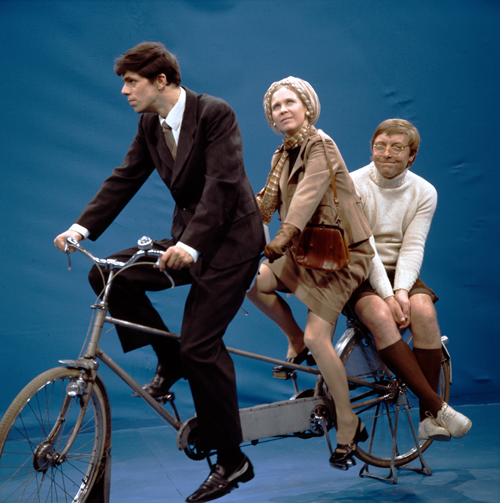
- Joost Prinsen, Wieteke van Dort and Aart Staartjes during the taping of "Je bent een liegbeest".
- Genre: Comedy; Children's television
- Directed by: Frans Boelen
- Starring: Aart Staartjes; Wieteke van Dort; Joost Prinsen
- Composer: Harry Bannink
- Country of origin: Netherlands
- Original language: Dutch

Production
- Production company: VARA

Original release
- Network: Nederland 1
- Release: 3 October 1972 – 26 December 1974

De Stratemakeropzeeshow (English: The road worker at sea show) is a Dutch children's television programme that ran from 1972 to 1974, being produced by the VARA broadcasting organization.

De Stratemakeropzeeshow is regarded as one of the finest Dutch children's television shows for its absurdist and taboo-breaking sketches. The show was regarded controversial because it tackled topics what were then considered not morally acceptable and for its song "Poop and Pee Minuet". After the death of Aart Staartjes in early 2020, television critics argued that the programme had forever changed Dutch children's television, freeing the genre of adult morals.

== History ==
The show aired at a time when Dutch children's television was changing. The previous generation watched Annie M. G. Schmidt's shows, but the writers of De Stratemakeropzeeshow dealt much more openly with children's problems, in a way deemed more relevant to children than previous television shows.

De Stratenmakeropzeeshow was first broadcast on 3 October 1972. After the first set of episodes, the show received backlash from critics and viewers for its non-traditionality. A critic from De tijd said that the show used too much adult humour to be considered a children's programme. On 24 October 1972, De Telegraaf published two individual television viewers' letters that complained about the use of vulgar language in the broadcast of 17 October. One month later, another viewer complained in Het Parool about the lack of morals in the show.

Due to widespread critique and controversy, VARA considered cancelling the show after its first six trial episodes. The broadcaster reconsidered this after children wrote letters to VARA, begging for more episodes. Its second series started on 8 May 1973 and consisted of eight episodes, and a third series started in September 1973, making the show the most broadcast children's programme at the time. While the initial episodes received backlash from critics, the appreciation of the series increased alongside its popularity.

In December 1974, the show's director Frans Boelen announced the show's cancellation as producing one show a week had become too physically draining for the creators and the cast. However, some argue that the continuous complaints of viewers also played a role in the show's eventual cancellation.

In 2009, the show was added to the Canon van zestig jaar kindertelevisie, a list of the most important Dutch children's programmes ever made.

== Cast and characters ==
The main actors were Joost Prinsen, Aart Staartjes, and Wieteke van Dort. It was directed by Staartjes and Frans Boelen, with music by Harry Bannink. Important lyrical contributions were by Willem Wilmink; other lyricists were Karel Eykman (writing as Hendrik Blaak) and Hans Dorrestijn.

Joost Prinsen's main character was Erik Engerd (free translation Eerie Eric), an alter ego that still stuck to the actor for years after. Eric always tried to scare others, but scared no one but himself.

Wieteke van Dort's Deftige Dame (Posh Lady) farted continually; this show and others made van Dort the "uncrowned queen of Dutch children's television". Her character "Tante Lien", which later got her own show, was introduced in De Stratemakeropzeeshow.

Aart Staartjes played the title character Stratemaker op zee (Road worker at sea), abbreviated Straat. His character represented the naive and uninhibited child who commented on the way adults lived their lives. Staartjes created the character after a conversation he once had with his uncle as a child. Staartjes asked his uncle what would become of him when he would be older, to which his uncle responded: "You will be nothing. You will become a road worker at sea.".

== Other collaborators ==
- Harry Bannink wrote music for the show, including the "Poop and Pee Minuet"
- Willem Wilmink wrote lyrics, including the "Poop and Pee Minuet"
- Peter Nieuwerf played guitar

== Songs ==
Some of the songs from the show have become classics. A number of them were performed in 2006 and 2007 by Michiel Flamman and others.

=== Notable songs ===
- "Poep en piesmenuet" ("Poop and Pee Minuet")
- "Je bent een liegbeest, een jokkenbrok" ("You're a liar")
- "Jongen, eet nou door" ("Son, please finish your dinner")
