= Joop Stokkermans =

Dutch composer and pianist

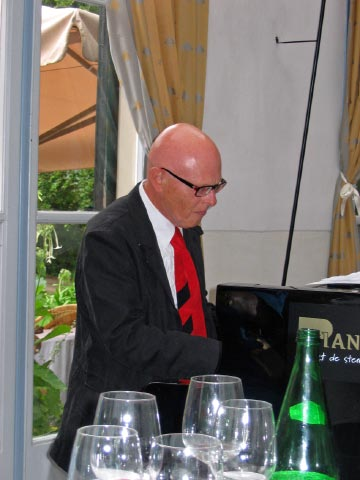
Photo of Joop Stokkermans behind the piano on Dick Bruna's 80th birthday

Johannes Andreas "Joop" Stokkermans (20 February 1937 in Leiden – 25 October 2012 in Hilversum) was a Dutch composer and pianist.

== Biography ==
Stokkermans studied piano and composition with Theo van der Pas at the Royal Conservatory of The Hague.

He received a Golden Harp award in 1974 for his entire œuvre.

== Selected works ==
Piano

- Hommage, 13 Pieces (1982)
- La plage et ses variations (1992)
- Oranje rhapsodie for carillon or piano

Songs

- "Katinka" (1962)
- "Morgen" (Someday) (1968)
- "Tijd" (1971)

Musicals

- De Engel van Amsterdam (1975)
- Nijntje (2001); based on the picture book Miffy
- Kunt u mij de weg naar Hamelen vertellen, mijnheer? (2003)

Music for television

- Paulus de boskabouter (Paulus the Woodgnome)
- Barbapapa
- De Bereboot (The Bear Boat)
- Kunt u mij de weg naar Hamelen vertellen, mijnheer? (Hamelen)
- De Kris Pusaka
- De Brekers

Film scores

- Pinkeltje (1978)
- For a Lost Soldier (1992)

== See also ==
- Nationaal Songfestival
