= Willem Wilmink =

Dutch poet and writer

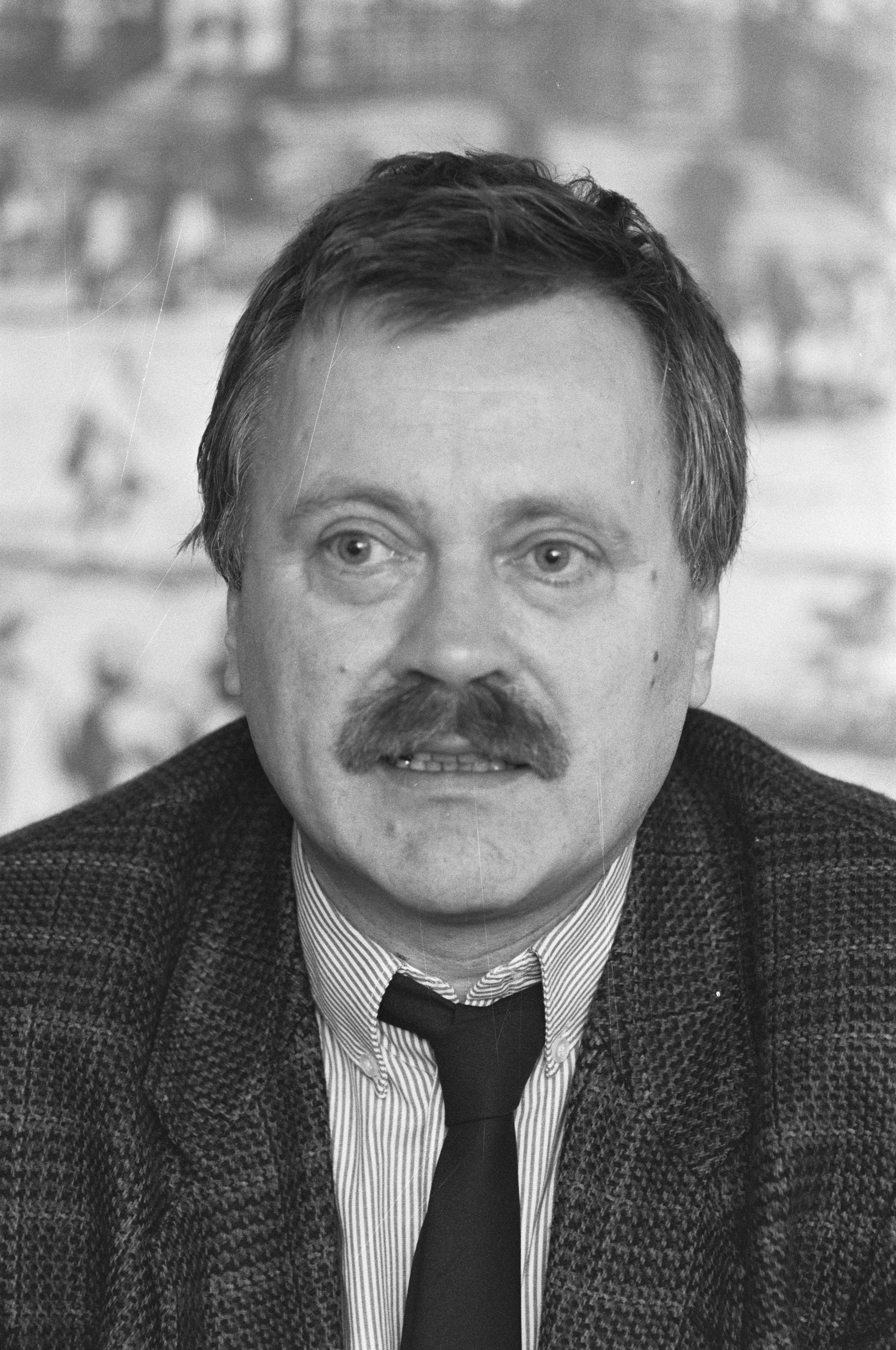
- Wilmink in 1988
- Born: 25 October 1936; Enschede, Netherlands
- Died: 2 August 2002 (aged 65); Enschede, Netherlands
- Education: University of Amsterdam (Candidate); Katholieke Universiteit Brabant (Doctorate)
- Occupations: Lyricist; writer; poet
- Writing career
- Years active: 1966–2002
- Genres: Novels; verse; lyrics
- Notable awards: Zilveren Griffel (1983, 1994); Nienke van Hichtum-prijs (1985); Gouden Griffel (1986); Theo Thijssen-prijs (1988)

Willem Wilmink (Dutch pronunciation: [ˈʋɪləɱ ˈʋɪlmɪŋk]; 25 October 1936 – 2 August 2003) was a Dutch poet and writer. He was best known for the large number of songs he wrote for popular children programs and his accessible, straightforward poetry.

== Life and career ==
Wilmink was born in Enschede and studied Dutch and history at the University of Amsterdam. From 1960 to 1978, he taught modern literature at the same university. He wrote many songs for musicals and wrote a number of novels for young adults. At first he mainly wrote for adults, but later mainly for children.

His first publication was in 1966: Brief van een Verkademeisje (Eng: "letter from a Verkade girl"). His poem "Ben Ali Libi," inspired by Dutch Jewish magician Michel Velleman, who was murdered at the Sobibor extermination camp, has become one of his most famous poems.

From 1970, he formed a writers' collective, together with Karel Eijkman, Hans Dorrestijn, Ries Moonen, Fetze Pijlman and Jan Riem. They contributed a lot to television programs such as De Stratemakeropzeeshow, Het Klokhuis, De Film van Ome Willem, Sesamstraat and Kinderen voor Kinderen.

He received numerous prizes for his work, including the Louis Davids Prijs in the 1970s, the Zilveren Griffel in 1983 and 1994, the Nienke van Hichtum-prijs in 1985, the Gouden Griffel in 1986, and the Theo Thijssen-prijs in 1988.

Wilmink played accordion, and performed regularly with his group in the nineties.

Many Dutch artists have performed Wilminks poetry, including Herman van Veen, Wieteke van Dort, Joost Prinsen and the cabaret group Don Quishocking. Many of his texts have been put to music by Harry Bannink and Frank Deiman.

In later life, his health declined due to a number of strokes.

== Works ==
=== Prose ===
- 1971 - About cabaret (IVIO)
- 1972 - A strange tiger and other poems (Aarts / 2nd edition 1978)
- 1972 - Seven songs for a peak (Aarts)
- 1973 - It happens to everyone: twenty songs for children (Aarts)
- 1975 - Business from Heaven: songs for children (Aarts)
- 1975 - Messages for anxious children (Cosmos)
- 1976 - The party of the Amstel: a fairy tale (Aarts)
- 1976 - The scared animalforrest (Kosmos / 5th edition 1987)
- 1977 - The thirteen months of the year: romantic piano pieces for beginners (Rap)
- 1977 - neighborhood boys (Cosmos)
- 1977 - The songs for children (Aarts / 4th edition 1984)
- 1977 - Far from town (Cosmos)
- 1978 - Jan Elephant (Aarts)
- 1979 - Murder in the swamp (Cosmos)
- 1980 - Ghost between ghosts (Foundation CPNB)
- 1980 - The amazing journey of Jacob Moonshine and Sientje Starfish (Aarts)
- 1980 - Dorus dragon (Heureka / 2nd edition 1984)
- 1981 - Two girls in Twente: stories and poems (Bekadidact)
- 1981 - Far from the city and neighborhood boys (Cosmos)
- 1982 - Near the houses (Kosmos / 2nd edition 1983)
- 1983 - Far friends: 44 new songs (Bakker)
- 1983 - Two brothers (Horstink)
- 1983 - Koen, do my shoe ?: Willem Wilmink's close correspondence course (Van Holkema & Warendorf)
- 1983 - Ali Baba (Leopold)
- 1984 - The fist this fist songs from film Uncle William (Aarts)
- 1984 - Look with your eyes closed: songs for children (Harlequin)
- 1984 - Three trips Louis (Horstink)
- 1984 - A while later (Foundation CPNB)
- 1984 - The wrong pan (bakery / 4th edition 1992)
- 1985 - Where the heart is full of Willem Wilmink's close correspondence course (Van Holkema & Warendorf / 3rd edition 1986)
- 1985 - We'll see what it is: songs for growing children (Bakker)
- 1986 - Climb into your pen (PTT Post)
- 1986 - Hear! So never sung! Hear !: an anthology of his poems (Bakker)
- 1986 - Willem Wilmink omnibus (bakery / 2nd edition 1988)
- 1986 - Collected songs and poems (bakery / 5th edition 1999)
- 1987 - Somewhere in France (PTT Post)
- 1987 - Good evening, musician Willem Wilmink's close correspondence course (Van Holkema & Warendorf)
- 1988 - They say that the earth revolves 37 new poems (Bakker)
- 1988 - Today is the big day: Crash Course occasion seal (Van Holkema & Warendorf)
- 1988 - The treacherous child: a few poems by Hendrik de Vries (Baker, also appeared as a thesis Tilburg)
- 1989 - The child is father of the man: an anthology of his own work (Bakker)
- 1989 - Jack, Jacky and the juniors along roads iron (Wiggers, Inmerc)
- 1989 - Rutgers trip (Bakker)
- 1989 - The Story of Kees (scenario of Duren André television film)
- 1990 - Should be feared that it never existed ?: 34 new poems (Bakker)
- 1991 - Jack, Jacky and the juniors: Christmas stories (Wiggers)
- 1991 - In the kitchen of the muse: closing the entire correspondence course (Baker / 2nd edition 1996)
- 1992 - A dog traveling: poems for reasonable five-year-olds (Bakker)
- 1992 - Direction England (scenario for a television film by André Duren)
- 1993 - I get it: songs for young children (Bakker)
- 1993 - The anthem (Van Goor / 3rd edition 1998)
- 1994 - Willem Wilmink (Rider)
- 1995 - ABC (Querido)
- 1995 - Beware of pirates: songs (Walvaboek)
- 1995 - Severe enough: songs and poems from 1986 (Baker)
- 1995 - Ali Baba and the forty artists (Zircon; Beehive)
- 1996 - I had as a child a home and hearth (bakery / 5th edition 2004)

=== Poetry ===
- 1971 - Goejanverwellesluis, wheat sheaves, songs and poems
- 1972 - Seven songs for a peak
- 1972 - A strange tiger and other poems
- 1977 - For a nude person (anthology)
- 1988 - Collected songs and poems
- 1988 - They say that the earth revolves
- 1990 - Should be feared that it never existed?
- 1992 - Heftan tattat! Gedichn in Urban Low Saxon (De Oare Utjouwerij)
- 1993 - Javastraat, enhanced with an old and a new song, two old poems and a preface: Why and how to write (The Oare Utjouwerij)
- 1994 - Severe enough, Nine new poems (The Oare Utjouwerij)
- 1996 - Carmina Burana, Orff's choice translated (The Oare Utjouwerij)
- 1996 - An own Song of Songs (The Oare Utjouwerij)
- 1999 - The Princess Pathmos, Enschedese folk musical (The Oare Utjouwerij)
- 2002 - Heftan tattat! 24 poems in Urban Low Saxon (De Oare Utjouwerij, 7th edition 2008)

=== Poetry for children ===
- 1973 - It happens to everyone
- 1975 - Business from heaven
- 1975 - Messages for anxious children (anthology)
- 1977 - The thirteen months of the year
- 1985 - We'll see what it is: songs for growing children
- 1992 - A dog traveling
- 1995 - Musical images: poems by Mussorgsky (The Children, The Picture Gallery), Saint-Saëns (Carnival of the Animals)

=== Prose for children ===
- 1975 - The scared Dierenbos
- 1976 - The party of the Amstel
- 1977 - Far from town
- 1977 - neighbor boys
- 1979 - Murder in the swamp
- 1980 - Ghost between ghosts
- 1981 - Two girls in Twente (stories and poetry)
- 1982 - Near the houses
- 1984 - Three trips Louis
- 1986 - Where the heart is full of
- 1988 - Good evening, Speelman
- 1988 - Today is the big day
- 1991 - In the kitchen of the muse. fill the entire correspondence course

=== Essays ===
- 1988 - From Roodeschool to Lille. A personal look at the Dutch song
- 1989 - You know that you do not exist
- 1990 - What I've found, you never guess

== Photo gallery ==
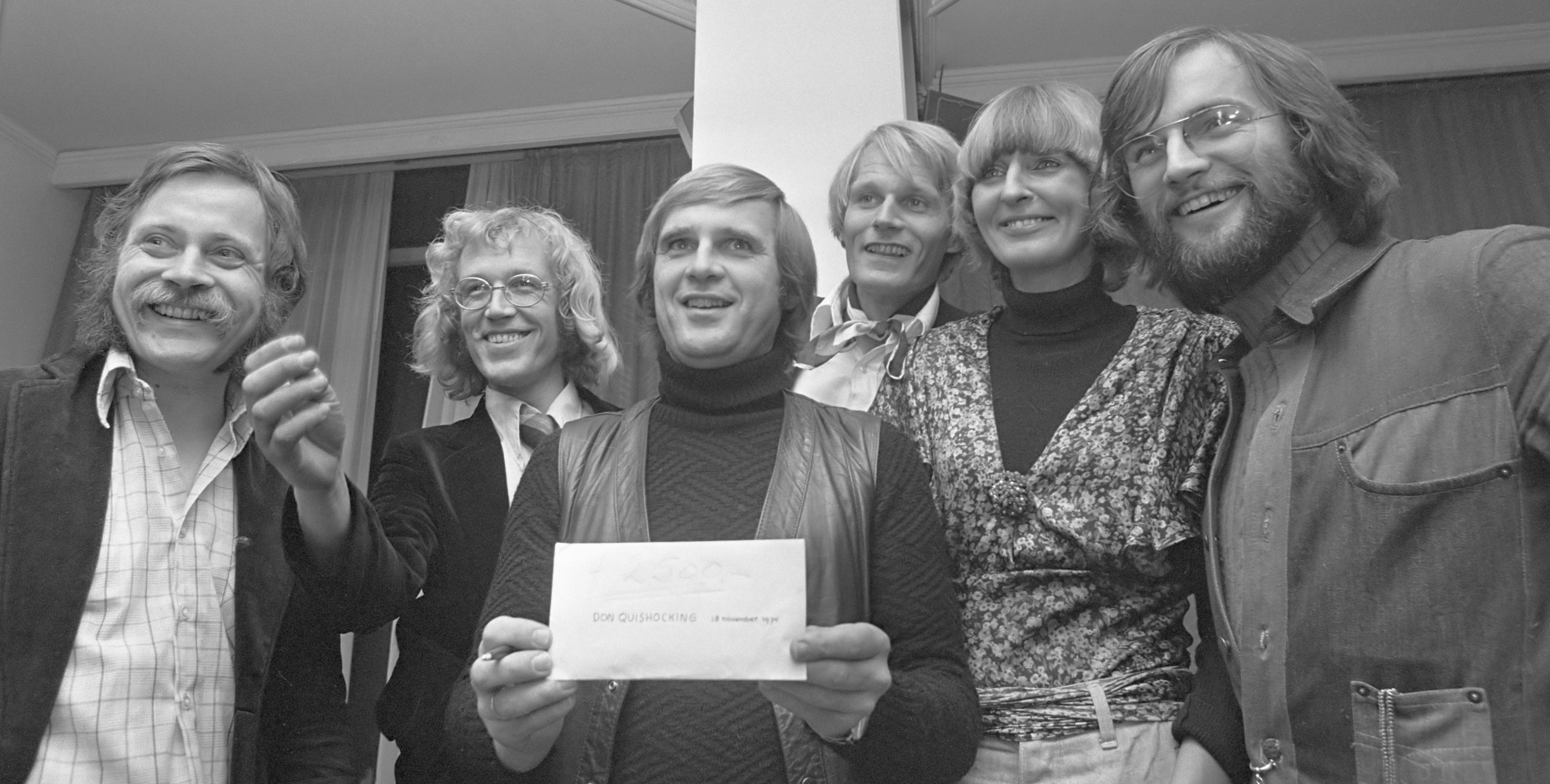
Don Quishocking in 1974. Wilmink is on the left

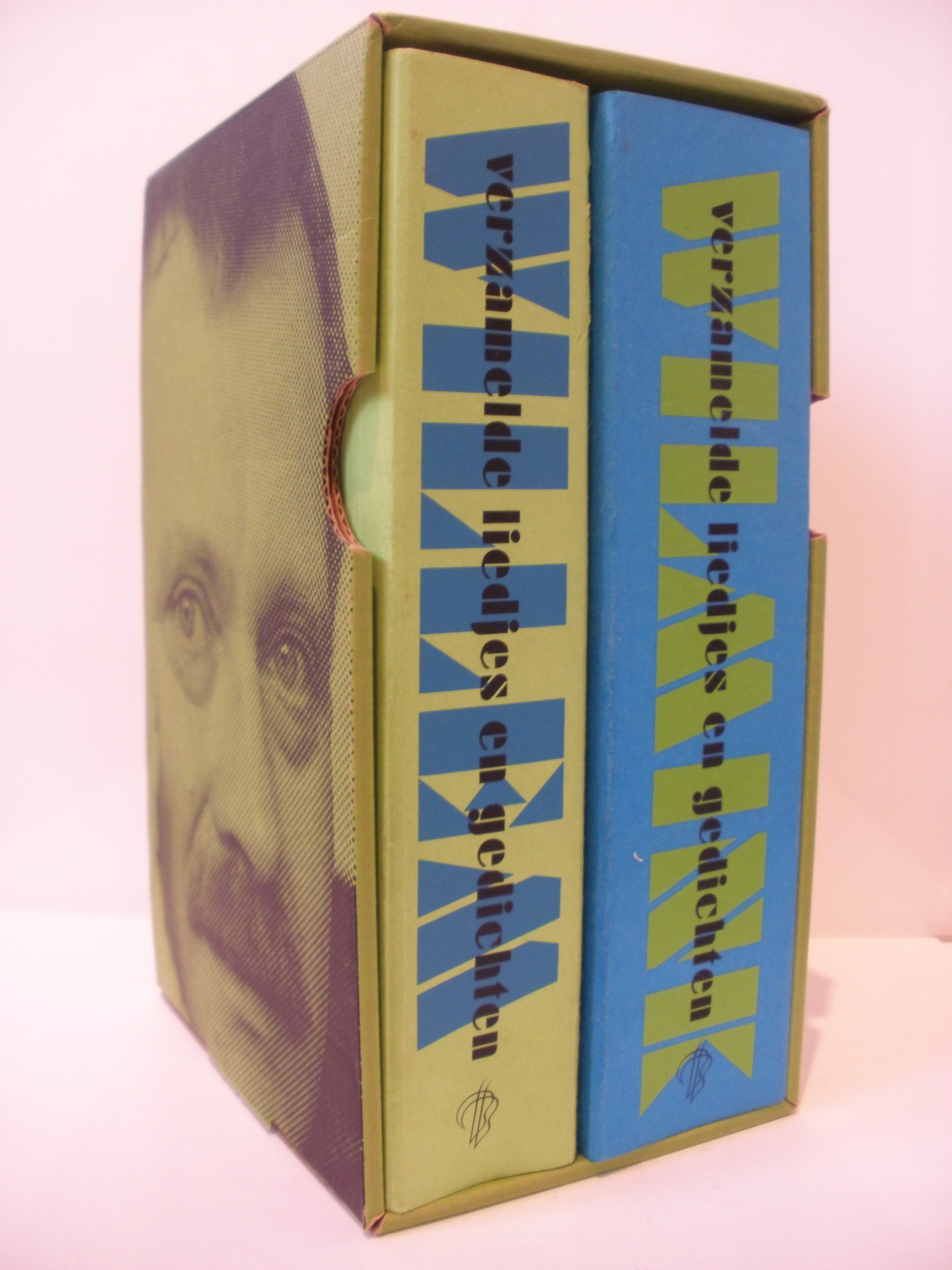
Collected works (songs and poems)

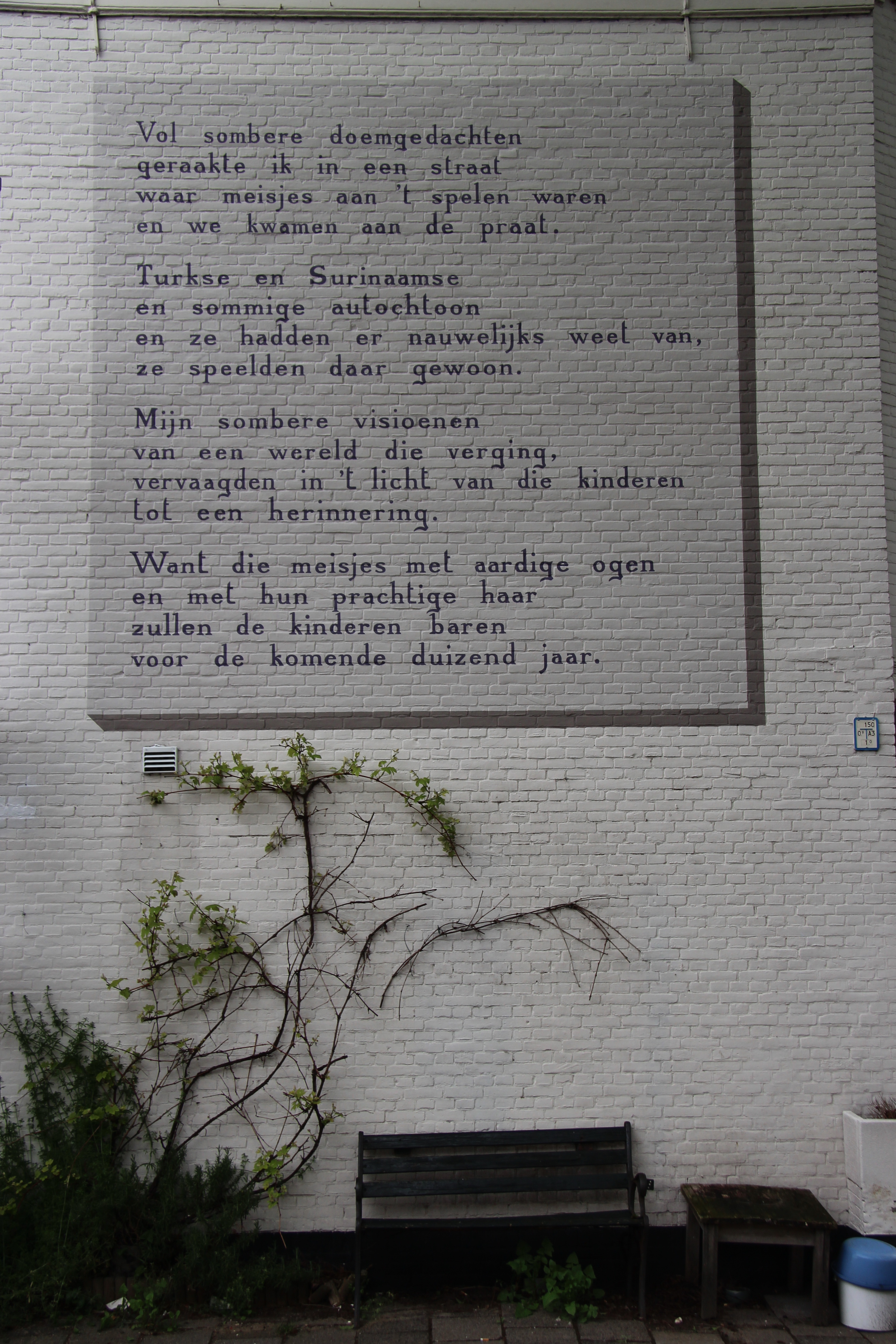
The wall poem Spelende meisjes in Leiden
