= Frans Kokshoorn =

Dutch actor (1920–2007)

Frans Kokshoorn (The Hague, 18 June 1920 - Oegstgeest, 25 November 2007) was a Dutch television actor, known for his roles in Q & Q and Bassie & Adriaan.
