= Pinkeltje =

Fictional character from a Dutch book

Pinkeltje (known in English as Fingerling) is a fictional character from the eponymous children's book series by the Dutch writer Dick Laan. Pinkeltje is a white-bearded gnome and wears a pointed hat and is as big as a pinky finger, hence its name, meaning "fingerling" (literally "little pinky") in Dutch. Twenty-nine books were published in a series between 1939 and 1977. The last four volumes appeared posthumously. A successful film was also released with the same title and based on the books.

== Book series ==
The early stories focus mainly on Pinkeltje's adventures in the Grote Huis (Big House), inhabited by a father, a mother, a nameless boy and an unnamed girl (originally a boy and two girls). Pinkeltje doesn't appear to the residents, but is always ready to help them in silence. Later, the emphasis shifts to his adventures in Pinkeltjesland from where he originates and is married to Pinkelotje. In the last books, Pinkeltje emerges as a detective and helps solve crimes. The books have drawings of Rein van Looy.

Other characters include the dog Wiebelstaartje; the cat Snorrebaard; and the five mice characters Knabbeltje, Grijshuidje, Zwartsnoetje, Kraaloogje and Langstaartje. Another Wolkewietje, a cloud, is as big as an arm.

Although Pinkeltje is always helpful and friendly to everyone, he never shows to people because he does not know if he can trust them. The main exception is Mr. Dick Laan himself, to whom Pinkeltje appears and tells his adventures.

The series included:

1. De avonturen van Pinkeltje (1939)
2. Pinkeltje en zijn vriendjes (1949)
3. Pinkeltje op reis (1950)
4. Pinkeltje in Artis (1952)
5. Pinkeltje en het grote huis (1953)
6. Pinkeltje op zoek naar Klaas Vaak (1954)
7. Pinkeltje in Madurodam (1955)
8. Pinkeltje gaat naar Pinkeltjesland (1956)
9. Pinkeltje en de flonkersteen (1957)
10. Pinkeltje ontmoet Wolkewietje (1958)
11. Wolkewietje is ondeugend geweest (1959)
12. Een grote verrassing voor Pinkeltje (1960)
13. Pinkeltje en de raket (1962)
14. Pinkeltje en de gouden pen (1963)
15. Pinkeltje en de parels (1963)
16. Pinkeltje en de aardmannetjes (1964)
17. Lach jij maar, Pinkeltje (1965)
18. O! o, die Wolkewietje toch (1966)
19. Het grote avontuur van Pinkelotje (1967)
20. Pinkeltje en de boze tovenaar (1968)
21. Pinkeltje en de autoraket (1969)
22. Pinkeltje en de ijsheks (1970)
23. Pinkeltje en 10 spannende verhalen (1971)
24. Pinkeltje en het gestolen toverboek (1972)
25. Pinkeltje en het verdwenen kindercircus (1973)
26. Pinkeltje en de spannende avonturen om de gouden beker (1974)
27. Pinkeltje op zoek naar de maandiamant (1975)
28. Pinkeltje en de Bibelebonse pap (1976)
29. Pinkeltje op zoek naar de vurige ogen (1977)
30. Pinkeltje in de Efteling (Studio Dick Laan; 2014) ISBN 978-90-00-33464-3
31. Pinkeltje in het Rijksmuseum (Studio Dick Laan; 2015) ISBN 978-90-00-34532-8
32. Pinkeltje in het Dolfinarium (Studio Dick Laan; 2016) ISBN 978-90-00-34916-6
33. Pinkeltje in het Spoorwegmuseum (Studio Dick Laan; 2017) ISBN 978-90-00-35287-6

A special book Pinkeltje – het verhaal van de film was published in 1978 to accompany the film.

== Book adaptations and translations ==
Starting 1995, the book series was republished in an adaptation by Suzanne Braam and new illustrations by Julius Ros.

Translations of Pinkeltje have been made in English, German, French, Portuguese, Swedish, Danish, Norwegian, Finnish and Icelandic.

== Film adaptation ==
Pinkeltje (1978) was produced by P. Hans Frankfurther, and includes Emmy Lopes Dias, Aart Staartjes, Wieteke van Dort, and Lex Goudsmit. A soundtrack was also released with vocals of Harrie Geelen and Joop Stokkermans.
