= Wieteke van Dort =

Dutch actress and singer (1943–2024)

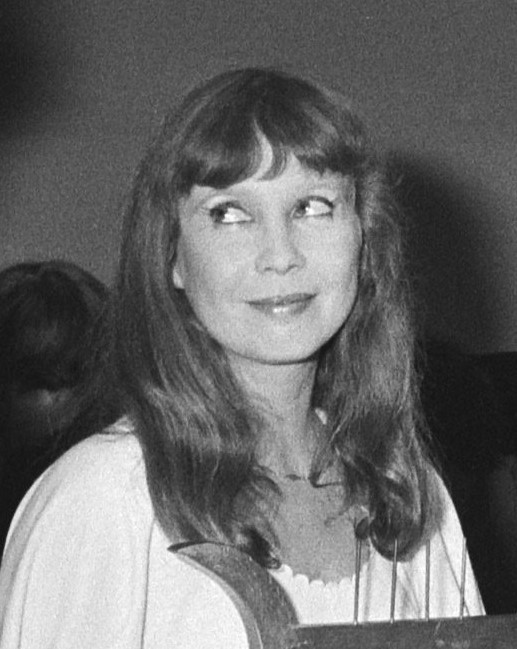
- Van Dort in 1979
- Born: Louisa Johanna Theodora van Dort; 16 May 1943; Surabaya, Japanese-occupied Dutch East Indies (now Indonesia)
- Died: 15 July 2024 (aged 81); The Hague, Netherlands
- Occupations: Actress, singer, comedian, writer, artist
- Years active: 1968–2024
- Spouse: Theo Moody (m. 1970; died 2024)
- Children: 1

Louisa Johanna Theodora "Wieteke" van Dort (16 May 1943 – 15 July 2024) was a Surabaya-born Javindo actress, comedian, singer, writer and artist. On 29 April 1999, Queen Beatrix appointed her Knight of the Order of Orange-Nassau.

She appeared on many children's television programmes and was best known for her Indo character of Tante Lien in The Late Late Lien Show on Dutch prime time television. Her show was the only television programme ever to showcase Indo (Eurasian) culture and introduced many Indo artists and music to mainstream audiences in the Netherlands.

After three seasons, the television series ended in 1988, but her Tante Lien character is popular to this day and in 2007, she was awarded the Silver Medal of Merit for her contributions in this role from the Dutch State Secretary for Defence.

== Early life ==
Wieteke was born in Surabaya in what was then the Dutch East Indies under Japanese occupation. In October 1945, when Van Dort was two years old, her father was abducted and killed by militia members. This period, just after the end of World War II, was known as Bersiap.

Van Dort attended two primary schools in Surabaya, and began attending the HBS. When she was thirteen years old, the Van Dort family went on vacation to the Netherlands. While they were abroad, Sukarno nationalized the properties of foreigners in Indonesia and the family ended up settling in The Hague.

In The Hague, she left middle school without a diploma. Because she was too young for the academy of dramatic arts, she first underwent training to become a nursery school teacher. Still, she did complete three years of the HBS. In 1962 and 1963, she attended Toneelgroep Rederijkers (the academy of dramatic arts). While at the academy, she played Laura Wingfield in a performance of The Glass Menagerie. In 1964, she dropped out of the academy and signed a contract with the Nieuwe Komedie. In 1968, she began working with Wim Kan and Corry Vonk as a comedian.

== Early career ==
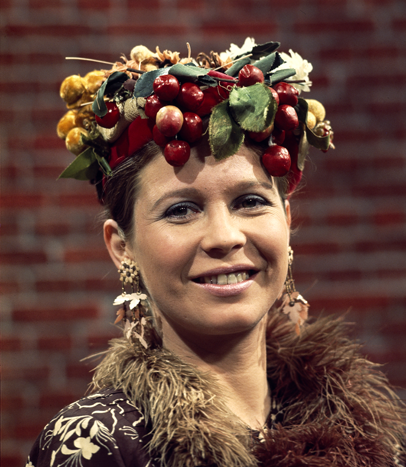
Van Dort in 1973

After her marriage to Theo Moody, she concentrated with much success on radio and television. In De Stratemakeropzeeshow with Aart Staartjes and Joost Prinsen, she played the 'distinguished lady'. In the 1970s, she appeared on the children's programme Lawaaipapegaai. The writer's collective consisted of Hans Dorrestijn, Karel Eykman, Ries Moonen, Fetze Pijlman, Jan Riem, during which time Willem Wilmink (a scriptwriter) died. Wieteke van Dort also participated in the television programme Het Klokhuis by overseeing the text in the scriptwriting collective.

== Tante Lien ==
Her most successful character is Tante Lien, which she introduced through her popular television programme The Late Late Lien Show. She had to push hard to get the concept produced as the TV production companies and broadcasters initially did not believe there was a market for this. Eventually three seasons were aired in 1979, 1980, 1981 and finally in 1988. The show became the only platform ever for Indo culture on national television.

Each episode shows funny, old Tante Lien hosting a cosy gathering (Koempoelan) at her home in which she and her guests snack on Indo food and reminisce about life back in the good old days (tempo doeloe) of the Dutch East Indies. Her guests are usually famous Indo and Totok (full blooded Dutch settlers of the colonial Dutch East Indies) artists that perform solo or together with Tante Lien or each other. Artists that have appeared in the show include the Blue Diamonds, Sandra Reemer and Willem Nijholt.

Within the Indo community itself the show was viewed by some to be rather controversial, mainly because the Tante Lien character speaks Dutch with a strong Indo accent. Certain factions in the Indo community claimed this as the reason they could not identify with the show and considered it not representative of well educated and assimilated Indos. In one episode, the show makes fun of this criticism by having a posh speaking Indo woman party crash Tante Lien's gathering.

== Later career and death ==
In the parliamentary elections of 1994 she was fourth on the list of the Natural Law Party.

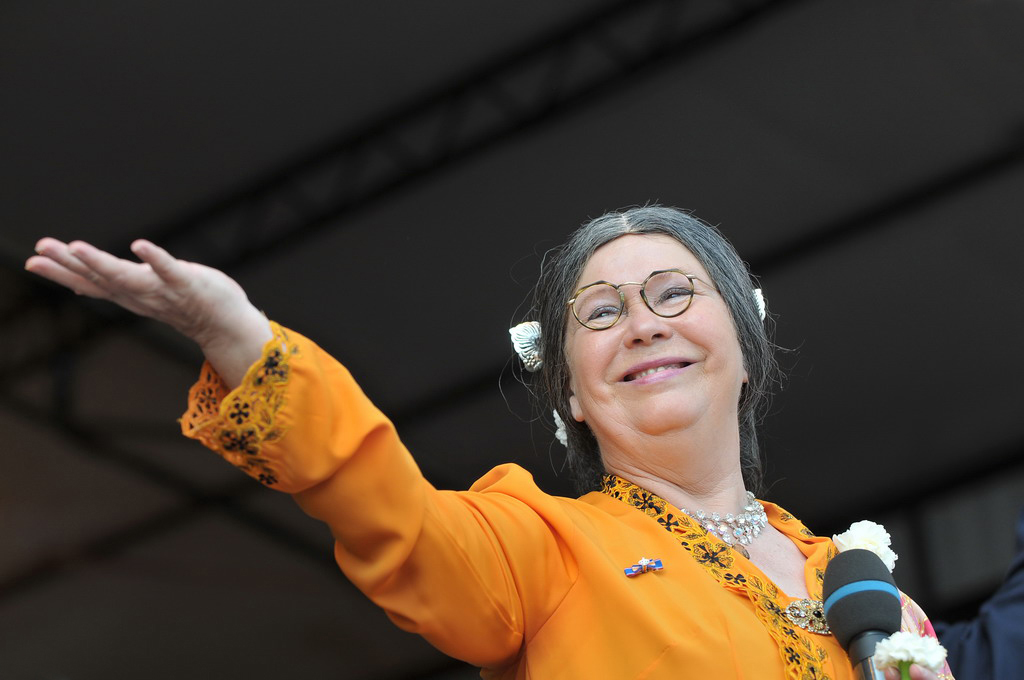
Van Dort in 2009 (Age 66)

On 29 June 2007, during the official Dutch Veterans Day in the Hague, Wieteke van Dort received the Silver Medal of Merit from the Minister of Defence for her role of Tante Lien in which she has performed on veterans' gatherings for over thirty years. "Through her efforts she highlights our solidarity and strengthens the bond between Dutch society and the ex-soldiers making a substantial contribution to the welfare of veterans. In her performances she also bridges the gap between the older and younger veterans.".

In 2008 she starred in the feature film Santa Claus and the Secret of the Great Book by director Martin Nellestijn. In 2009 she played the role of Queen in the film Santa Claus and the Lost Packet Boat from the same director.

Van Dort often cooperated with benefits and non-profit events for good causes. In 2010 she voluntarily contributed to music made to relief women suffering from the loss of a baby, just before, during or soon after birth.

Wieteke van Dort was still active in the fine arts and regularly performed her popular character Tante Lien. Her voice can be heard narrating the stories in the Dutch fairytale theme park Efteling.

Van Dort announced in May 2024 she was diagnosed with liver cancer that had metastasised to her lungs and brain. She died two months later, on 15 July 2024, at the age of 81. Her husband died a week prior to her.

== Theatre roles ==
- 1960 "An Angel Of Inaction" by Claude Puget, the role of angel.
- 1961 Les Jours Heureux by Claude Puget, the role of Pernette.
- 1962 "The Glass Menagerie" by Tennessee Williams, the role of Laura Wingfield.
- 1964 De Knecht van twee meesters van Goldoni by Henk Votel, the role of a small servant.
- 1964 "Our Town" by Thornton Wilder, all of the children's roles.
- 1964 "The Paris Wedding" by E. Labiche / Marc-Michel, silent role of Suzanne, in a review.
- 1965–1966 De Schilderijenoorlog by Jan Staal, first leading role, the 11-year-old girl Jannie Koperslager.
- 1966 "Romeo and Juliet" by William Shakespeare, the role of Juliet with Lex Schoorel as Romeo, translated by Adrian Brine.
- 1967 De grote en de kleine koning by B., children's play, the role of B. Minoli.
- 1967 Een huwelijk onder Lodewijk de XV by A. Dumas père, the silent role of Moortje.
- 1967 Ploeft, kindervoorstelling by M.C. Machado, the role of Maribel.
- 1967 En het geschiedde in die dagen… Cabareteske Kerstcantate by J. van Hoogland with music by Han Reiziger
- 1968 ABC Cabaret by Wim Kan and Corry Vonk.
- 1971 Porselein, short movie,
- 1975 Zwaarmoedige verhalen voor bij de centrale verwarming by L.J.T. Wieteke van Dort
- 1979 Martijn en de magiër, Dutch children's movie, as Directrice bejaardenhuis

== Television roles ==
- 1968 "De Avonturen van Pinokkio" Pinokkio
- 1968 "Oebele" Aagje Ritsema
- 1971 "Pip + Zip" (voice) Pip
- 1972 "'n Zomerzotheid" Dot
- 1972 "De Stratenmaker op zee show" De deftige dame
- 1975 "Kunt u mij de weg naar Hamelen vertellen, meneer?" (8 episodes)
- 1975 "De steen der dommen"
- 1975 "Onder een hoedje"
- 1975 "De gaten van war"
- 1975 "De koude kermis"
- 1975 "Een luchtkasteel"
- 1978 "Pinkeltje" Pinkelotje
- 1978 "Mikke Makke Marsepein"
- 1979 J.J. de Bom voorheen: 'De kindervriend' Titia Konijn
- 2001 "Costa!" Ruth (1 episode)
- 2001 "Zwoele nachten met een pop-idool" Ruth
- 2006 "Sinterklaas en het uur van de waarheid" Hare Majesteit
- 2007 "'t Schaep Met De 5 Pooten" Manja Wegenwijs (1 episode)
- 2007 "Een kastelein is ook maar een mens" Manja Wegenwijs
- 2007 "Het Klokhuis" Fan (2 episodes)
- 2007 "Breaking News: Magneten" Winkelende mevrouw
- 2007 "Grime" Fan

== Music and discography ==
Musical performances on television

- 1975 "Kunt u mij de weg naar Hamelen vertellen, meneer?" (2 episodes)
- 1975 "De steen der dommen" (performer: "Het geluk is met de dommen" (Het geluk is gek))
- 1975 "De gaten van war" (performer: "Een windmolen draait als de wind waait")
- 1978 "Pinkeltje" (performer: "Pokkenlied", "Heen en weer ballon", "Logeren bij Meneer Dick Laan", "Jeuklied")
- 2007 "'t Schaep Met De 5 Pooten" (1 episode)
- 2007 "Een kastelein is ook maar een mens" (performer: "Wat water in de wijn")

Vinyl long play albums

- 1968 – 1970 Oebele (4 records):
  - LP Welkom In Oebele, Polydor 236 811
  - LP Nieuwe Liedjes Van Oebele, Polydor 236 827
  - LP Oebele Is Hupsakee, Polydor 2419 004
  - LP OE Van Oebele, Polydor F- 784/3 (Book and Album)
- 1969 Kinderzangfestival
- 1973 De Stratemakeropzeeshow, Parts 1 and 2 – Part 1: Decca 6499 457, Part 2: Philips 9293 001
- 1974 Pip En Zip, CNR 541637
- 1975 Barbapapa (Vertellingen), Philips 9299 639
- 1975 Een Fraai Stuk Burengerucht, Philips 6410 088 – First solo LP
- 1977 Ot En Sien In Indië, Philips 6410 130
- 1978 Weerzien Met Indië, Philips 6410 956
- 1978 Kun Je Nog Zingen, Zing Dan Mee, Philips 6423 114
- 1978 Radio Lawaaipapegaai, Parts 1 and 2 – Part 1: Philips 9293 011, Part 2: Philips 9293025
- 1978 Pinkeltje, Philips 9293 017
- 1979 Hallo Bandoeng, Philips 6423 135 / Music For The Millions, 826 751-1
- 1979 J.J. de Bom, Voorheen De Kindervriend, Parts 1 and 2 – Part 1: Polydor 2441 087, Part 2: Ariola Benelux b.v. 203 620
- 1980 Kortjakje Is Weer Beter, Philips 6423 392 / Music for the Millions 824 399-1
- 1981 We Gaan De Boom Versieren, Philips 6423 391
- 1981 De Koempoelan Van Tante Lien, Philips 6423 450
- 1982 Huilen Is Gezond, Philips 6423 512
- 1984 Martientje In Het Tandenrijk (i.o. van Zendium), Bridge SP Amsterdam 08-022625-20
- 1984 De Betoverde Speelgoedwinkel, (Jeugdconcerten) RCA Records GL 44075
- 1985 Wie Komt Er In M'n Kamertje?, Quintessence Records BM 602001
- 1987 Vera De Muis, Quintessence Records QS 900 001-1
- 1988 De Late Late Lien Evergreen Show, Quintessence Records QS 600 807

Singles

- 1975 “Diamanten bruidspaar”
- 1975 “Arm Den Haag” (Philips 6012 699)
- 1978 “Ajoen Ajoen” (Philips 6012 832)
- 1978 “Krontjong Kemajoran” (Philips 6017 030)
- 1979 Hallo Bandoeng (6012 945)
- 1979 Geef Mij Maar Nasi Goreng (6012 869)
- 1979 "Mijn Kleine Nasibal" (Philips 6012 877)
- 1985 Dwaze moeders van het plein (Philips 6017 304)
- 1986 Spanish version Las madres locas de la plaza (Phonogram 6845.151)
- 2022 “Surabayaku” with Michiel Eduard (digital release)
- 2022 “Weerzien” with Michiel Eduard
- 2023 “Dewi Melati” with Michiel Eduard (digital release)

CDs

- 1980 We Gaan De Boom Versieren, Philips 814 636-2
- 1980 Kortjakje Is Weer Beter, Philips 824 399-2
- 1987 Vera De Muis Quintessence, QS 900 001-4
- 1988 De Late Late Lien Evergreen Show, Quintessence QS 800.815
- 1991 Weerzien Met Indië, Philips 848 399-2
- 1992 De Koempoelan Van Tante Lien, Mercury 514 160-2
- 1992 Het Klokhuis, Quintessence QS 900.250-2
- 1993 Liedjes Van Verlangen, Philips 518 055-2
- 1995 Batavia (N.A.V. De Doop Van Het V.O.C.- Schip), Bingo Music NL BAT 7495
- 1995 Kerst in De Gordel Van Smaragd, Vincent Produkties 55 1053-2 (with Lonny, Justine, Wieteke, Rudy van Dalm, Andres, en Chris Latul)
- 1996 We’ll Meet Again, Mercury 534 124-2
- 1997 Dubbel – CD Wieteke Van Dort 25 Jaar Als Tante Lien, Mercury 534952-2
- 1998 Sprookjes Van Tante Lien (Part 1), R. Prod.Records R.P. 07
- 1998 Verhalen En Liedjes Over Het Volk Van Laaf, PolyMedia 559 369-2
- 1999 Ot En Sien in Indië, Universal Music 546 019-2
- 1999 Kun Je Nog Zingen, Zing Dan Mee, Mercury 826 752-2
- 1999 Winnie De Poeh 2 Cd's Vertellingen Bij 2 Boeken, Publisher Libre Leeuwarden
- 2001 Dubbel – Cd Het Mooiste Van Wieteke Van Dort, Universal Music 586013-2
- 2002 Sprookjes Van Tante Lien (Part 2), R. Prod.Records R.P.13
- 2004 Silver Moments, A Munich Records Production 42451 54402
- 2006 Stratemakeropzeeshow, (Audio book) Universal Music ISBN 90-5444-601-3
- 2007 Kind in Surabaja, (Audio book) Publisher De Fontein, Baarn ISBN 978-90-261-2293-4
- 2007 Piggelmee, (Audio book) Publisher Rubinstein ISBN 978-90-5444-196-0

DVDs

- 2005 Pasar Malam Besar Live, registration 2001 Wieteke van Dort Productions 8 711255 238828
- 2005 Pasar Malam Besar Live, registration 2002 Wieteke van Dort Productions 8 711255 238828
- 2006 The Late Late Lien Show´S 3 DVD´S Met 8 VARA TV Show´S Uit 1979, ´80 En ´81, Universal Music 0602498 783740 0 602498 783757 0 602498 783764
