= Jan Borkus =

Dutch radio personality

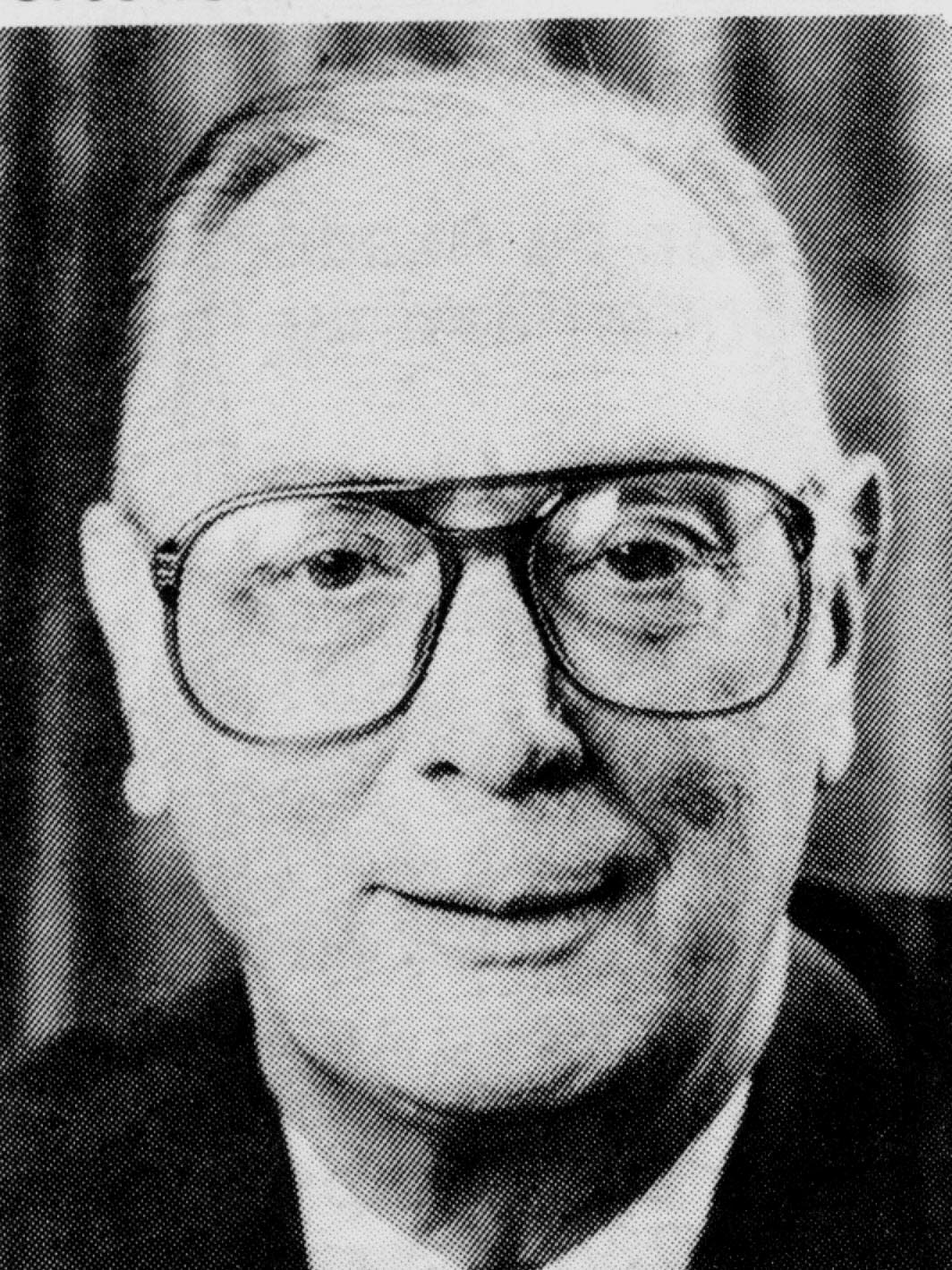
Jan Borkus

Jan Borkus (September 19, 1920 – October 29, 2007) was a Dutch radio personality and actor, who specialized in radio drama. He was born and died in The Hague, Netherlands.

== Filmography ==
- 1966 - De Kijkkast - Gompie and Ritsaart (1966–1972)
- 1976 - De Bereboot - Voice of Fred de Kei and Kokki
- 1978 - Astronautjes - Robo

== Radio Dramas ==
- 1953 - Sprong in het heelal – Jimmy Barnet (Serie 1, 2 en 3)
- 1961 - Testbemanning - Jaap
- 1985 - Dood van een vrijgezel - Businessman
- De blauwe zaden - Von Sommeren
- Prometheus XIII - Professor Curtis
- Moordbrigade Stockholm - Martin Beck
- Miserere - Edmond
