= Anton Quintana =

Dutch writer (1937–2017)

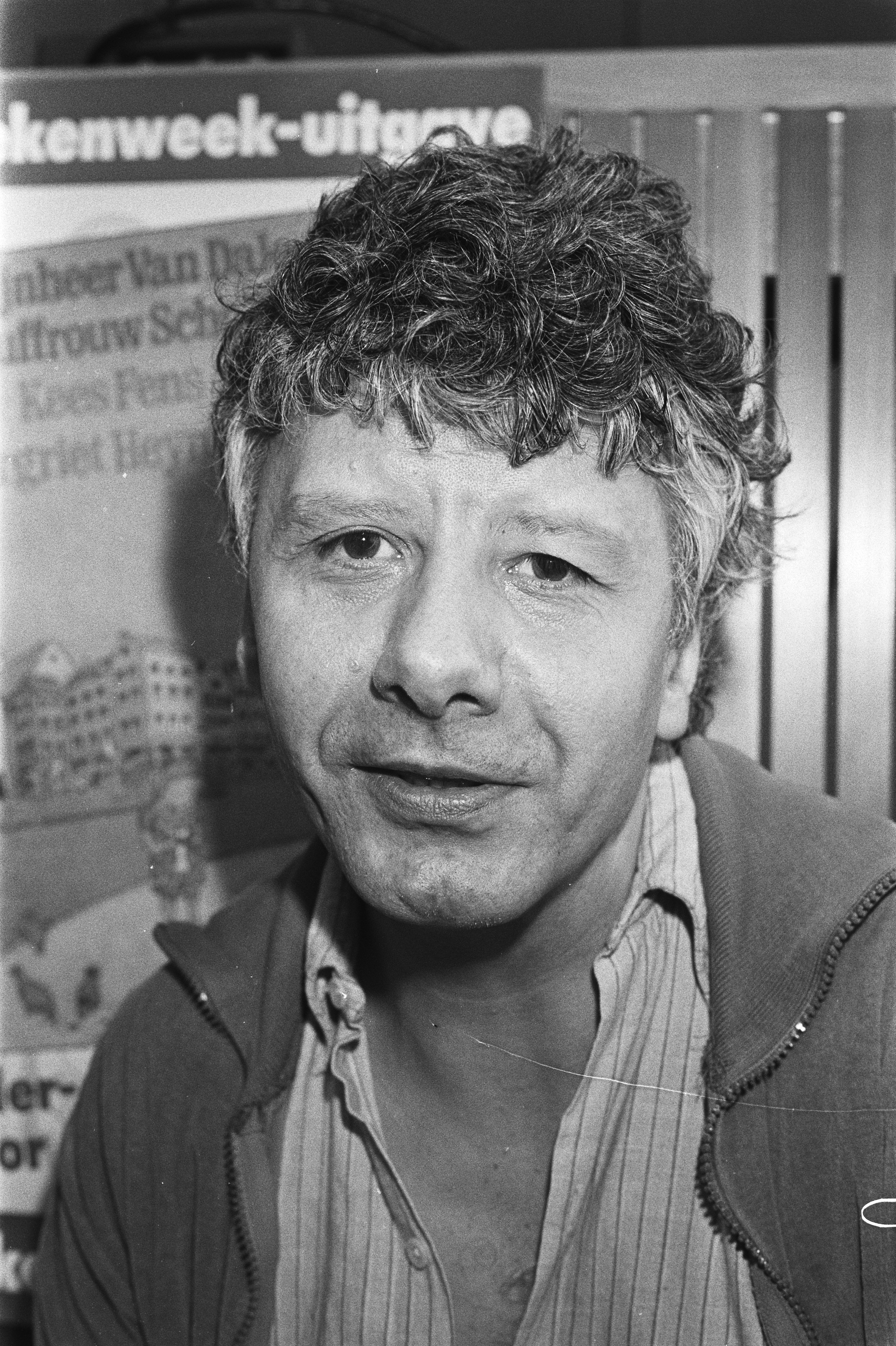
- Anton Quintana in 1983
- Born: Anton Adolf Kuyten; 6 September 1937; Amsterdam
- Died: 15 October 2017 (aged 80); Hoorn
- Occupation: Writer
- Writing career
- Notable awards: Gouden Griffel 1983; Gouden Uil 1996; Woutertje Pieterse Prijs 1996

Anton Quintana (6 September 1937 – 15 October 2017), pseudonym of Anton Adolf Kuyten, was a Dutch writer.

== Biography ==
=== Early life ===
Quintana was born in 1937 as the twin brother of André Kuyten. His brother was named by his mother and Quintana was named by his father after Anton Mussert and Adolf Hitler. His father abandoned his wife and children when Quintana was two years old to join the Dutch national socialist party. Their mother died of tuberculosis when they were ten years old. The twins then moved to an orphanage in Amsterdam.

Due to complications at birth, one side of Quintana's face was left disfigured, which was only corrected when he was sixteen years of age. Differences with his brother, both in physical appearance and in popularity, and being abandoned by his father would translate into recurring themes in his work, such as rivalry and a search for identity. His brother André also went on to write books, poetry and radio plays and asked Quintana not to use his name "Anton Kuyten" as it was too similar to "André Kuyten", so Quintana decided to write under his mother's surname. Quintana was also asked not to write poems and adult literature like André; instead Quintana would focus on other work, such as crime novels and children's literature. Quintana would later state that he does consider his work literature but that he ended up in children's literature as a result of this deal with his brother.

=== Radio and television ===
His first radio play was Ontmoeting in de herfst which aired in 1962 and published a year later in 6 hoorspelen (1963). In 1970 he received the ANV-Visser Neerlandiaprijs for his radio play De vrouw onder het schavot and in 1973 he received the same award for his television play Het zout der aarde. His brother André received the same award a few years earlier in 1967 and again in 1973. In 1970, Quintana also adapted the book Het wassende water (1925) by Herman de Man into a radio play. Peter van Gestel was involved as dramaturge for this adaption.

In 1975 and 1976 he adapted the stories of Martin Beck, written by Maj Sjöwall and Per Wahlöö, into a radio play called Moordbrigade Stockholm. The main characters were played by Jan Borkus, Hans Karsenbarg, Paul van der Lek and Hans Hoekman.

In 1977 and 1978 Quintana wrote the popular television series De Kris Pusaka.

=== Writing ===
Quintana made his debut in children's literature with the book Padjelanta in 1973. The book was not a commercial success, and Quintana bought all remaining copies and used them to raise his garden. His next children's book De adelaar was published in 1974. Quintana also wrote comic stories for children's magazine Pep with illustrations by Hans G. Kresse, Jos Looman and Thé Tjong-Khing.

In the years after his brother's death in 1979, Quintana turned to vodka, and he travelled to Sumatra to escape his life in the Netherlands. In 1982, he published the book De bavianenkoning which is based on his travels in Sumatra. Quintana's emotional struggles left him unable to read or write, and instead he had to dictate the book to someone else. Quintana was awarded the Gouden Griffel in 1983 for the book.

In 1995, he published the book Het boek van Bod Pa for which he was awarded the Gouden Uil and Woutertje Pieterse Prijs in 1996. In 2001, his last book De hemelruiter (2000), a sequel to Het boek van Bod Pa, received an honorable mention by the jury of the Woutertje Pieterse Prijs.

Quintana's work has been translated into several languages, including by Mirjam Pressler (German) and John Nieuwenhuizen (English). Quintana himself has also translated several stories and books into Dutch, including work of Harlan Ellison, Alec Haig and John D. MacDonald.

=== Death ===
Quintana died on 15 October 2017.

== Awards ==
Quintana received various awards for his work:

- 1970: ANV-Visser Neerlandiaprijs, De vrouw onder het schavot
- 1973: ANV-Visser Neerlandiaprijs, Het zout der aarde
- 1983: Gouden Griffel, De bavianenkoning
- 1996: Gouden Uil, Het boek van Bod Pa
- 1996: Woutertje Pieterse Prijs, Het boek van Bod Pa
