= Hoagland =

Hoagland is an American surname derived from the Swedish Högland or Dutch "Hoaglandt". Prior to the 20th century, most Hoagland families lived in the state of New Jersey

- Abraham Hoagland (1797–1872), early Mormon leader
- Al Hoagland (1926–2022), American computer engineer
- Alice Hoagland (1949–2020), American flight attendant and activist
- Dennis Robert Hoagland (1884–1949), American plant physiologist and soil chemist
- Edward Hoagland (born 1932), American nature and travel writer
- Ellsworth Hoagland (1903–1972), American film editor
- Jessamine Hoagland (1879–1957), American businesswoman
- Jim Hoagland (1940–2024), American Pulitzer Prize-winning journalist
- John Hoagland (1947–1984), American photographer
- Joseph C. Hoagland (1841–1899), American founder of the Royal Baking Powder Company
- Mahlon Hoagland (1921–2009), American biochemist
- Moses Hoagland (1812–1865), United States Representative from Ohio
- Peter Hoagland (1941–2007), United States Representative from Nebraska
- Richard C. Hoagland (born 1945), American conspiracy theorist
- Richard E. Hoagland (born 1950), United States diplomat
- Robert Hoagland (1963–2022), a Connecticut man missing from 2013 until his death in 2022.
- Sarah Hoagland (born 1945), American philosophy professor
- Tony Hoagland (born 1953), American poet and writer
- Willard Hoagland (1862–1936), American baseball player, manager and umpire
- Samuel A. Hoagland (born 1953), American Judge and Professor of Pharmaceutical Law
- Doug Hoagland (born 1952), American journalist

As a given name

- Hoagy Carmichael (Hoagland Carmichael), composer and songwriter

Hoagland may refer to a place:

- Hoagland, Indiana, community in the United States
- Hoagland, Nebraska, unincorporated community
- Hoagland, Ohio, unincorporated community
- Hoagland-Pincus Conference Center, facility of the University of Massachusetts Medical School

Hoagland, other uses:

- Hoagland solution, also known as Hoagland's solution, universal plant nutrient solution originally developed in 1919 by Dennis Robert Hoagland at the University of California, Berkeley

== See also ==
Hoogland
