= Rosa Spier Huis =

Dutch retirement home

The Rosa Spier Huis is a retirement home founded in 1963 in Laren, Netherlands, where many notable Dutch artists lived out their final years. The original idea, by harpist Rosa Spier, was to create a community where artists could spend their last years while continuing to contribute artistically. The home has 73 apartments, some with studios. There are communal spaces as well, including a library and a theater. Mien Ruys designed the garden.

In 2010, the home's director announced that rather than build new accommodations on the same location (on the Esseboom), the home would move to the Hector Treublaan, still within the town of Laren.

Notable retirees include Maurits Cornelis Escher, Marianna Franken, Marten Toonder and Emmy Lopes Dias, John Kraaijkamp Sr. ,Hetty Beck and Elly Salomé.
