= Emmy Lopes Dias =

Dutch actress and activist

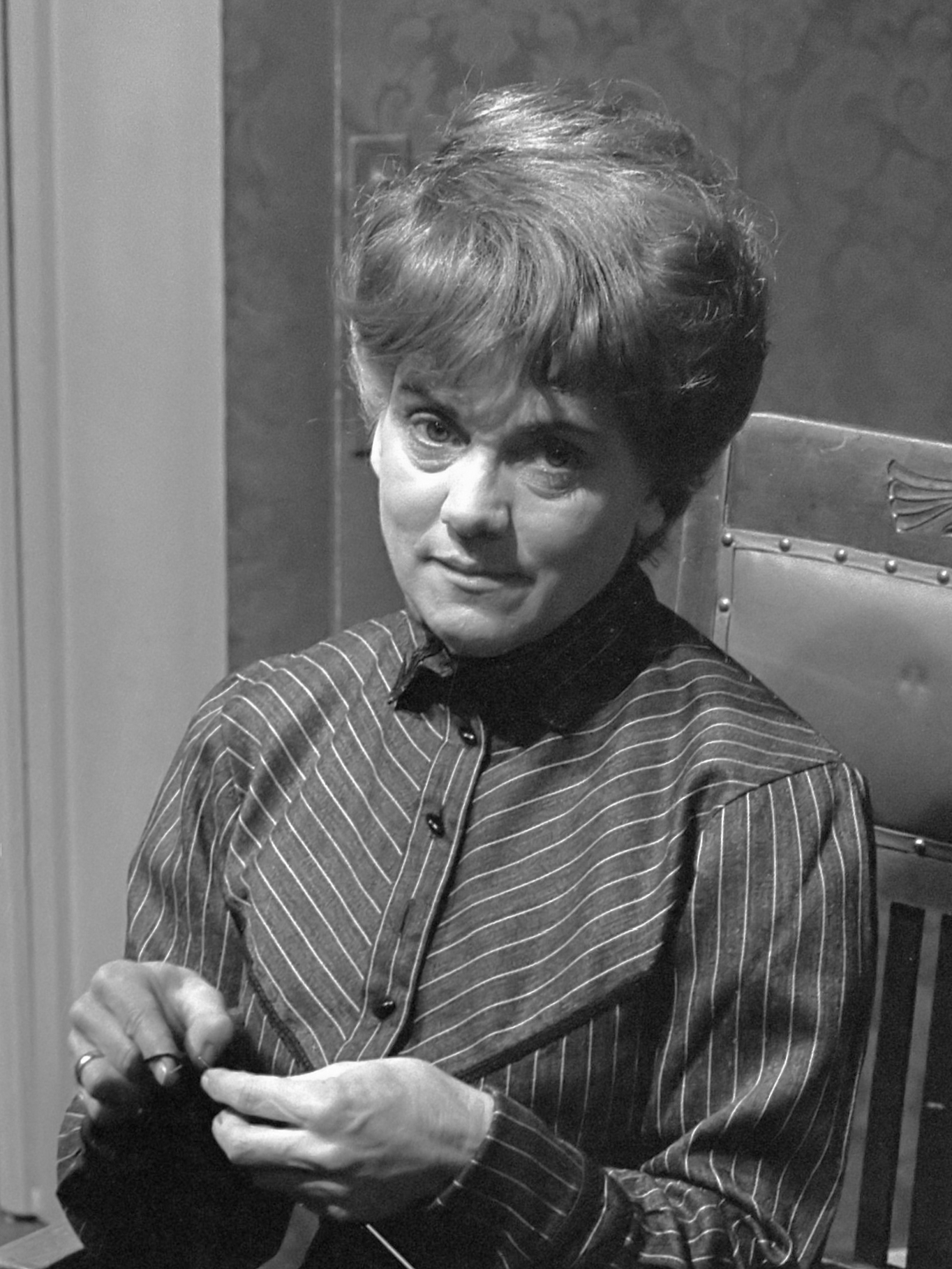
- Emmy Lopes Dias in 1970
- Born: Emmy Davine Lopes Dias; 4 August 1919; Hilversum, Netherlands
- Died: 28 March 2005 (aged 85); Laren, Netherlands

Emmy Lopes Dias (4 August 1919, in Hilversum – 28 March 2005, in Laren) was a Dutch actress and activist who performed on stage, radio, and television. She was a well-known advocate for the right to die.

== Biography ==
Lopes Dias was born to a city councilmember for the Social Democratic Workers' Party (later renamed PvdA). She began her acting career shortly after World War II. She graduated cum laude from the Amsterdamse Toneelschool in 1949 and joined the Comedia, the predecessor of the Nederlandse Comedie. She was praised for her speech and began working in radio, performing in hundreds of radio plays and other radio shows. On television, she played in De Kleine Waarheid (as Maartje), in Q & Q, and in Swiebertje. She continued her work on the stage until the 1970s. She joined Nieuw Links, the "New Left" movement in the PvdA, in 1966, and later joined the party's board. She died in Laren, in the Rosa Spier Huis.
