= Hoogland (surname) =

Hoogland (Dutch pronunciation: [ˈɦoːxlɑnt]) is a Dutch toponymic surname meaning "high land". It could have referred to the town Hoogland in Utrecht province or to any elevated land. People with this surname include:

- Cornelia Hoogland (born 1952), Canadian poet
- Duco Hoogland (born 1984), Dutch politician
- Herman Hoogland (1891–1955), Dutch drafts player
- Jeffrey Hoogland (born 1993), Dutch track cyclist
- Monique Hoogland (born 1967), Dutch badminton player
- Ruurd Dirk Hoogland (1922–1994), Dutch explorer and botanist
- Tim Hoogland (born 1985), German footballer
- William Hoogland (ca.1794–1832), American engraver

== See also ==
- Hoagland
- Zeke Hogeland
