= Harry Bannink =

Dutch composer, arranger and pianist

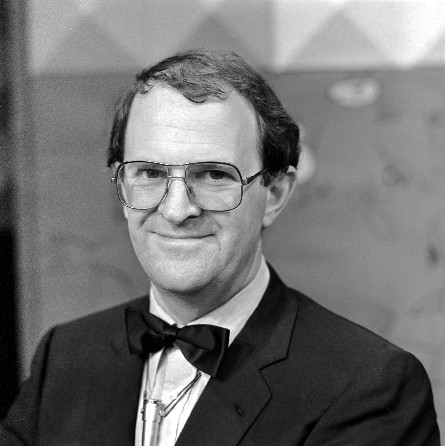
Harry Bannink in 1978

Harry Bannink (10 April 1929, Enschede – 19 October 1999, Bosch en Duin) was a Dutch composer, arranger and pianist. He wrote over 3,000 songs.

Bannink studied at the Royal Conservatory in The Hague, receiving his degree in 1946. He started his musical career in the late fifties, when he joined a small dance-orchestra as pianist. His compositions for the play "Het staat u vrij" (Delftsch Studenten Corps, 1958) were his first works for the theatre. Later he would write music for many songs by Wim Sonneveld, Wieteke Van Dort and especially Annie M.G. Schmidt. . He wrote music for many Dutch TV-shows, including Ja zuster, nee zuster, 't Schaep met de 5 poten, Sesamstraat, and De Stratemakeropzeeshow. Since 1973 he worked with Edwin Rutten on the weekly children's TV show De film van ome Willem (in which he appeared as head of the music-ensemble on every episode) and writer Willem Wilmink, with whom he wrote a lot of songs for the Dutch children's education programme Het Klokhuis.

Together with Annie M.G. Schmidt he wrote several Dutch musicals. Later, he would also write the music for the funeral of Schmidt. Among his last musical activities were a CD - on which he sang some of his own compositions - and a book with piano-arrangements of all the songs from the series Ja zuster, nee zuster. He died, aged 70, of cardiac arrest and was buried at the Nieuwe Algemene Begraafplaats, Woudenbergseweg in Zeist.

In 2000, a documentary about Harry Bannink and his work was released on Dutch television. In his birthplace Enschede, a theatre was named after him, as was a street in Amsterdam and Utrecht.
