= De Kris Pusaka =

Dutch television series

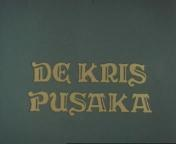
Title card

De Kris Pusaka is a Dutch television series broadcast by the Katholieke Radio Omroep. The series was written by Anton Quintana and directed by Bram van Erkel, with cinematography by Fred Tammes. It was a popular success. Its thirteen 25-minute episodes were broadcast from 31 October 1977 until 30 January 1978.

The story follows Ben van Rooyen, a researcher who works at the Royal Tropical Institute, a research center in Amsterdam focusing on tropical cultures and especially those of the Dutch East Indies, the former Dutch colony. He purchases a kris, an asymmetrical dagger from Indonesia that often carries symbolic meanings, at auction, which an Indonesian antique dealer tries to procure from him. His curiosity piqued and the sword stolen, he ends up traveling to Indonesia with his younger brother Mark, where he discovers that the kris is in fact pusaka, that is, an heirloom endowed with special powers because of its age; it requires "special reverence and even fear". The series ends on a cliffhanger.

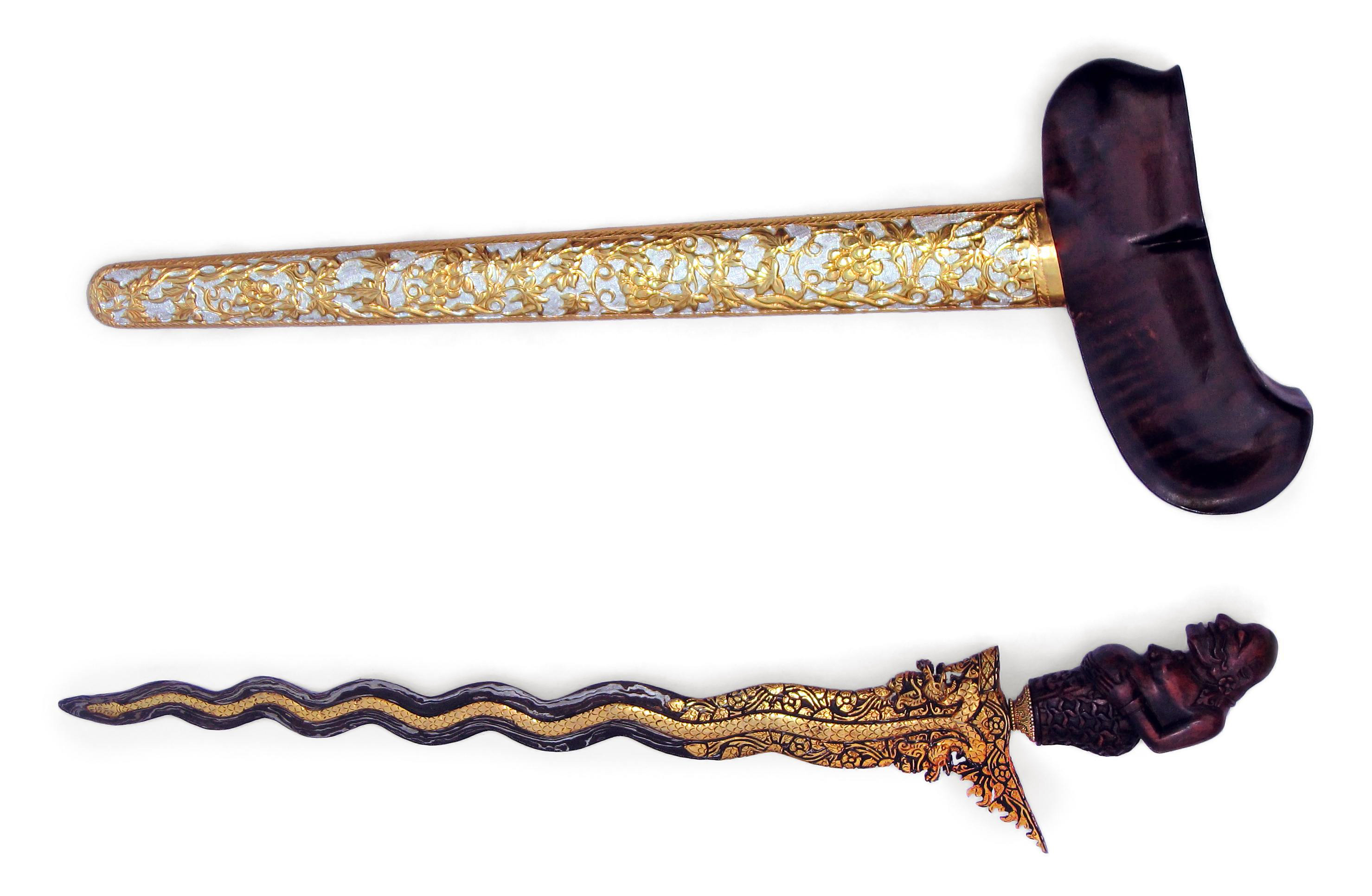
An example of a kris; the blade is on the bottom.

Krisses have long had mystical powers attributed to them in Indonesian and Malay mythology. These powers, such as the ability to go about without its owner or to kill enemies by being pointed in their direction, could be either good or bad; the weapons could also have elemental powers and have different affinities with different people. Beliefs in the sacred power of krisses remain common in Indonesia, and they are often used in Javanese ceremonies.

The series was released on DVD by Just Entertainment on 12 June 2007. The release included all episodes of the series, but no special features. Ludo Keeris, reviewing for the DVD review website allesoverfilm.nl, found the story to be spectacular but complained of the sound and image quality, writing that the series was showing its age as it had not been remastered. Guido Franken, writing for the Dutch film website Neerlands Filmdoek, found the story and video quality acceptable, but considered the audio to be too muted and the camera angles too static.

== Cast ==
- Willem Nijholt as Ben van Rooyen
- Erik van 't Wout as Mark van Rooyen
- Dore Smit as Anne
- Peter Aryans as Santos
- Ben Aerden as Professor Smit
- Bob Goedhart as director of the Tropeninstituut

== Episodes ==
1. "Eenmaal ... andermaal" ("Going Once ... Going Twice")
2. "Ongezonde belangstelling" ("Unhealthy Interest")
3. "De man met het masker" ("The Man with the Mask")
4. "Een waardeloze film" ("A Terrible Film")
5. "Een schuit vol Chinezen" ("A Boatload of Chinese")
6. "Kris te koop" ("Kris for Sale")
7. "Negen of elf" ("Nine or Eleven")
8. "Terug naar het vuur" ("Back to the Fire")
9. "De ene broer is de andere niet" ("One Brother is Not the Other")
10. "Schimmen in de nacht" ("Spirits in the Night")
11. "De man met de verrekijker" ("The Man with the Binoculars")
12. "Tijger als tegenstander" ("Tiger, the Enemy")
13. "De beslissing" ("The Decision")
