= Karel Eykman =

Dutch writer of children's literature (1936–2022)

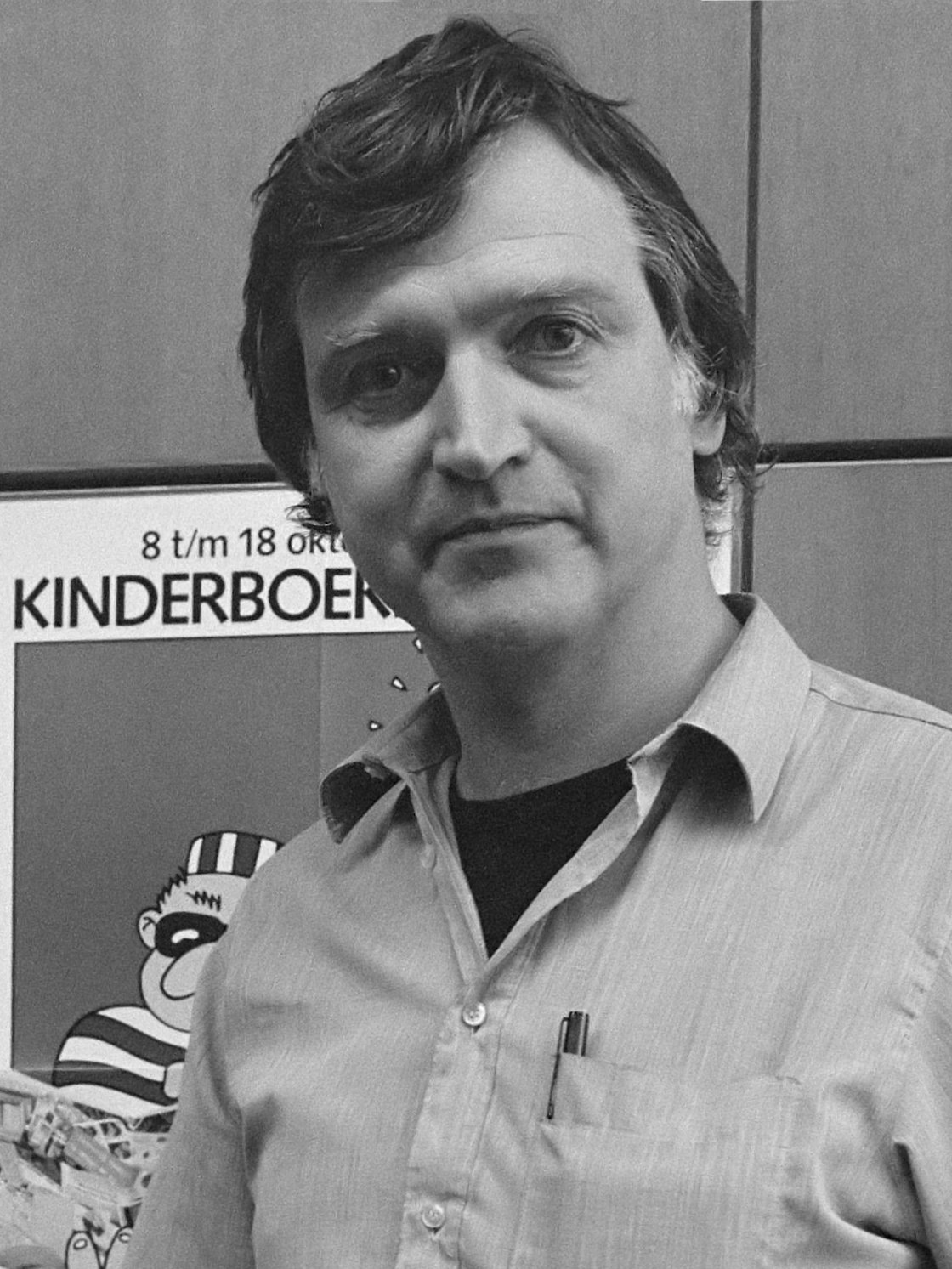
- Eykman in 1986
- Born: 1 March 1936; Rotterdam, Netherlands
- Died: 30 August 2022 (aged 86); Amsterdam, Netherlands
- Occupation: Writer
- Language: Dutch
- Notable awards: Gouden Griffel 1984

Karel Eykman (1 March 1936 – 30 August 2022) was a Dutch writer of children's literature.

== Early life ==
Eykman started studying theology in 1956.

== Career ==
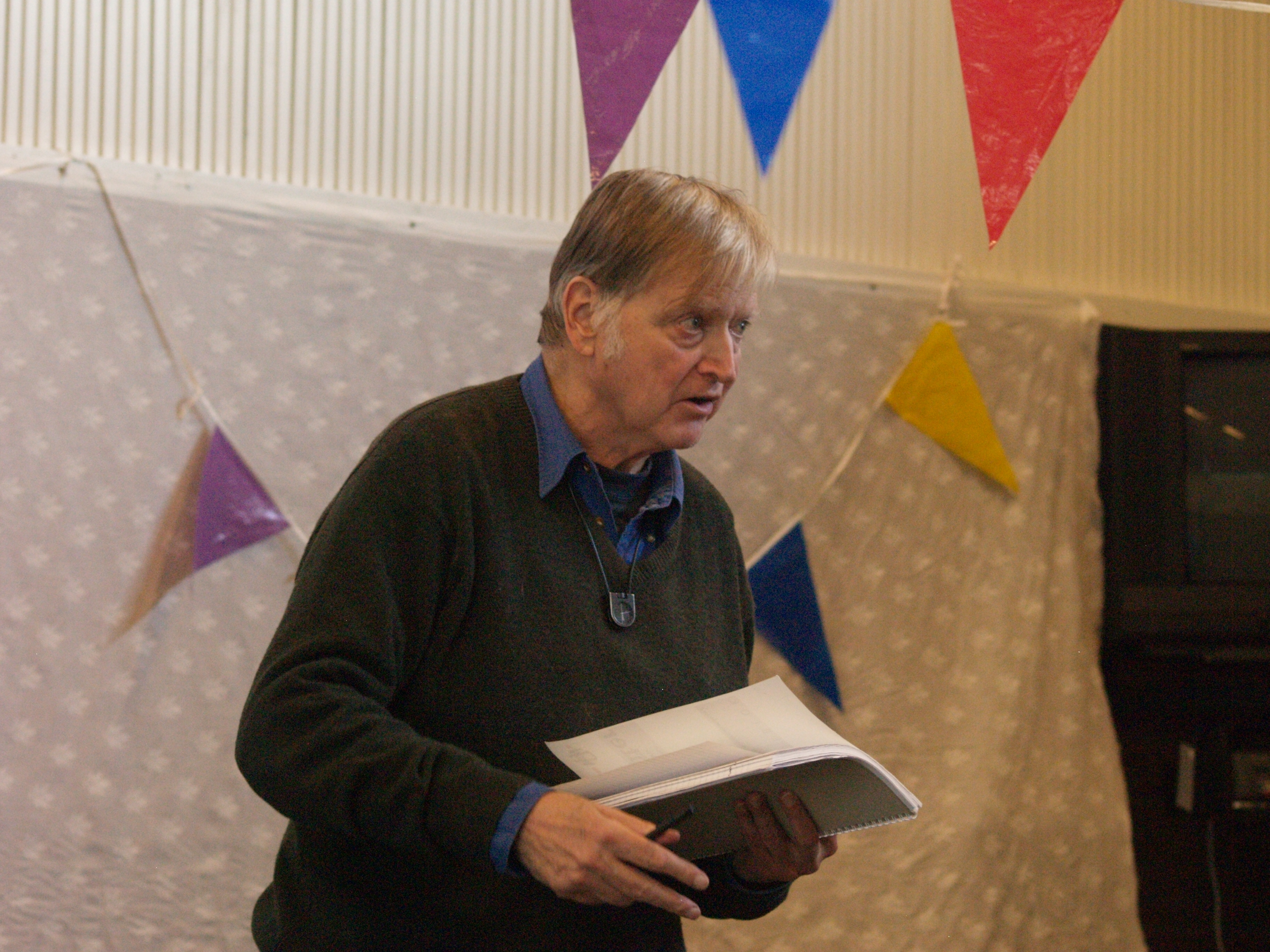
Eykman in 2008

In 1969, Eykman published his first book De werksters van half vijf en andere gelijkenissen.

He won the Zilveren Griffel award in 1975 for his book De vreselijk verlegen vogelverschrikker. In 1984, he won the Gouden Griffel award for his book Liefdesverdriet. In the 1970s he was also a member of Het Schrijverscollectief, a group of writers which included Eykman, Willem Wilmink, Hans Dorrestijn, Ries Moonen, Jan Riem and Fetze Pijlman. Together they contributed to television shows such as De Stratemakeropzeeshow and De film van Ome Willem.

In 1986, he published the book De zaak Jan Steen which was the Kinderboekenweekgeschenk during the Boekenweek that year. Many of his books were published by Uitgeverij De Harmonie.

Eykman died in Amsterdam on 30 August 2022, at the age of 86. The Karel Eykman school in Amstelveen is named after him.

== Awards ==
- 1975: Zilveren Griffel, De vreselijk verlegen vogelverschrikker
- 1984: Gouden Griffel, Liefdesverdriet
