= De Bereboot =

Dutch children's television series

De Bereboot (The Bear Boat) is a Dutch children's puppet television programme in the 1970s written by Lo Hartog van Banda. 407 episodes were made for broadcast on NOS (October 2, 1976 - April 29, 1977) and AVRO (October 1, 1977 - September 30, 1978).

== Cast ==
=== Leading characters ===
- Kapitein Brom (Captain Grouch); a brown tough bear with white whiskers.
- Maatje (Buddy), a young panda who has a solution for every problem.
- Brilbeer (Spectacle Bear), a yellow touchy bear with grey sideburns and a white boilersuit. His catchphrase, "technisch gesproken" translates as "technically speaking".

=== Supporting characters ===
- Neel; landlady of resident pub Het Zeemanshuis (The Sailor's Home). She's a cow in the literary sense; she fancies the captain and loves to give him cuddle names.
- Kokki; the pub's Italian chef. Everytime something goes wrong he says "Santa Hoopla".
- Jimmy Bril (Jimmy Specs); a pop singer.
- Professor Knobbel (Dr. Knob); a mad genius whose gadgets don't work properly.
- Fred de Kei (Fred Rock); a business-pig who wastes no chance to make money. He wears a black top hat and always has a cigar in his mouth.
- Teun; a farmer whose chicken eggs are transported by the bears.
- Guus Hap (Gus Bite); an ostrich who eats anything within eyesight to return it as a real surprise-egg.
- Alida; a seasnake who insists on being addressed as a lady. The captain always regards her wish.
- Lorrelies; a mermaid who gets easily insulted by Brilbeer's refusal to eat her seafood.
- Juf (Miss); a strict school-teacher. She moved to Stupid Toddlers Island (Dutch: Domme-dreumessen-eiland) which was in serious need of education.

=== Plot ===
The three bears enter the pub and start a conversation with Neel; halfway subject switches to one of their adventures which often took place on the silliest of theme-isles such as Stupid Toddlers Island, Cake Island (Dutch: Taart-eiland) or Hat Island (Dutch: Hoed-eiland) . These adventures were serialised over the course of two to five episodes to fit the five-minute time-slot.

== Side-project ==
During their AVRO days the bears also hosted the Wednesday afternoon show Berebios (Bear's Flicks) at the local cinema where Fred sold the tickets. Apart from their own adventures they also aired Dutch-dubbed cartoons (from Hanna-Barbera, The Adventures of Tintin, and their Scandinavian peer Rasmus Klump). After De Bereboot was cancelled, the Wednesday slot changed its name into Kinderbios (Kid's Flicks) and remained for about a decade.

=== Merchandise and popularity resurgence ===
The images of Brom, Maatje and Brilbeer appeared on merchandise ranging from erasers to balloons; the latter even guesting in one of the episodes. A six -track sampler-EP was sold at a chainstore-supermarket in preparation of the full-length albums.

In 1991, nine year after re-runs of the first season, De Bereboot was introduced to the new generation; this time on TROS. The original theme-tune was replaced with the one used for the AVRO-season and the episodes were slotted together as one. Later children's channel Kindernet (now Nickelodeon) took over with more success; by 2000 new merchandise was available including double VHS-tapes.

It was also adapted into a comic strip by Ton Beek for the magazine Bobo.
