= Hallo Bandoeng =

Single by Willy Derby
- A-side: "Hallo Bandoeng"
- Released: 1929
- Genre: Levenslied
- Songwriter: Willy Derby

Audio sample
- file; help

"Hallo Bandoeng" is a song by the Dutch levenslied singer Willy Derby (real name: Willem Frederik Christiaan Dieben, 1886-1944). It was released in 1929 and sold more than 50,000 copies, an astronomical number for that time. It was one of Derby's songs that became part of Dutch culture. The phrase "Hallo Bandoeng" was well known at that time, as the usual opening used by Radio Kootwijk when establishing a connection with Bandung (in Dutch: "Bandoeng"), one of the most important cities in the then Dutch East Indies.

== Narrative ==
The song tells the story of an old woman, who spends the last of her money at Radio Kootwijk so that, for the first time in years, she can hear the voice of her son, who lives in Bandoeng with his "little brown wife" and their children. In the refrain, the son greets his mother and, with a sob, she greets her dearest boy. The son asks how she's doing ("How are you, old woman"), but her answer is only that she misses him so much.

When the woman asks about his wife, her son tells her that they talk about her every day and that the children pray for the grandmother they've never met each evening and kiss her portrait before going to sleep. In only four more years, he would return to the Netherlands and hug her. He then tells her that his youngest son is with him and the boy greets her: "Dear grandmother, tabe, tabe" (a greeting in Indonesian, now chiefly regional). Upon hearing this, the woman thanks God for allowing her to have heard her grandson's voice and collapses crying.

The last version of the refrain is modified. The son calls his mother again, but only hears a sob. The last sentence has the woman dead and the child calling "tabe".

=== Original lyrics ===
't Kleine moedertje stond bevend

Op het telegraafkantoor
Vriendelijk sprak de ambtenaar: "Juffrouw
Aanstonds geeft Bandoeng gehoor"
Trillend op haar stramme benen
Greep zij naar de microfoon
En toen hoorde zij, o wonder
Zacht de stem van haren zoon

Refrain:
Hallo, Bandoeng
"Ja moeder, hier ben ik"
"Dag lieve jongen," zegt zij, met een snik
Hallo, hallo "Hoe gaat het ouwe vrouw"
Dan zegt ze alleen "Ik verlang zo erg naar jou"

"Lieve jongen," zegt ze teder
"Ik heb maanden lang gespaard
't Was me, om jou te kunnen spreken
M'n allerlaatste gulden waard"
En ontroerd zegt hij dan: "Moeder
Nog vier jaar, dan is het om
Oudjelief, wat zal 'k je pakken
Als ik weer in Holland kom"

(Refrain)

"Jongenlief," vraagt ze, "hoe gaat het
Met je kleine, bruine vrouw"
"Best hoor," zegt hij, en wij spreken
Elke dag hier over jou
En m'n kleuters zeggen 's avonds
Voor 't gaan slapen 'n schietgebed
Voor hun onbekende opoe
Met 'n kus op jouw portret

(Refrain)

"Wacht eens, moeder," zegt hij lachend
"'k Bracht mijn jongste zoontje mee"
Even later hoort ze duidelijk
"Opoelief, tabe, tabe"
Maar dan wordt het haar te machtig
Zachtjes fluistert ze: "O Heer
Dank, dat 'k dat heb mogen horen"
En dan valt ze wenend neer

Hallo! Bandoeng
"Ja moeder, hier ben ik"
Zij antwoordt niet, hij hoort alleen 'n snik
"Hallo, hallo" klinkt over verre zee
Zij is niet meer

En het kindje roept: "tabe"...
