= Joost Prinsen =

Dutch actor and television presenter (1942–2025)

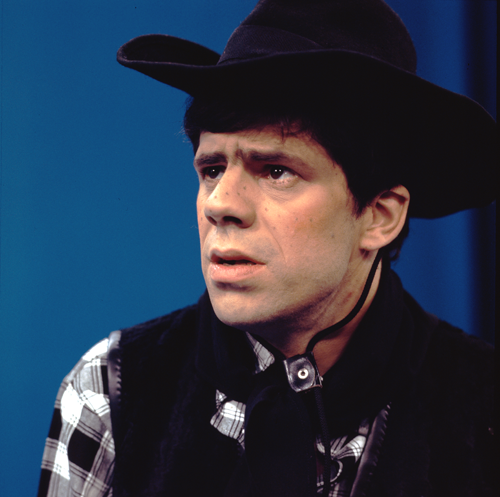
- Prinsen on De stratemakeropzeeshow in 1973
- Born: Joseph Jules Thomas Prinsen; 9 June 1942; Vught, German-occupied Netherlands
- Died: 3 November 2025 (aged 83); Amsterdam, The Netherlands
- Occupations: Actor; singer; writer; television presenter
- Years active: 1969–2023
- Known for: De stratemakeropzeeshow De Zevensprong; Het Klokhuis; Met het mes op tafel

Joseph Jules Thomas Prinsen (9 June 1942 – 3 November 2025) was a Dutch actor, television presenter, singer and writer. He performed in the popular Dutch television programmes De stratemakeropzeeshow, Het Klokhuis, and De Zevensprong, and he also presented the quiz show Met het mes op tafel. He was decorated as an Officer of the Order of Orange-Nassau in 2004.

== Life and career ==
Prinsen was born in Vught on 9 June 1942. His father, Claudius Prinsen (1896–1952), was mayor of Breda and Roosendaal. After graduating from the Toneelschool Amsterdam, Prinsen debuted as a stage actor in 1969 in the play De kleine parade, directed by Wim Sonneveld.

In the early 1970s, Aart Staartjes created the children's television programme De stratemakeropzeeshow with lead roles for Wieteke van Dort, Prinsen and himself. It was a popular and occasionally controversial programme that introduced children to various topics. Prinsen became well known in the Netherlands for playing a character called Erik Engerd in this show. De stratemakeropzeeshow was followed in 1979 by J.J. De Bom voorheen De Kindervriend, in which Van Dort, Staartjes and Prinsen also played the lead roles. Prinsen played the role of Jan J. de Bom, the owner of a toy shop.

In 1982, he played a role in the television series De Zevensprong, based on the book by Tonke Dragt. Prinsen played various roles in the educational children's programme Het Klokhuis since the early 1990s. He was the presenter of the quiz show Met het mes op tafel from 1997 until 2015.

He wrote columns for local newspapers, and he also wrote pieces for magazines about cycling and bridge. In March 2007, he published De scharrelaar, a collection of diary excerpts and columns he wrote. A year later, he published a book about bridge, titled Een goede speler is niet eerlijk.

Prinsen was married to Emma Wildeman who died in 2020. They were together for 50 years and Prinsen wrote a book "Na Emma" (After Emma) about the year after her death. After the death of Emma, Prinsen was in a relationship with former news presenter Noraly Beyer until his death. In 2023, they both appeared as couple in an episode of the television series Nood.

Prinsen died on 3 November 2025 at the age of 83 from cancer and complications of a stroke.

== Bibliography ==
- De scharrelaar (2007)
- Een goede speler is niet eerlijk (2008)
- Mijn vrouw pikt zeepjes (2020)
- Na Emma (2021)
