= Hans Dorrestijn =

Dutch writer and comedian

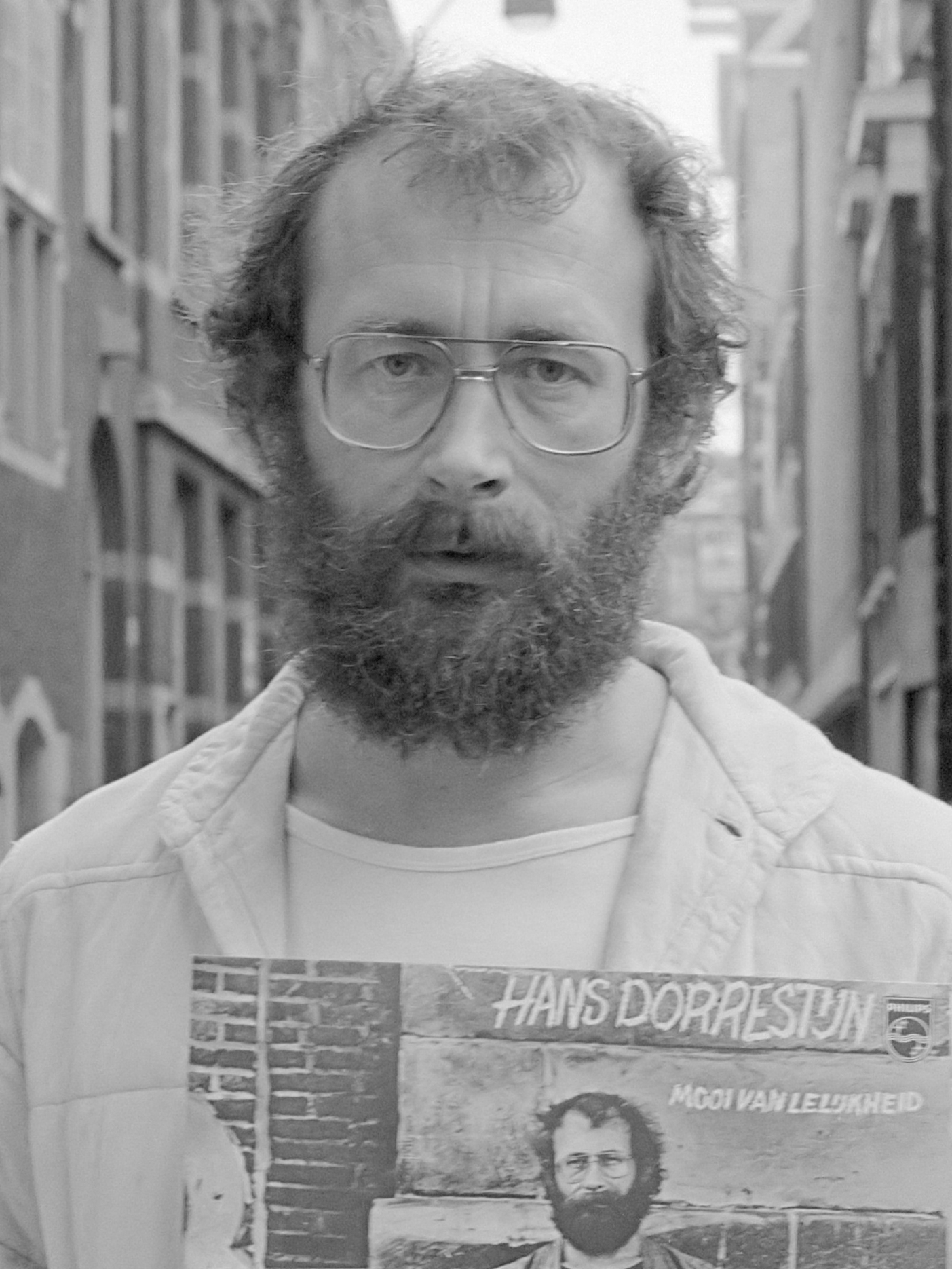
- Dorrestijn in 1979
- Born: Hans Dorrestijn; 16 June 1940 (age 86); Ede, The Netherlands

Comedy career
- Years active: 1973–present
- Medium: Stand-up, television, author
- Genre: Black comedy
- Website: hansdorrestijn.nl

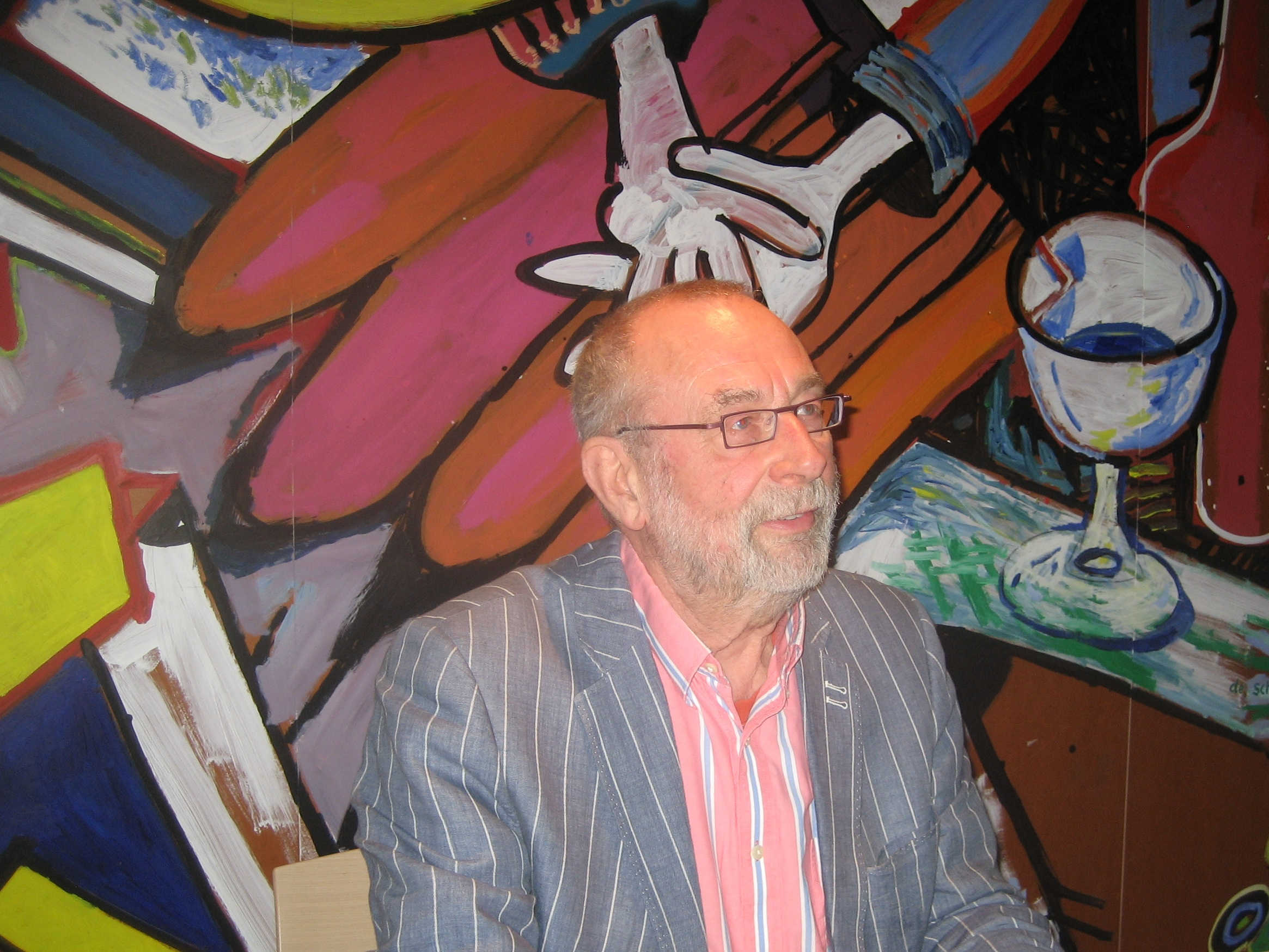
Hans Dorrestijn (2016)

Hans Dorrestijn (born 16 June 1940 in Ede, Gelderland) is a Dutch comedian and writer.

== Programs ==
- Bofkont (1973)
- Mooi van lelijkheid (1977)
- In staat van ontbinding (1980)
- Dorrestijns geweten spreekt (1982)
- Circus Horlepiep (1985, with Lévi Weemoedt)
- Liederen van wanhoop en ongeloof (1987)
- Liederen van wanhoop en ongeloof II (1989)
- Pretpark (1991)
- Na regen komt Dorrestijn (1993)
- Gesmolten ijsberen (1995)
- Dorrestijn viert oud en nieuw (1996)
- Onvervuld verlangen – Dorrestijn viert oud en nieuw (1998)
- Cirkels (2000, with Martin van Dijk)
- Het naakte bestaan (2005, with Martin van Dijk)
- Ruïnes (2006, with Martin van Dijk)
- Buigen (2010)
- Goeie genade (2013–2015)
- Baardmannetjes (2014, with Nico de Haan)
- Eindelijk Licht (2014, with Zazí)
- Het einde is zoek (2015–2016)

== Filmography ==
- J.J. de Bom voorheen: 'De kindervriend' (1979) (writer)
- Sesamstraat (1976) (writer)
- De Stratemakeropzeeshow (1972) (writer)
- De Vliegende Hollander (1995) (dialogue advisor) (song advisor)
