= List of publications during the Boekenweek =

This is a list of publications on the occasion of the Boekenweek, an annual event held in the Netherlands dedicated to Dutch literature. Each year a well-known writer, usually Dutch or Flemish, is asked to write a book, usually a novella, called the Boekenweekgeschenk (book week gift), which is to be given away during the festival. The Boekenweekgeschenk is usually a novel or a collection of short stories; the Kinderboekenweekgeschenk is a children's book. For children too young to read, a picture book, the Prentenboek van de Kinderboekenweek, is published.

== Boekenweekgeschenk ==
Year	Title	Author
1932	Geschenk - Bijdragen van Nederlandsche schrijvers en schrijfsters, bijeengebracht ter gelegenheid van de Nederlandsche Boekenweek 7 - 14 mei 1932	A.M.E. van Dishoeck; C. Veth; C. J. Kelk
1933	Geschenk 1933 - Herinneringen aan Nederlandsche Schrijvers, bijeengebracht ter gelegenheid van de Nederlandsche Boekenweek 29 april - 6 mei 1933	C. J. Kelk
1934	Geschenk 1934 - inhoudende 12 portretten van Nederlandsche auteurs	C. J. Kelk
1935	Rondom het Boek 1935	Roel Houwink
1936	Rondom het Boek 1936	Roel Houwink
1937	Rondom het Boek 1937	Mr. E. Elias
1938	Drie novellen - Een bundel novellen 1938	F. Bordewijk: Huis te Huur; Marie Koenen: Het Friesche goud - Anno 1656; Marianne Philips: De Koningsweg
1939	Drie novellen	Antoon Coolen: Huwelijk; Augusta de Wit: Liefde en geweld langs den Barito; Johan van der Woude: Afgesloten balans
1940	Drie novellen	Egbert Eewijck: De Getuige; Jan Campert: Deez' kleine Hand; M. Vasalis: Onweer
1946	Het kleine geschenk	Commissie voor de Propaganda van het Nederlandsche Boek
1947	De Ontmoeting	Antoon Coolen
1948	Oeroeg	Hella S. Haasse
1949	Twee negerpopjes	Clare Lennart
1950	De zaak Beukenoot	Marianne Philips
1951	De porselein tafel	Olaf J. de Landell
1952	Insecten in plastic	Manuel van Loggem
1953	Tien verhalen	J.W. Schotman: De onverzadelijke Mandarijn; Annie Salomons: Trouw moet blijken R. Blijstra: Een post van vertrouwen Albert Helman: Het binnenste der aarde Henriëtte van Eyk: Voor de feestdagen koopt nu uw kersteend... B. Stroman: Twijfel omtrent Hannibal Boontjes; Theun de Vries: De auto's Maurice Gilliams: Meneer Albéric; Johan Daisne: De dood op de motorfiets Nescio: Pleziertrein
1954	Goed geboekt	Jacques den Haan; Adriaan Morriën; Charles Boost
1955	Op schrijversvoeten door Nederland	Clare Lennart
1956	Ontmoetingen met schrijvers	Dr. P.H. Ritter jr.
1957	De nacht der Girondijnen	Prof. dr. J. Presser
1958	Het gehucht	A. Defresne
1959	Dat weet ik zelf niet	Hella S. Haasse
1960	De zalenman	Elisabeth de Jong-Keesing
1961	De onbekende uren	Agaath van Ree
1962	Een schot in de lucht	Anton Koolhaas
1963	Europa in een boek	Prof. dr. J. Presser
1964	Vier vingers	Robert van Gulik
1965	De Geuzen	Harry Paape
1966	Het zwaard, de zee en het valse hart	Theun de Vries
1967	Herinneringen van een bramzijgertje	Jan de Hartog
1968	Kom eens om een keizer	Max Dendermonde
1969	De goden moeten hun getal hebben	Hubert Lampo
1970	Kasteel in Ierland	Jan Gerhard Toonder
1971	Protest per prent	D.H. Couvée
1972	Poesie	Peter van Lindonk
1973	Een lampion voor een blinde	Bertus Aafjes
1974	Als ik, bij voorbeeld, de geest van mijn moeder op den rand van mijn bed zag zitten	Karel Reijnders
1975	Bericht aan de reizigers	C. Buddingh'
1976	Snikken & Smartlapjes	Hermine Heijermans
1977	Even geduld a.u.b.	Mies Bouhuys; Herman van Run; Nico Scheepmaker
1978	Overkomst dringend gewenst	Marnix Gijsen
1979	Mooi kado	S. Carmiggelt
1980	De verdachte Verheugt	Janwillem van de Wetering
1981	De ronde van '43	Henri Knap
1982	De andere wereld	Marten Toonder
1983	Soms denk ik wel eens bij mezelf...	Wim Kan
1984	De Ortolaan	Maarten 't Hart
1985	Somberman's actie	Remco Campert
1986	De glazen brug	Marga Minco
1987	Het rookoffer	Tessa de Loo
1988	Een overtollig mens	Maarten Biesheuvel
1989	De Zwaardvis	Hugo Claus
1990	Sterremeer	F. Springer
1991	Het volgende verhaal	Cees Nooteboom
1992	Weerborstels	A.F.Th. van der Heijden
1993	In de mist van het schimmenrijk.	W.F. Hermans
1994	Transit	Hella S. Haasse
1995	Serenade	Leon de Winter
1996	Palmwijn	Adriaan van Dis
1997	Want dit is mijn lichaam	Renate Dorrestein
1998	De heilige Antonio	Arnon Grunberg
1999	De erfenis	Connie Palmen
2000	Het theater, de brief en de waarheid	Harry Mulisch
2001	Woede	Salman Rushdie
2002	De ijsdragers	Anna Enquist
2003	Gala	Ronald Giphart
2004	Spitzen	Thomas Rosenboom
2005	Zomerhitte	Jan Wolkers
2006	De grote wereld	Arthur Japin
2007	De brug	Geert Mak
2008	De pianoman	J. Bernlef
2009	Een Tafel vol Vlinders	Tim Krabbé
2010	Duel	Joost Zwagerman
2011	De kraai	Kader Abdolah
2012	Heldere hemel	Tom Lanoye
2013	De verrekijker	Kees van Kooten
2014	Een mooie jonge vrouw	Tommy Wieringa
2015	De zomer hou je ook niet tegen	Dimitri Verhulst
2016	Broer	Esther Gerritsen
2017	Makkelijk leven	Herman Koch
2018	Gezien de feiten	Griet Op de Beeck
2019	Jas van belofte	Jan Siebelink
2020	Leon en Juliette	Annejet van der Zijl
2021	Wat wij zagen	Hanna Bervoets
2022	Monterosso mon amour	Ilja Leonard Pfeijffer
2023	De Eerlijke Vinder	Lize Spit
2024	Gezinsverpakking	De Chabotten
2025	De Krater	Gerwin van der Werf
2026	Piaggio	Hendrik Groen

== Kinderboekenweekgeschenk ==
Year	Title	Author
1977	Wie je droomt ben je zelf	Paul Biegel
1978	De tram is geel het gras is groen	Gertie Evenhuis
1979	De klepel of de klok	Mies Bouhuys
1980	Spook tussen spoken	Willem Wilmink
1981	Je eigen tijd (Kinderboekenweekkalenderboek)	Thera Coppens, Gerda de Visser and Martine Schaap
1982	Retourtje ver weg (Kinderboekenweekkalenderboek)	Thera Coppens, Gerda de Visser and Martine Schaap
1983	Mijnheer van Dale en juffrouw Scholten	Kees Fens
1984	Een tijdje later	Paul Biegel and Willem Wilmink
1985	Houden beren echt van honing?	Midas Dekkers
1986	De zaak Jan Steen	Karel Eykman
1987	Die van hiernaast en van de overkant. Kinderen en boeken in Europa	Burny Bos
1988	Duizend dingen achter deuren	Joke van Leeuwen
1989	Het eiland daarginds	Paul Biegel
1990	Jorrie en Snorrie	Annie M.G. Schmidt
1991	Het wonder van Frieswijck	Thea Beckman
1992	Het raadsel van de Regenboog	Jacques Vriens
1993	Het weer en de tijd	Joke van Leeuwen
1994	Fausto Koppie	Anke de Vries
1995	Bombaaj!	Els Pelgrom
1996	De huiveringwekkende mythe van Perseus	Imme Dros
1997	LYC-DROP	Paul van Loon
1998	Mijn avonturen door V. Swchwrm	Toon Tellegen
1999	's Nachts	Wolf Erlbruch
2001	Wat rijmt er op puree?	Edward van de Vendel
2004	Swing	Paul Biegel
2006	Laika tussen de sterren	Bibi Dumon Tak
2007	Kaloeha Dzong	Lydia Rood
2008	Vlammen	Hans Hagen
2009	De wraak van het spruitje	Jan Paul Schutten
2010	Mees Kees – In de gloria	Mirjam Oldenhave
2011	Bert en Bart redden de wereld	Tjibbe Veldkamp
2012	Het Akropolis Genootschap en de slag om bladzijde 37	Tosca Menten
2013	Je bent super... Jan!	Harmen van Straaten
2014	Zestig spiegels	Harm de Jonge
2015	Per Ongelukt!	Simon van der Geest
2016	Oorlog en vriendschap	Dolf Verroen
2017	Kattensoep	Janneke Schotveld
2018	De eilandenruzie	Jozua Douglas
2019	Haaientanden	Anna Woltz
