= Gerwin van der Werf =

Dutch author

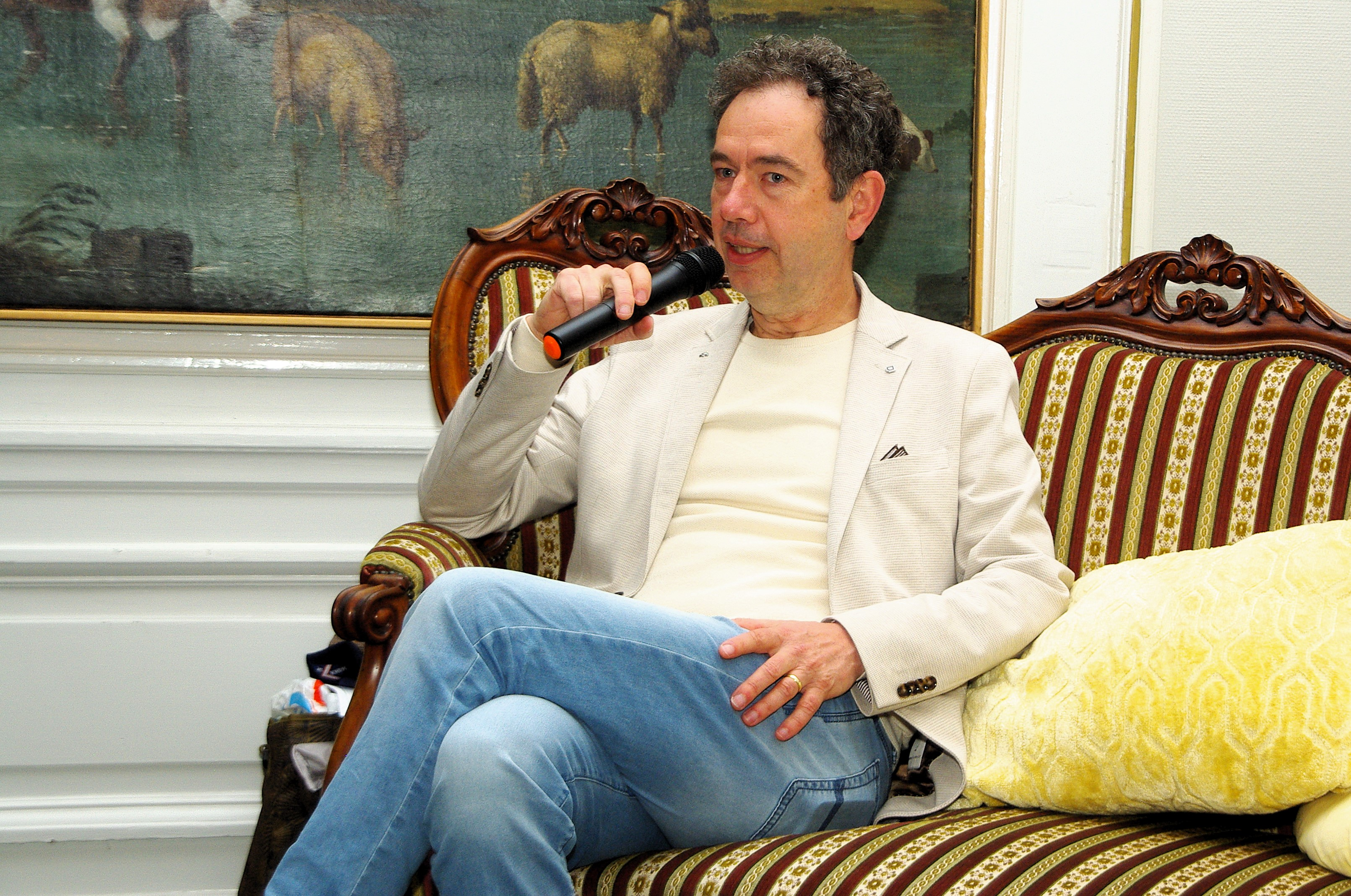
- van der Werf (2025)
- Born: June 13, 1969 (age 57); De Meern, Netherlands
- Occupations: Novelist, composer
- Website: muziekentekst.nl

Gerwin van der Werf (born 1969), brother of Ysbrand van der Werf is a Dutch author of novels, songwriter, and instrumentalist. In January 2010, his poem "Misbruik" ("Abuse") won the first prize of €10,000 (equivalent to €13,226 in 2023) in the Dutch Turing National Poetry Contest. In 2025 his novel De krater (The Crater) was selected as the Boekenweekgeschenk for the 90th Boekenweek.

== Biography ==
Gerwin van der Werf was born in De Meern and raised in Elburg, Netherlands. He studied musicology at the University of Utrecht and earned his doctorate in 1995.

Van def Werf is a part-time teacher at secondary school level, having worked in Voorburg and at the Rijnlands Lyceum in Oegstgeest.

=== Literary career ===
He has been a literary critic and columnist for Trouw since 2012.

A writer of poetry also, his literary career took off in 2009 when he won the Dutch Turing Poetry prize. A few months later his first novel, de Gewapende Man (The Armed Man), was published but to little acclaim. Over the next 15 years he wrote 6 more books, including Een onbarmhartig pad (An unmerciful path) a novel about a road trip around Iceland that was published in Dutch, English, and German in 2018; and Wilgeneiland (Willow Island) a novel that he set in Rijpwetering.

He was nominated for the Libris Literatuur Prize in 2012 for Wild, and shortlisted for Best International Crime Award at the 2023 Ned Kelly Awards for The Hitchhiker.

== Works ==
The Hitchhiker was a psychological drama where the protagonist Tiddo takes his wife on a tour of Iceland in a campervan to attempt to save their marriage, only to pick up hitch-hiker Svein along the way. The book was translated into English.

De krater is a road trip narrated by 17-year-old Eden, the sister of elder Johnny and younger Benjamin, who are all travelling to Steinheim am Albuch to visit its meteorite crater. They encounter many problems, including a failed car radio, no air conditioning, and running out of fuel. Eden faces challenges with her non-binary identity, and younger brother Benjamin is a space enthusiast whose depression his elder siblings hope to cure with the trip. It was the view of de Volkskrant's literary critic that being a schoolteacher enabled van der Werf to accurately portray teenage voices, as the three interact, teasing one another, which is a difficult task for adult writers. For the 90th edition of the Boekenweek, a week-long event promoting Dutch literature, a jury judged 149 submissions, the way the Boekenweekgeschenk used to be judged--the winner gets their book handed out for free to everyone in the country who buys a Dutch-language book at a book store. Van der Werf's De krater won.

- 2009 Tweede Prijs Zomerverhalen Schrijven Magazine
- 2008 Nomination '1000 woorden prijs'
- 2008 Third prize Dutch Paper Trouw writing competition 'Mijn betere ik’
- 2008 First prize Volkskrant writing competition "Vakantiegeluk”
- 2008 'Met woorden kan ik toveren' publicized in 'Mijn tweede Van Dale Luisterwoordenboek'
- 2008 First prize Trouw Schrijfwedstrijd "Een bekentenis”
- 2008 Pika Don, new musical production (RLO)
- 2006 Author 'Intro Muziek voor de Bovenbouw' (ThiemeMeulenhoff)
- 1998–2007 Macbeth, Oedipus, West Side Story & 6 andere theaterproducties (RLO)
- 1998 Antigone (Theater Imperium)
- 1997 Hamlet (RLO)
- 1996 Ten pieces for "New Belcanto", Dordrecht
- 1995 Belcanto Festival, opera pastiche (script, arrangements)
- 1994 Doctoral musicology Utrecht
- 1992 Composition-prize musicology
