= Simon van der Geest =

Dutch writer and poet

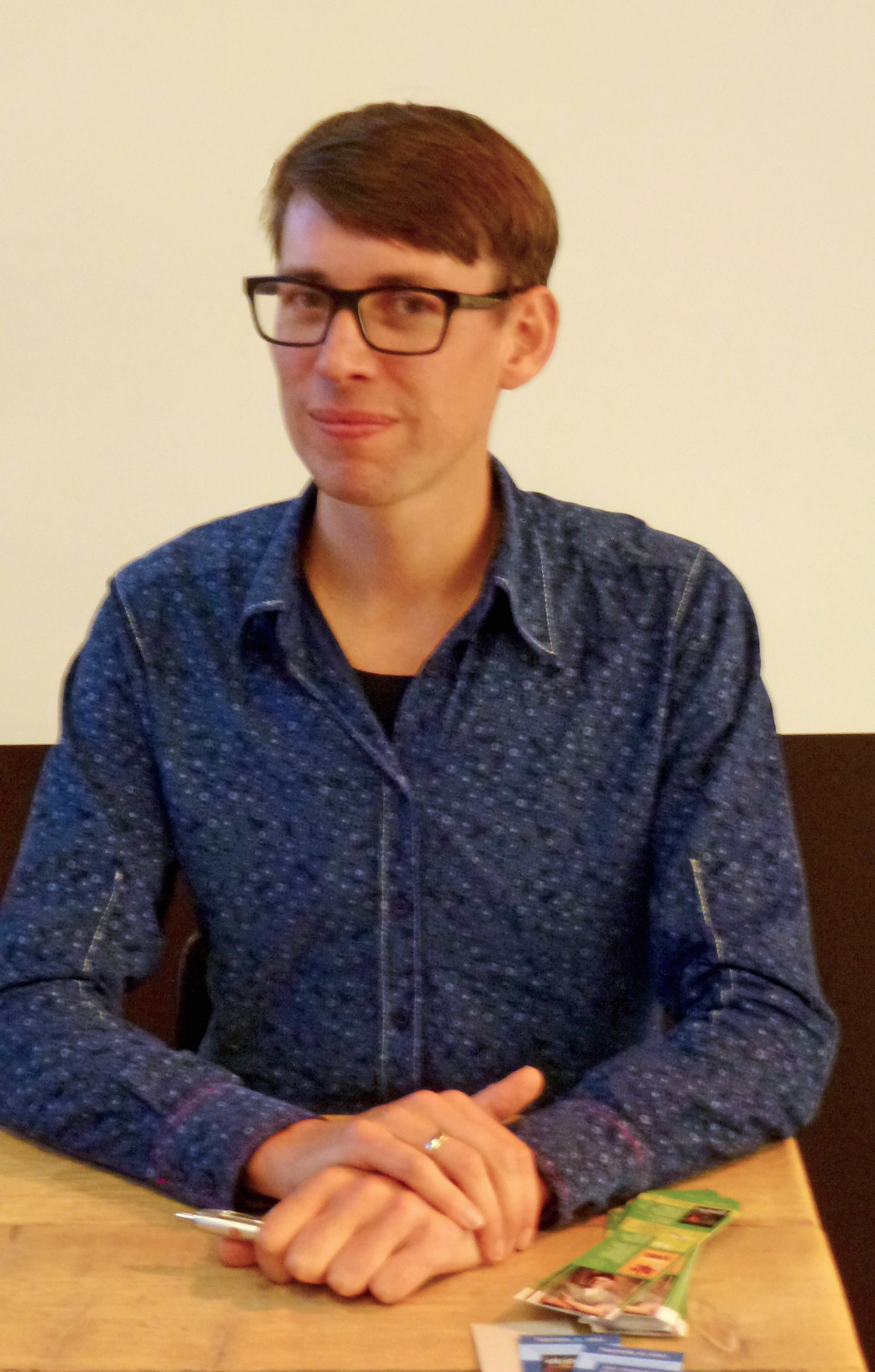
- Simon van der Geest (2015)
- Born: 12 February 1978 (age 47); Gouda, Netherlands
- Occupation: Writer
- Language: Dutch
- Notable awards: Gouden Griffel 2011 2013

Simon van der Geest (born 12 February 1978) is a Dutch writer and poet.

== Career ==
Van der Geest made his debut as children's writer in 2009 with the book Geel Gras.

He won the Gouden Griffel award twice: in 2011 for his book Dissus and in 2013 for his book Spinder. He also won the Jan Wolkers Prijs 2013 for the book Spinder.

In 2015, he published the book Per ongelukt!, the Kinderboekenweekgeschenk published during the Kinderboekenweek of 2015.

== Awards ==
- 2011: Gouden Griffel, Dissus
- 2013: Gouden Griffel, Spinder
- 2016: Vlag en Wimpel, Spijkerzwijgen
