= Oeroeg =

1948 novel by Hella Haasse

- First edition
- Author: Hella Haasse
- Language: Dutch
- Genre: Novel
- Publisher: Vereeniging ter Bevordering van de Belangen des Boekhandels
- Publication date: 1948
- Publication place: Netherlands
- Media type: Print (hardback & paperback)
- Pages: 79 (1st edition)
- OCLC: 8882899

Oeroeg (translated into English as "The Black Lake") is the first novel by Hella Haasse. First published anonymously in 1948, it has become one of the best-known Dutch novels and a staple of literary education for many Dutch schoolchildren. The novel, a Bildungsroman, is set in the former Dutch East Indies: the anonymous narrator grows up on a plantation in the Dutch colony of West Java, his childhood friend is a native boy of the same age. As the narrator grows up, he finds himself becoming estranged from his friend, as a result of the political and racial circumstances of colonial life. After having served in the army during World War II, he returns to his native land, only to be told that it is not where he belongs, and that he must leave.

== Background and publication ==
Oeroeg was published in 1948, at a time of great anxiety in the Netherlands over the future of their colony in the East; after the end of World War II it became clear quickly that Indonesia would be independent one way or another, and that the Netherlands would have to reconsider their status as a colonizing nation and, thus, the attendant claims of intellectual and cultural superiority. Author Rob Nieuwenhuys writes that post-revolution Indies literature was often called a "literature of longing and homesickness", with childhood memories a common theme.

The immediate impetus for the publication was the 1948 Boekenweek, the annual event held to promote Dutch literature; part of those festivities is the publication of a book given for free to the book-buying public. Hella Haasse, who had grown up in the Dutch East Indies, and at this time was working in the cabaret and theater business in Amsterdam, submitted the manuscript for Oeroeg (Note: The manuscript is now held in the Letterkundig Museum in The Hague.) under the Indonesian pseudonym "Soeka toelis" (modern spelling: Suka tulis, "Like to write"); her name wasn't announced to the general public until after the novel was published, selected by a panel of 19 anonymous judges. With Oeroeg, her first publication in prose (she had already published a number of poems), her reputation was established at once.

== Plot ==
The book starts in the preterite, "Oeroeg was my friend", and in reverse chronological order tells how the narrator came to that conclusion. The narrator grows up as the child of a white Dutch family on Java, with Oeroeg, a native young man; as high-school students, they live together in a boarding house. One crucial event is the death of Oeroeg's father, who was saving the narrator from drowning. During World War II, the narrator joins the Dutch army, and on returning to Java finds the world has changed: Indonesian nationalists have declared independence, and no longer accept colonial rule. In addition, the narrator's father is murdered, and he suspects his old friend Oeroeg, who has joined the Indonesian nationalist movement, of avenging his own father's death. At the end of the novel, the narrator has lost his friend, his identity, and his home country.

== Genre and themes ==
As a Bildungsroman the novel partakes of the Dutch tradition of similar novels, such as Terug tot Ina Damman ("Return to Ina Damman") by Simon Vestdijk (1934) and Character by F. Bordewijk (1936). At the same time, as Henk Maier points out, the novel can also be read against the background of Indonesian novels such as Abdoel Moeis's Salah Asoehan ("Wrong upbringing", 1928), and Sutan Takdir Alisjahbana's Lajar Terkembang ("With full sails", 1936), both novels "in which the relationship between the main protagonists, growing up in the colonial world, dissolves in conflict and death as often as it ends in a happy marriage". As a first-person narrative told retrospectively, Oeroeg, in which memory and experience are played off against each other, can be said to lack in the objective realism so often typical of the Bildungsroman; moreover, for Dutch readers it was clearly a novel set in a remote and exotic location, albeit one with which the Dutch felt an important kinship, and is thus a colonial novel as well.

In her autobiography Persoonsbewijs (Identity Card; 1967), Haasse described Oeroeg as "the dark side of herself living in the shadows she does not know". Nieuwenhuys finds this patently obvious, based on Haasse's background. Born and raised in a Dutch complex in the Indies, Haasse ("a white girl brought up in Dutch surroundings") had little contact with native residents of the archipelago. Agreeing with author Tjalie Robinson on the incorrect assumptions and generalities present in the novel, he writes that Haasse should have "really gotten to know Urug before even starting to write".

== Reception ==
Initially, the novel was not wholly uncontroversial; according to Maier, its publication was a painful experience for a number of Dutch readers, especially those wedded to the idea of the Netherlands as a colonial power and those who had lost friends, family, and possessions during World War II and the period of unrest and "rebellion" which followed, one which prompted military intervention from the Dutch army and eventually led to the independence of Indonesia. Criticism also came from the side of the colonized subject: Robinson criticized the novel and its author for pretending that the white, privileged colonizer could ever come to understand the humiliation and the desire for freedom on the part of the repressed other.

The novel has proven to be a mainstay of Dutch literature: generations of Dutch schoolchildren have read it, and at the time of Haasse's death in 2011, it had been reprinted more than fifty times. It has been referred to as "one of the most widely read and best loved books of modern Dutch literature." The novel was the centerpiece of a 2009 reading campaign organized by the Collectieve Propaganda van het Nederlandse Boek, a Dutch organization of booksellers and publishers. Haasse went on to write another book focused on the Indonesian archipelago, Krassen op een rots (Scratches on a Rock; 1969), which detailed a trip to an independent Indonesia—particularly Java. The archipelago also featured in her autobiographical works.

== Film ==
In 1993, the novel was adapted into a film of the same name, in a collaboration between the Netherlands, Indonesia, and Belgium. Directed by Hans Hylkema and with a screenplay by Jean Van de Velde, the film starred Rik Launspach, Jeroen Krabbe, Martin Schwab, Ivon Pelasula, and Jose Rizal Manua. This adaptation was also released internationally under the title Going Home, with an English dub.

The 1993 film version of the same name differs in some important details from the original; these changes, postcolonial scholars such as Pamela Pattynama argue, indicate important changes that occurred between the 1940s and the 1990s in Dutch attitudes toward their former colony and themselves. For example, the novel's interaction with natives are seen from the colonialists' perspective, and speaks in generally negative terms about Indo-Europeans. The movie, on the contrary, portrays the colonizer as tortured by guilt, and contains imagery of burned-down native villages reminiscent of the My Lai Massacre during the Vietnam War. By association, according to Pattynama, the film brought "long-silenced Dutch war crimes to the fore".

On the other hand, Ario Sasongko from the Jakarta Arts Institute argues that Pattynama's analysis of the film can be doubted through the editing and cinematography, which "portrayed the burning villages merely as Johan's nightmare" and the characterization of Depoh, an Indonesian character, as having "servant attitudes". Sasongko concluded that the film is a form of "defense" from an Orientalist viewpoint and Western superiority over the East, and tries to neutralize negative opinions on the military aggression into a postcolonial framework that is contextual for the era of the film's release.
