= Harmen van Straaten =

Dutch author and illustrator

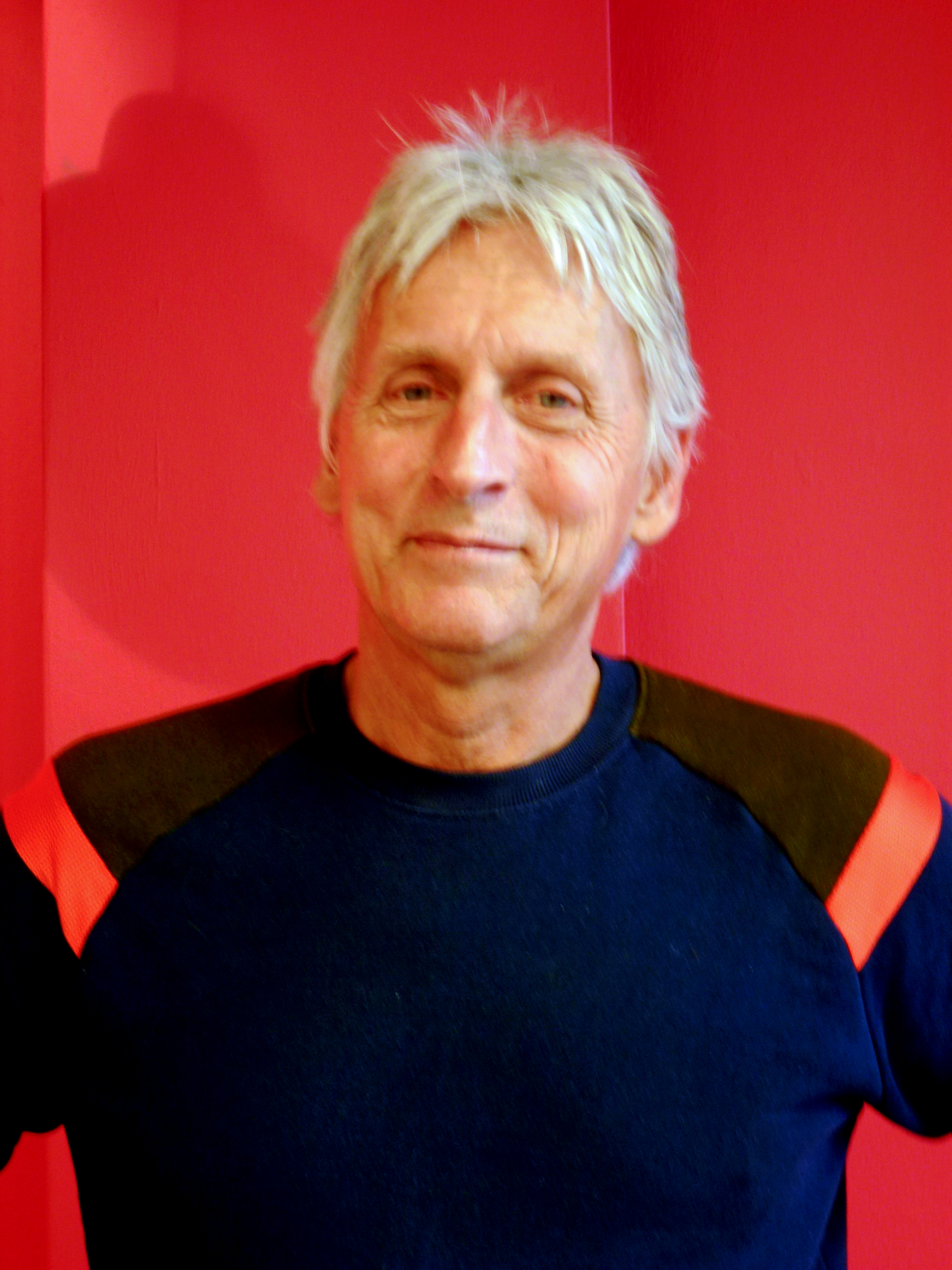
- Harmen van Straaten (2014)
- Born: 15 September 1958 (age 67)
- Occupations: author and illustrator
- Notable work: Je bent super... Jan! (English: You are super... Jan)
- Relatives: Peter van Straaten (uncle)

Harmen van Straaten (born 15 September 1958) is a Dutch author and illustrator.

== Life and career ==
He has illustrated books by numerous Dutch and Belgian authors, including Carli Biessels, Bette Westera, Hilde Vandermeeren and Jaap ter Haar.

In 2013, his book Je bent super... Jan! was the Kinderboekenweekgeschenk during the Boekenweek of that year.

His uncle Peter van Straaten was a Dutch cartoonist and comics artist.
