= Clare Lennart =

Dutch writer and translator (1899–1972)

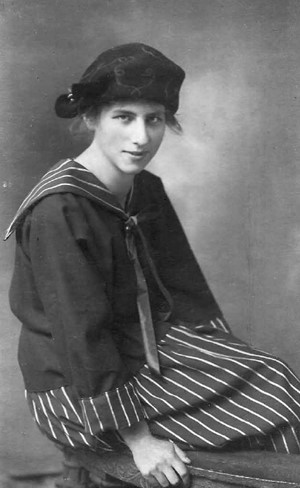
Clare Lennart (1920s)

Clara Helena Klaver (1899–1972), known by her pseudonym Clare Lennart, was a Dutch writer of fiction and children's literature. A prolific and popular author, she was mostly unknown to the Dutch literary world for much of her writing career from the 1930s to the 1960s. She worked as a school teacher and then made her living taking in lodgers, which also necessitated her using a pseudonym. A turning point in her career came in 1949, when her novella Twee negerpopjes ('Two Black Dolls') was the free gift for the book buying public during the Dutch Boekenweek of 1949. She could not dedicate herself full-time to writing until the early 1950s, when she stopped renting out rooms and her husband retired and could take over domestic duties. Afterwards, she published another half a dozen novels and a greater number of children's books, as well as a memoir.

Though she was a popular author with a personal writing style whose books sold relatively well, she did not make it into the canon of Dutch literature and is mostly forgotten.

== Biography ==
Clare Lennart was born in Hattem on 21 July 1899, the child of Luite Klaver and Gerarda Jacoba Doyera. Her grandparents ran a grocery store and owned a carpenter's shop, and her father worked at the post office before starting his career as a painter. She grew up on a country estate in Oldebroek where her father attempted to start a nursery to support himself, but he was no businessman. Clare and her younger sister Evelien were taught botany and natural science by their father, who was otherwise a cold and distant man. Their mother was trained in the arts and a much warmer person. She was interested in music and literature, and promoted woman's right to vote. When Clare was 10, the nursery failed and the family moved to Epe, where they had to live in a smaller house on a reduced income. Her mother contemplated divorce but the children argued against it; when her health failed, however, she moved in with her sister in Deventer. By that time Clare had already moved in with her mother's sister, preparing for the entrance exam to the teacher training college in Apeldoorn. She was admitted but hesitated to accept the offer, since her father had moved to Tongeren with her sister and brother, and her ailing mother had joined them. She started school in 1914 and was joined by her sister in 1916; in the meantime her mother had died and her father had remarried.

Lennart graduated in 1918 and began a teaching career that took her to various places and she ended up in Utrecht. In class, she amused her students with stories she made up and discovered a talent she had always had but never worked on. In Utrecht she started a relationship with Wim van den Boogard, a cook in the military, who was eleven years older than her and married; his Catholic wife refused a divorce, and the relationship brought her in conflict with the city government and she was forced to quit her teaching job in 1927. She took in lodgers, and hoped to make extra money by writing and publishing.

During the mobilization in the run-up to World War 2 she lived in Rotterdam: her partner had been transferred to nearby Delft, and she witnessed the German bombing of Rotterdam. She left for Utrecht, lived with her sister for a while, and again took up a residence where she could rent out rooms; for a while her father, who had wondered around and had had yet another failed career (as a technician in color photography), rented one of her rooms before moving in first with his son, and then with his other daughter. Lennart finally married van den Boogaard in 1947, after his wife had died. He retired in 1953, a year after Lennart stopped taking in lodgers and made writing her full-time employment. Van den Boogaard, a kind and caring man, took care of the household.

Her husband died in 1960, and it was a great loss for her both emotionally and practically. Her father died a half a year later. Writing became more difficult for her though she continued to publish—a novel, children's books, and finally a memoir. She fainted on 17 November 1972 and was found to have suffered a heart attack, which prevented her from attending the exhibition of her father's work, which was finally being recognized, on 2 December in Hattem. She died on 30 December 1972 in Utrecht.

== Writing career ==
Lennart's first short story, "Liefde en logica" ('Love and Logic'), was published in the literary magazine Groot Nederland. She published short stories in various magazines, and in 1935 published her first novel, Avontuur ('Adventure'). In 1936 she published Mallemolen ('Carousel'), a book she had written earlier based on her experiences taking in lodgers, which also necessitated her publishing under a pseudonym—Clare Lennart. That same year she published a book for girls, De wijde wereld ('The Wide World'), which won awards including a monthly award for the best book for young adults. She continued to published regularly—with the exception of the war years—for a growing audience. Many of her books were based on childhood memories and experiences, often derived from living on the country estate in her early years.

Much of her writing was done in between taking care of her lodgers, according to Petra Teunissen-Nijsse, especially given the Great Depression. Avontuur was written in part while stirring porridge—as she later told fellow writer Dolf Verroen—and the coffee grinds between the pages of the De blauwe horizon manuscript evidence her multi-tasking, writing her novels with a pencil in school composition books. The stress of running around taking care of sometimes petty demands from her lodgers found its way into her work, including in Mallemolen:

Dan gilt de fluitketel. We draaien. Meneer van der Wal heeft om scheerwater gevraagd. Meneer Wennekes, Christl's opvolger, roept me binnen. "Mevrouw, dit vond ik op mijn pantalon. Ik vind zoiets onaangenaam." En hij toont me in een leeg cigarettendoosje twee katteharen. Het zijn ontegenzeggelijk twee oranje haren van Bobby. "Neemt u ze mee." Ik vat het doosje aan, als ware het een bom. Zoo draaien we, en het heeft zeer zeker ook zijn komische zijde.

'Then the kettle screams. We turn around. Mister van der Wal asked for water for shaving. Mister Wennekes, Christl's successor, calls me in. "Madam, I found this on my pants. I find this unpleasant." And he shows me, in an empty cigarette box, two cat hairs. They are indubitably two of Bobby's orange hairs. "Take them with you." I accept the box as if it were a bomb. Thus we continue, and it certainly also has a comic aspect.'

The period between 1945 and 1960 was the most active part of her career, and one of the highlights was winning the competition for the Boekenweekgeschenk in 1949 with Twee negerpopjes ('Two Black Dolls'), another semi-autobiographical novella. That year is considered her breakthrough, and the over 150,000 copies of her book given out across the country raised her profile among her fellow writers, and publishers, as well. Publisher A. A. M. Stols pries her away from her previous publisher, A. W. Bruna, and after her husband's retirement in 1953 she was able to spend more time writing, expanding into journalism, writing opinion articles and reviews. Her 1957 novel De ogen van Roosje ('The Eyes of Little Rose') was also well received by critics.

Lennart also translated from English and French--books by Pearl Buck, Truman Capote, Colette, Charles Dickens, André Maurois, Dorothy Sayers, and others. She was also active as a board member of the Maatschappij der Nederlandse Letterkunde and on the staff of Elsevier Weekblad, Het Parool, and other newspapers, and she had a biweekly column in the Utrechts Nieuwsblad, the daily newspaper for Utrecht. She published a memoir, Weleer, in 1972; at the time of her death a second printing was in stores, and had started on a sequel. Her sister finished it, and it was published in 1976, as Weleer II.

== Critical reception ==
Lennart's children's books are often based on autobiography, most successfully in De wijde wereld ('The Wide World', 1936), which most obviously leans on her childhood on the nursery and her school experience. Nature plays an important part in all her books; it is a secretive thing that begs to be investigated, but also a refuge for those who need to escape the reality of everyday life. Cats are often important characters in her children's books, particularly in Prinsesje Mimosa, a fairy tale, in which cats live in little houses and dress like people. Human-like cats also figure in Iboe, a collection of poems, and in Kathinka uit de Kattesnorstraat ('Kathinka from Catwhiskerstreet').

The writer's identity and experience was also a topic in a highly positive radio lecture by poet and critic J. C. Bloem in 1946, when Lennart was still mostly unknown to the Dutch literary world even while, as Bloem noted, all her books sold out. He praised her five novels (and two shorter prose works), and citing from them concluded that the author was a keen observer of human nature, very interested in the distance between dream and desire. In his opinion, Tooverlantaarn and Huisjes van Kaarten were her best novels, and he was taken especially by her "masterful characterization", her sense of humor, and her originality.

Tooverlantaarn ('Magic Lantern', 1937) was praised by contemporary critic C. J. Kelk in a long chapter in which he distinguished between "real literature" and a mass of commercial novels written by "ladies and semi-ladies, clumsy historical poets, raconteurs, and whole- or half-lettered writers". Lennart was not one of those women, he said while wondering whether she was foreign-born, and summarized the novel (whose autobiographical elements are now evident), praising its willingness to include drastic plot turns and symbolism. This, he says, means Lennart is taking a step that regular Dutch novelists would not. G. J. van Bork describes her work as romantic and idealistic, tempered by the clash between dream and reality. Many of her characters attempt to withdraw from a bourgeois mentality, such as artists and bohemians. Petra Teunissen-Nijsse considers De ogen van Roosje (1957) to be her last great novel, and notes that Lennart had a loyal audience and consistently received positive reviews, even while the literary climate in the country was changing and Lennart's "poetic, picturesque style" now seems dated compared to the more sober style of the Vijftigers, who came to the fore in the 1950s.

According to literary scholar Conny Meijer, writing in 1988, critical reception of her children's books was lukewarm, and with the exception of De wijde wereld they did not manage to connect to her audience, unlike her novels for adults. Mostly forgotten today, she did not make it into the canon of Dutch literature for adult or children's literature, and some of her books are out of print.

== Publications ==
- Avontuur (Van Holkema & Warendorf, 1935)
- De blauwe horizon (Bruna, 1936)
- Mallemolen (Holkema & Warendorf, 1936)
- Tooverlantaarn (Bruna, 1937)
- Huisjes van kaarten (Bruna, 1938)
- Maanlicht. Een sprookje voor groote menschen (Bruna, 1939)
- Ter herinnering aan Rotterdam ('In Memory of Rotterdam', Bruna, 1946)
- Kasteel te huur (Bruna, 1948)
- Twee negerpopjes (Boekenweekgeschenk, 1949)
- Rouska (Nederlandsche Uitgeversmaatschappij, 1949)
- De blauwe horizon (reprint, with sequel added, Stols, 1950)
- Serenade uit de verte ('Serenade from Far Away', Stols, 1951)
- Liefde en logica. Novellen ('Love and Logic: Novellas', Stols, 1952)
- Stad met rode huizen ('City with Red Houses', Stols, 1954)
- Rouska (rev. ed. of the 1949 book, Stols, 1953)
- Op schrijversvoeten door Nederland (Boekenweekgeschenk, 1955)
- De ogen van Roosje. 's-Gravenhage, A.A.M. Stols, 1957)
- Scheepjes van papier (Stols/Barth, 1962)
- Utrecht. Stad en provincie (Holland, 1962)
- Twintig ramen aan de straat. Een vertelling (Nijgh & Van Ditmar 1965)
- Pluk een roos (Kosmos, 1965)
- Een mus op je vensterbank (1969)

=== Memoir ===
- Weleer (Nijgh & Van Ditmar 1971)
- Weleer II (Nijgh & Van Ditmar 1976)

=== Children's and young adult books ===
- De wijde wereld. Een verhaal voor oudere meisjes (van Nelle, 1935)
- Prinsesje Mimosa (Bruna, 1951)
- Kathinka uit de Kattesnorstraat (Stols, 1957)
- Iboe. Poesenversjes (Stols, 1961)
- Rinus Spoormuis (Stols, 1961)
- Martijn en Martientje (Holland, 1965)
- Kinderverhalen (Holland, 1965)
- De bosjespoesen (Holland, 1967)
- Het vrouwtje Tamarinde (Holland, 1970)
- Notitieboek voor poesen (Bakker, 1972)
