= Til Brugman =

Dutch author, poet and linguist

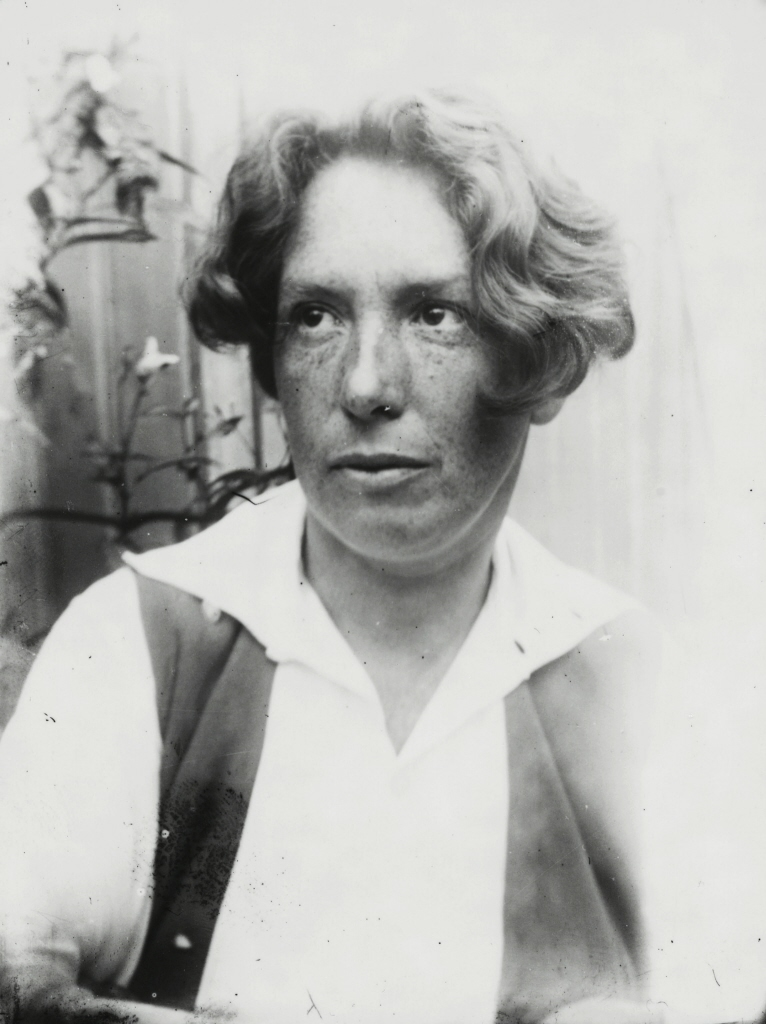
- Brugman in 1926
- Born: Mathilda Maria Petronella Brugman; 16 September 1888; Amsterdam, Netherlands
- Died: 24 July 1958 (aged 69); Gouda, Netherlands
- Movement: Dada, De Stijl
- Awards: Marianne Philips Prize - Novels Prize, Amsterdam

Mathilda (Til) Brugman (16 September 1888, Amsterdam – 24 July 1958, Gouda) was a Dutch author, poet, translator, and linguist.

== Biography ==
From 1926 to 1936, she lived in The Hague and later in Berlin with the German Dada artist Hannah Höch. In 1935, she published Scheingehacktes: Grotesken mit Zeichnungen von Hannah Höch.

In her apartment in The Hague, the music room was designed by Vilmos Huszár and supplemented with unique furniture of Gerrit Rietveld. A White Chair was designed by Gerrit Rietveld as a special commission for Til Brugman in 1923. Before Dutch Chair Designer Gerrit Rietveld painted the Red and Blue Chair, he made several mono colored ones. In the room a multi-colored end table by Gerrit Rietveld was also included.

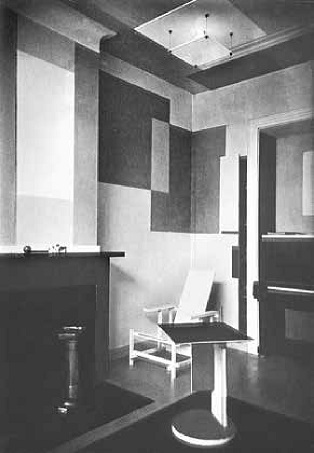
Til Brugman's Music Room

== Awards ==
In 1952, she received the Marianne Philips Prize and the Novels Prize (Amsterdam) for her work.

== Selected works ==
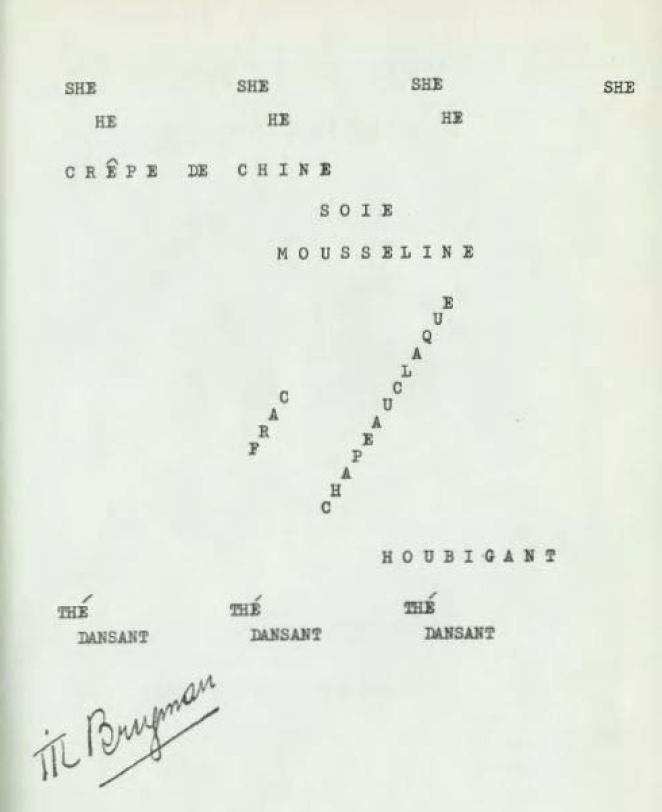
Til Brugman’s English and French language poem “SHE HE”

- Das vertippte Zebra : Lyrik und Prosa
- Schijngehakt : grotesken en novellen
- Even anders : vier rabbelverzen
- Lust en gratie
- 5 klankgedichten
- Tot hier toe en nog verder : notities
- Wat de pop wist
- Spiegel en lachspiegel
- Eenmaal vrienden altijd vrienden
- De zeebruid : roman
- Kinderhand
- De vlerken
- Spanningen
- Maras Puppe : eine Puppe erzählt aus ihrem Leben
- Wiben en de katten
- De houten Christus
- Tijl Nix, de tranendroger
- Bodem : Marcus van Boven, Gods knaap
- Scheingehacktes (Grotesken mit Zeichnungen von Hannah Höch)
- Den Haag, KB : 68 D 97a / Brief van Mathilda Maria Petronella Brugman (1888–1958), geschreven aan Rina Louisa Marsman-Barendregt (1897–1953); Brieven, voornamelijk van letterkundigen aan H. Marsman en/of Rina Louisa Marsman-Barendregt
- Den Haag, KB : 135 B 333 / De kunstenaar ís zijn werk; Verzameling brieven, foto's, manuscripten e.d. van voornamelijk beeldende kunstenaars, gericht aan en bijeengebracht door Dorothy Mathilda Suermondt (1912–1988) onder meer secretaresse bij de firma Martinus Nijhoff te Den Haag. Achtereenvolgens gehuwd met Josephus Judocus Zacharias ('Jos') Croïn (1894–1949), schilder en Christiaan W. Zeylstra

=== Some translations by Til Brugman and collaborations with others ===
- De schooiertjes van Napels - Karl Bruckner
- De rijkdommen der aarde : over het huishouden der mensheid : economische aardrijkskunde voor iedereen - Juri Semjonow
- De wonderlamp : een kleurig verhaal uit Bagdad - Max Voegeli
- Giovanna - Karl Bruckner
- Penny : het geheim van de jonk van de vriendelijke oostenwind - Hans Baumann / G.B. van Goor
- Vevi - Lillegg, Erica / C.P.J. van der Peet
- Noes is niet voor de poes - Adrian, G. / C.P.J. van der Peet
- De wonderlamp : een kleurig verhaal uit Bagdad voor de jeugd - Max Voegeli
- Paul Klee, 1879-1940 - Will Grohmann
- De mallemolen - Hans Baumann / G.B. van Goor
- Deta en haar dieren : de geschiedenis van een diergaarde-directeur en zijn jonge assistante - Gerti Egg / G.B. van Goor
- De Stijl, 1917-1931 / The Style, 1917-1931 The Dutch contribution to modern art. [Containing essays by Piet Mondriaan, translated by Til Brugman. With a bibliography.] by Hans Ludwig C Jaffé

== Sources ==
- Marleen Slob, 'De mensen willen niet rijpen, vandaar' : leven en werk van Til Brugman, 1994.
