= Raveleijn =

Theatre at Efteling

Coordinates: 51.6532°N 5.0459°E

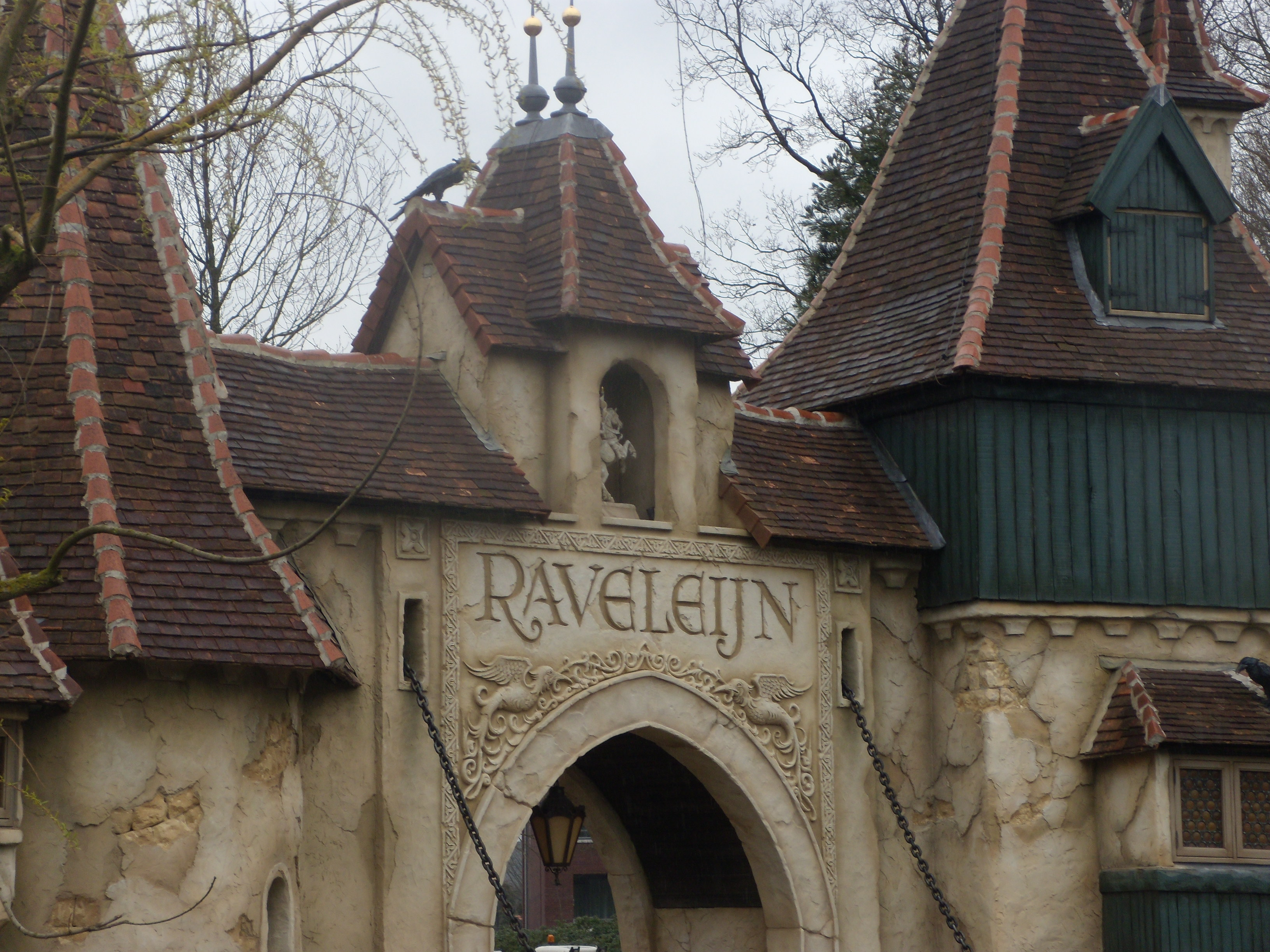
Entrance of Raveleijn.

Ravelin (or "Raveleijn" in Dutch) is a theatre at the Efteling amusement park in the southern Netherlands. It was designed by Sander de Bruijn at a cost of €30 million and opened its doors on April 8, 2011.

== History and details ==
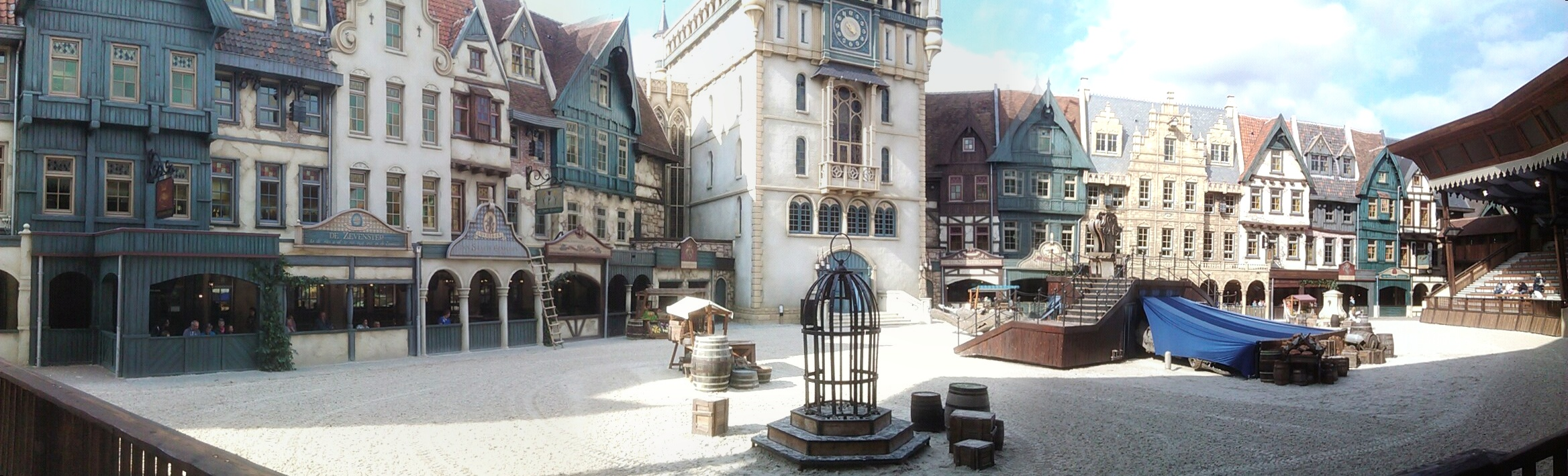

Raveleijn is a multifunctional complex with, amongst others, a theatre, conference hall, restaurant and offices. The main part of Raveleijn is the arena where 5 shows (30 minutes) are performed per day. The open-air arena has a capacity of 1,200 visitors on a total of 1450 m2. The cast has 10 members and the music was composed by René Merkelbach and Het Brabants Orkest with vocals by Anneke van Giersbergen and others. The pen for the animals (5 horses, 1 owl, 1 falcon and 5 ravens) is located next to the parking area. Another main show element is a five-headed, mechanical dragon named draconicon.

== Show ==
The story was written by Paul van Loon and tells the tale of the Woudenberg family of seven who move to the edge of a forest. The children discover an old city gate in the forest, where a tyrant oppresses the people. As it turns out, the five kids have the special gifts needed to fight the tyrant. This story has also been made into a Book, as well as a 12-part miniseries, where more of the plot is revealed.

The show got an update from 30 April 2013 and after, still using the original tale, but with a new decor and some script changes. This new show is produced in partnership with the French theme park Puy du Fou which is renowned for its large open air park shows.

=== Plot summary ===
The show starts with the father of the Woudenberg family, walking among the visitor seats saying he has lost his children. After that the main show starts, four of the Children (Thomas, Maurits, Emma and Lisa) walk up to the gate of Ravelin, read the text on the gate, and walk through it. They emerge again, now older, on horses and in armour. They meet up with their younger brother Joost, who says he had discovered the gate before them.

Countess Halina warns them that a falcon is coming, announcing the arrival of the evil count Olaf Grafhart. The count emerges from the water and asks what they are doing in his city. Thomas, the oldest brother, says they are here to free the people of Ravelin of his rule. The count calls his guards, and when Halina stands up for the siblings, he makes her disappear. A fight ensues.

When the siblings emerge victorious, count Olaf calls on his Draconicon, which emerges from the foliage. Thomas calls on his brothers and sisters to make use of their elemental powers, which they got from their weapons. After Draconicon is defeated, the siblings surround count Olaf and Countess Halina is returned. The count is driven back into the water by Halina, and disappears. The siblings go back through the gate, and emerge again in their normal clothes. Here they are also reunited with their dad, and the show ends.

== Gallery ==
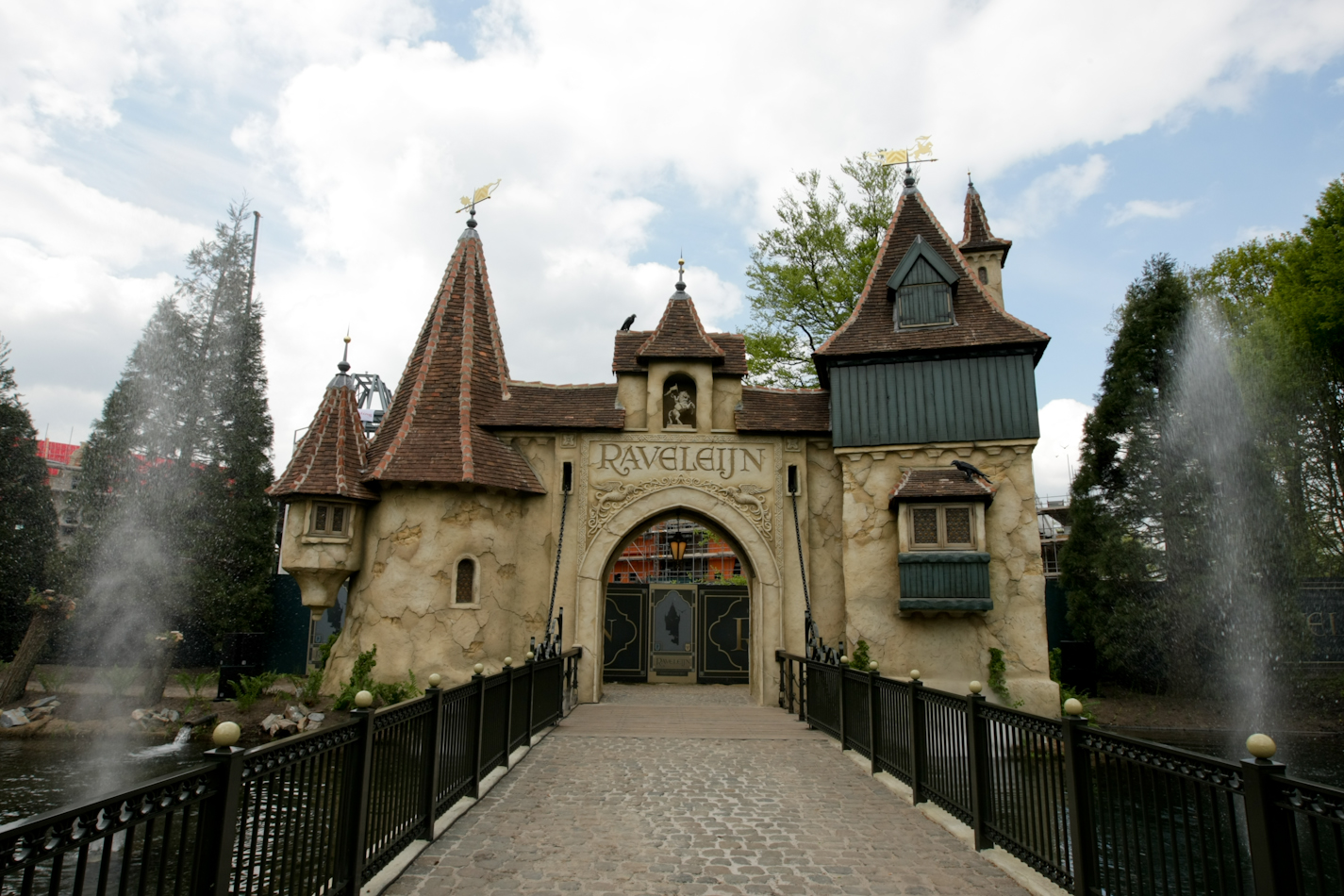

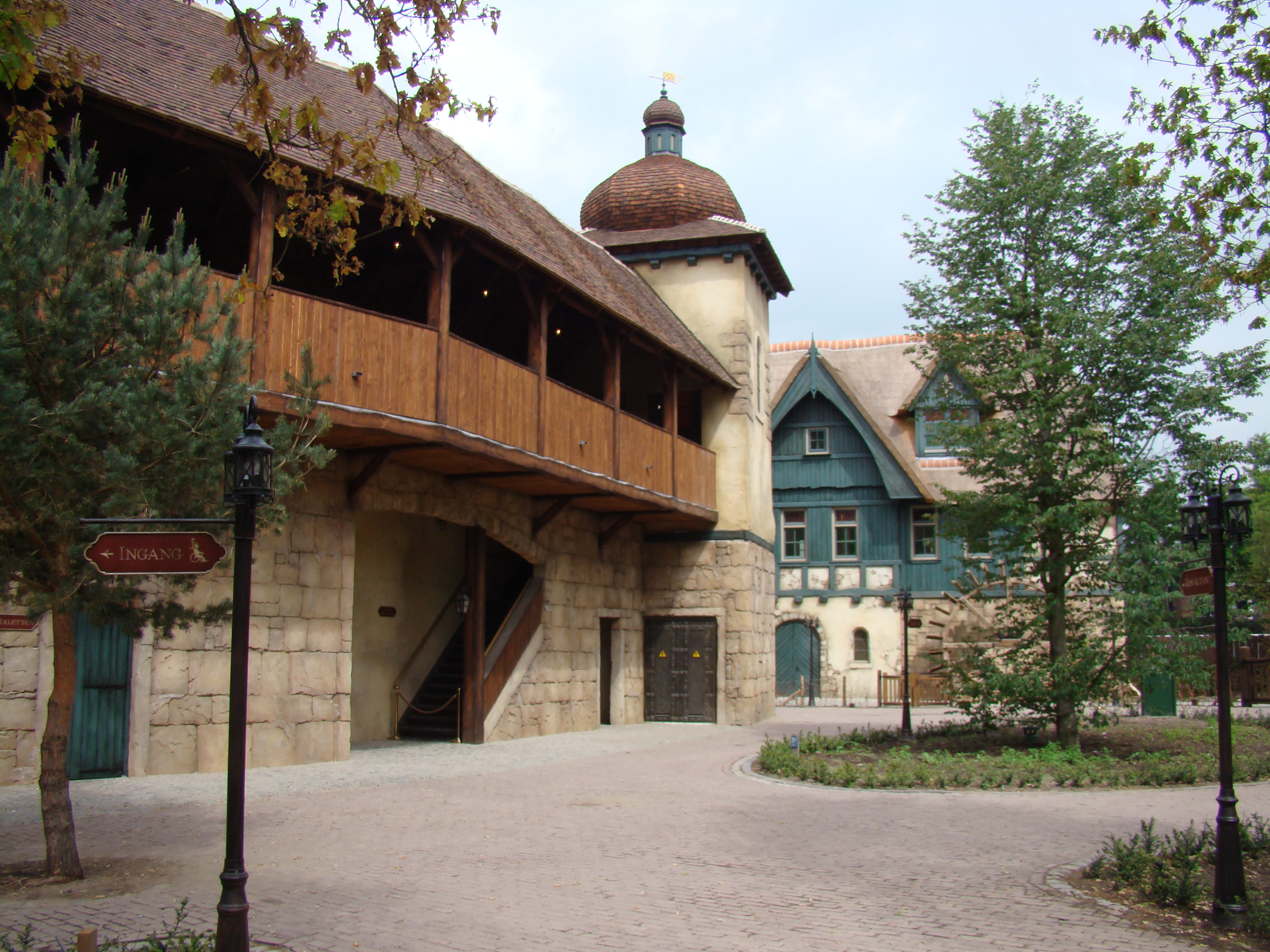

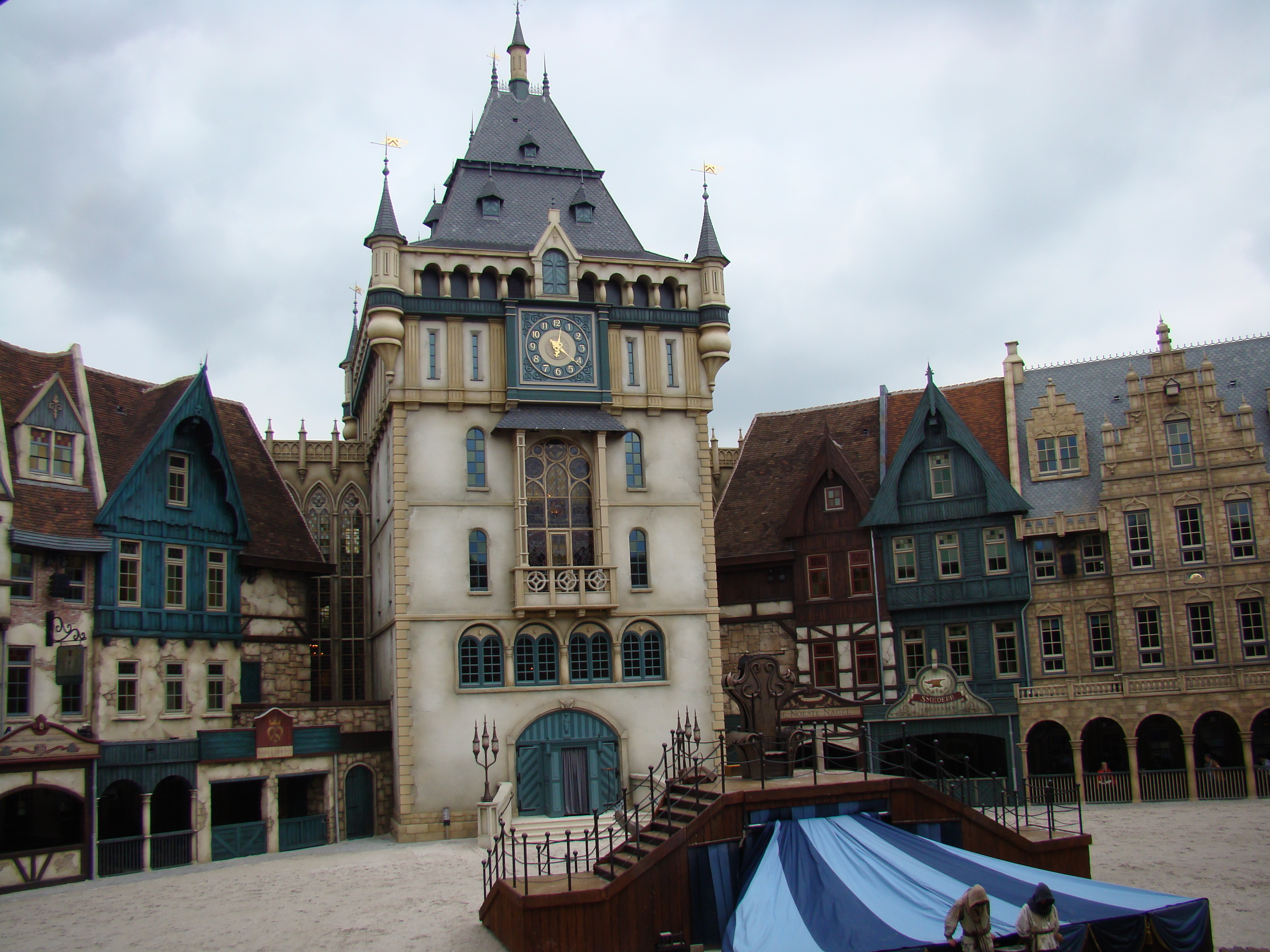

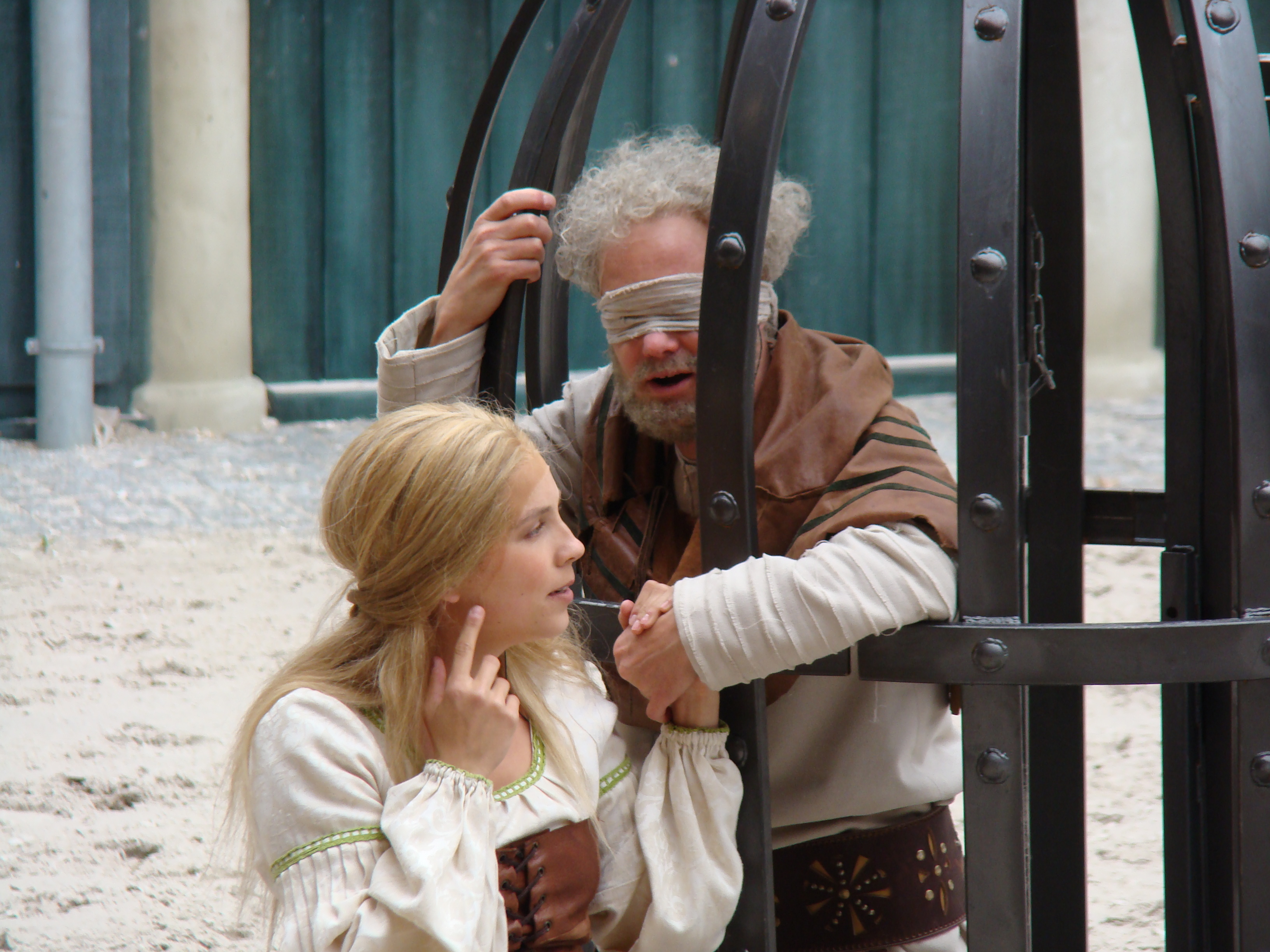

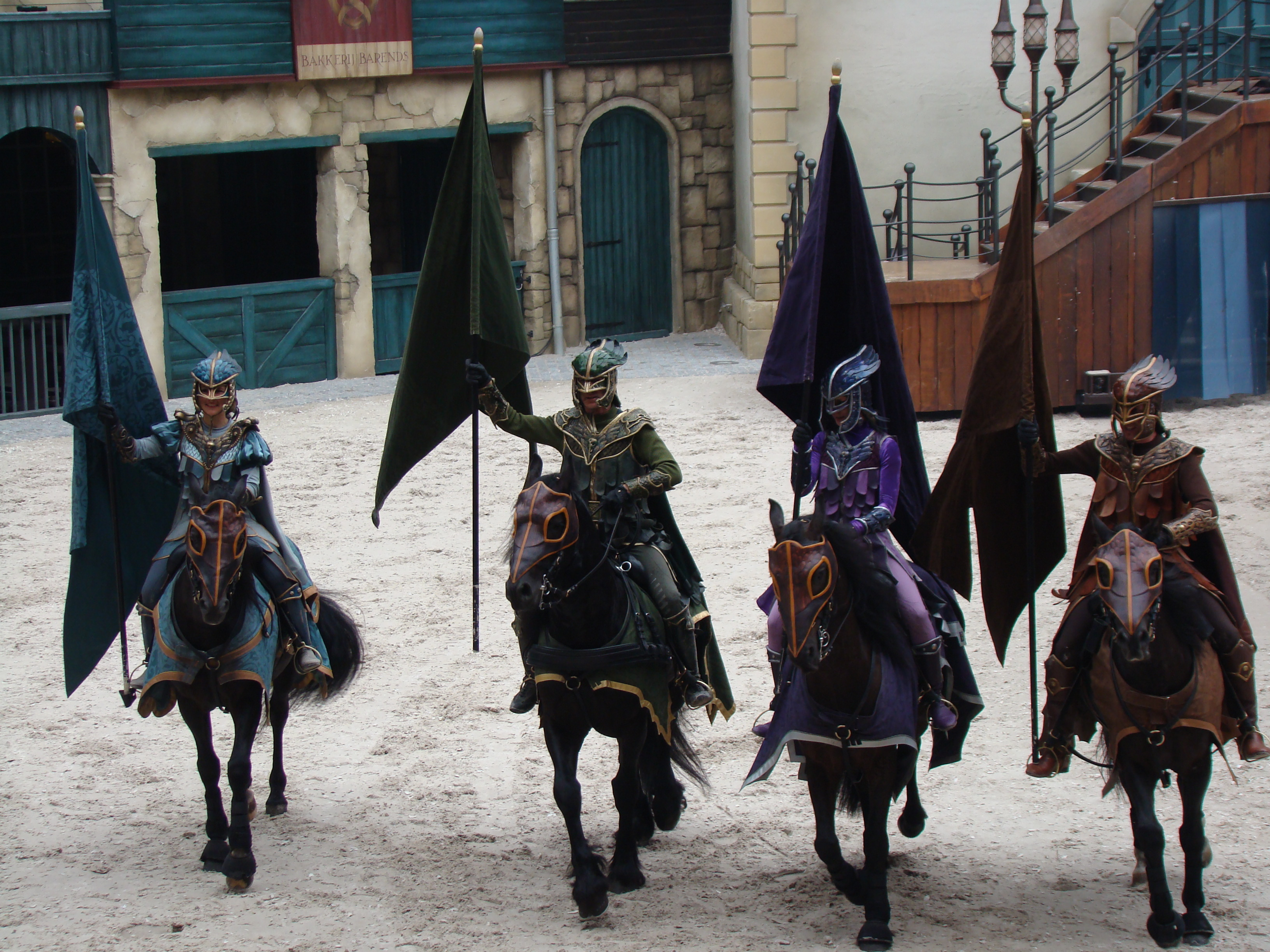

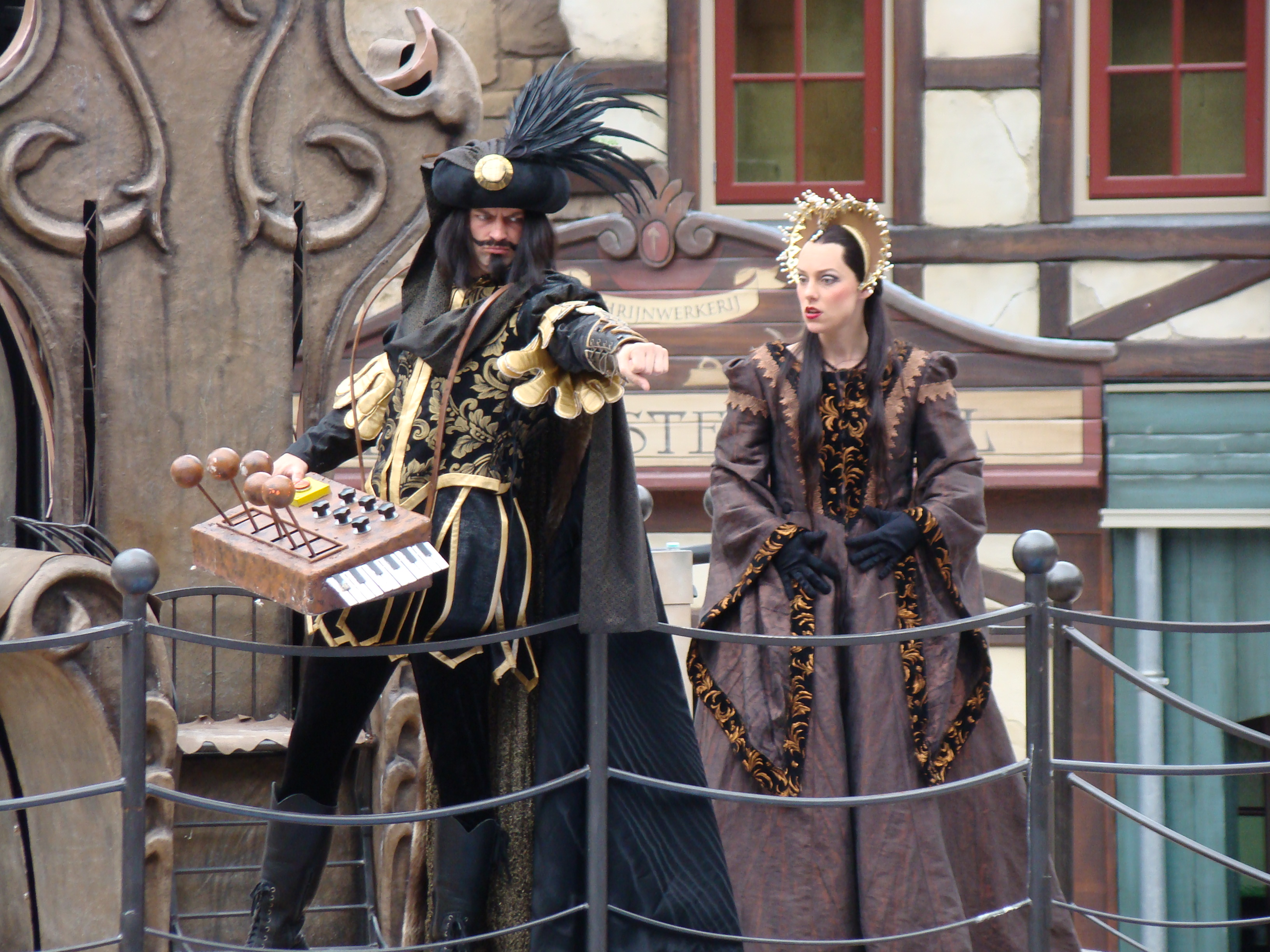

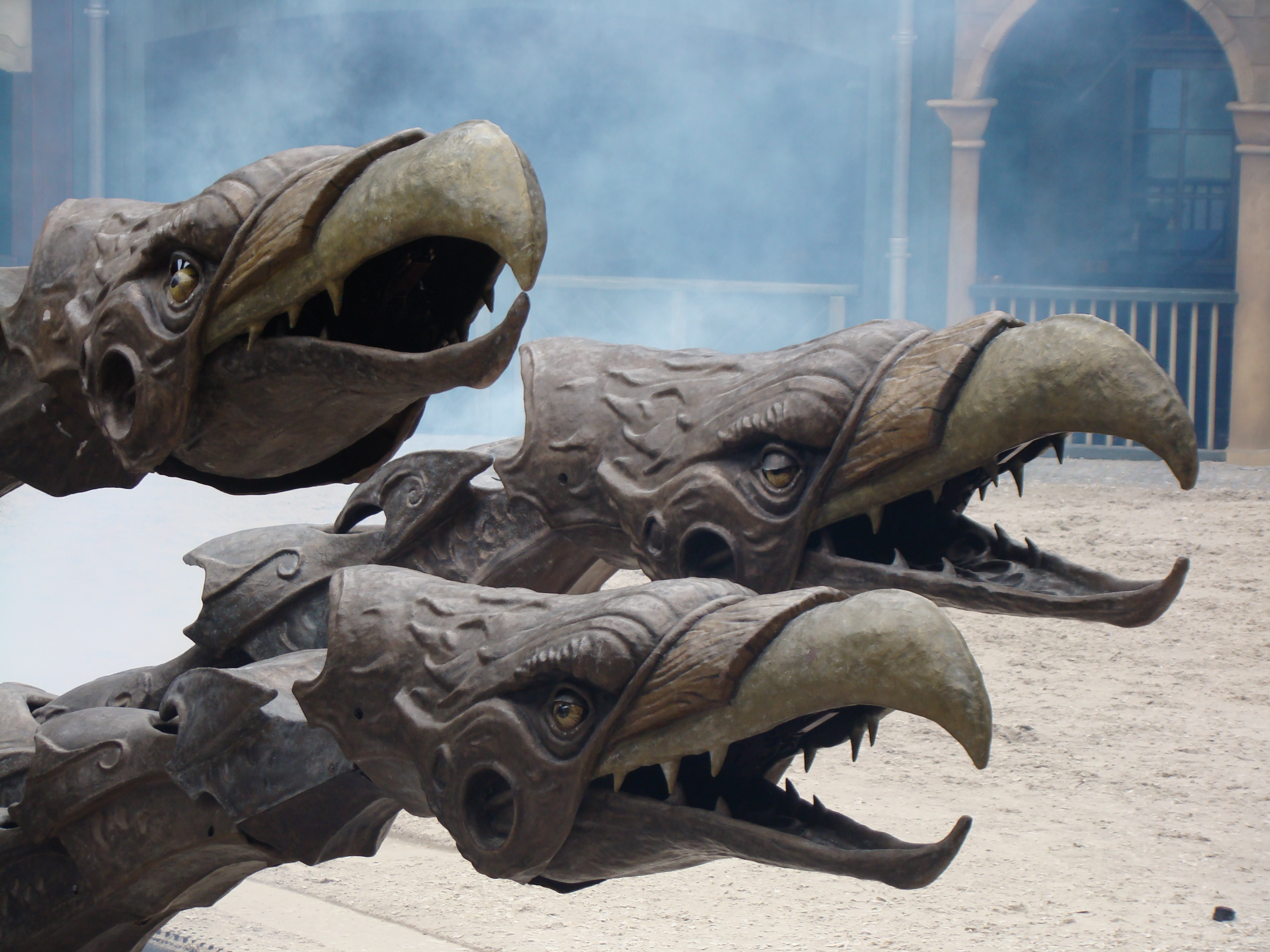

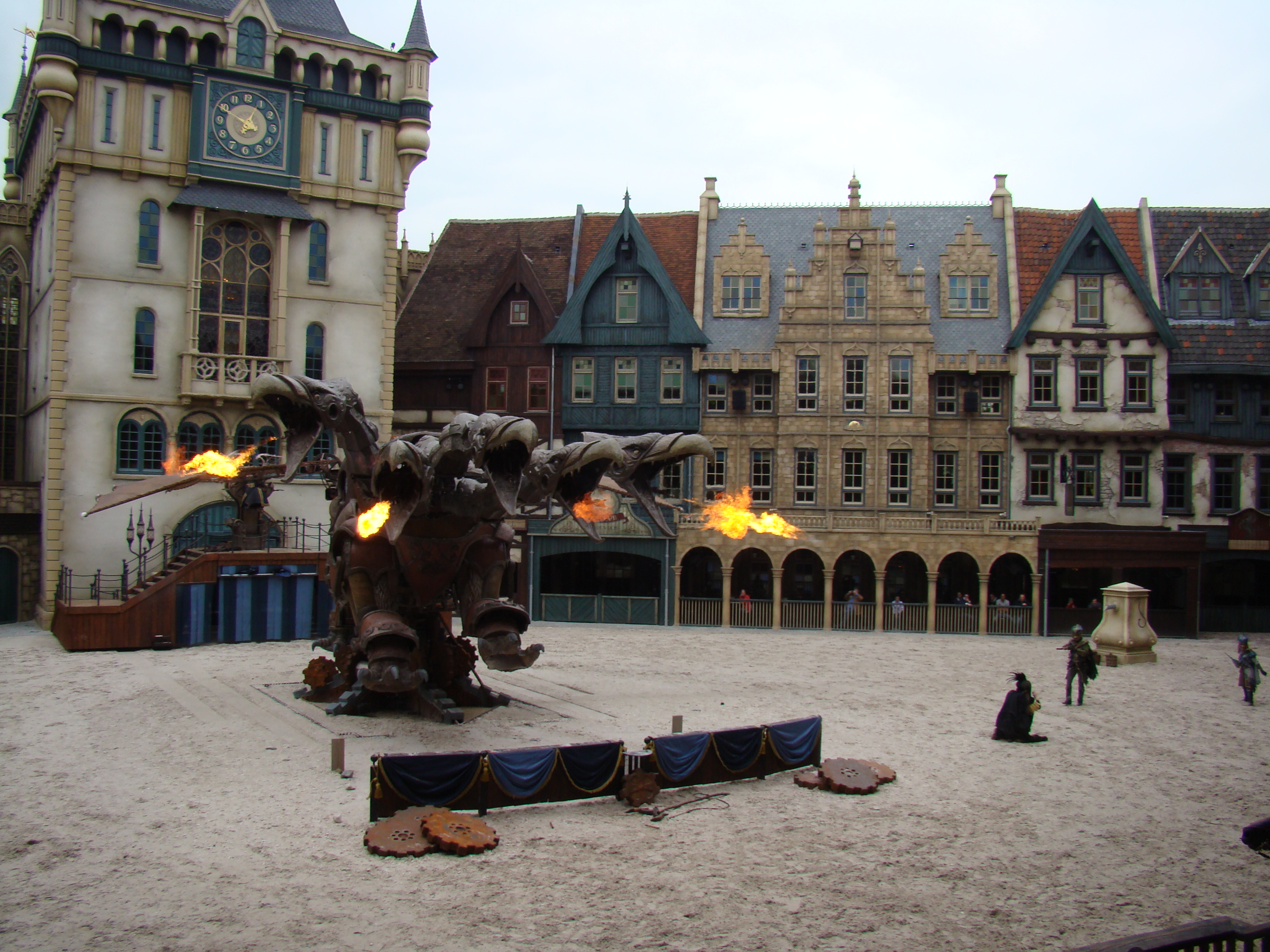

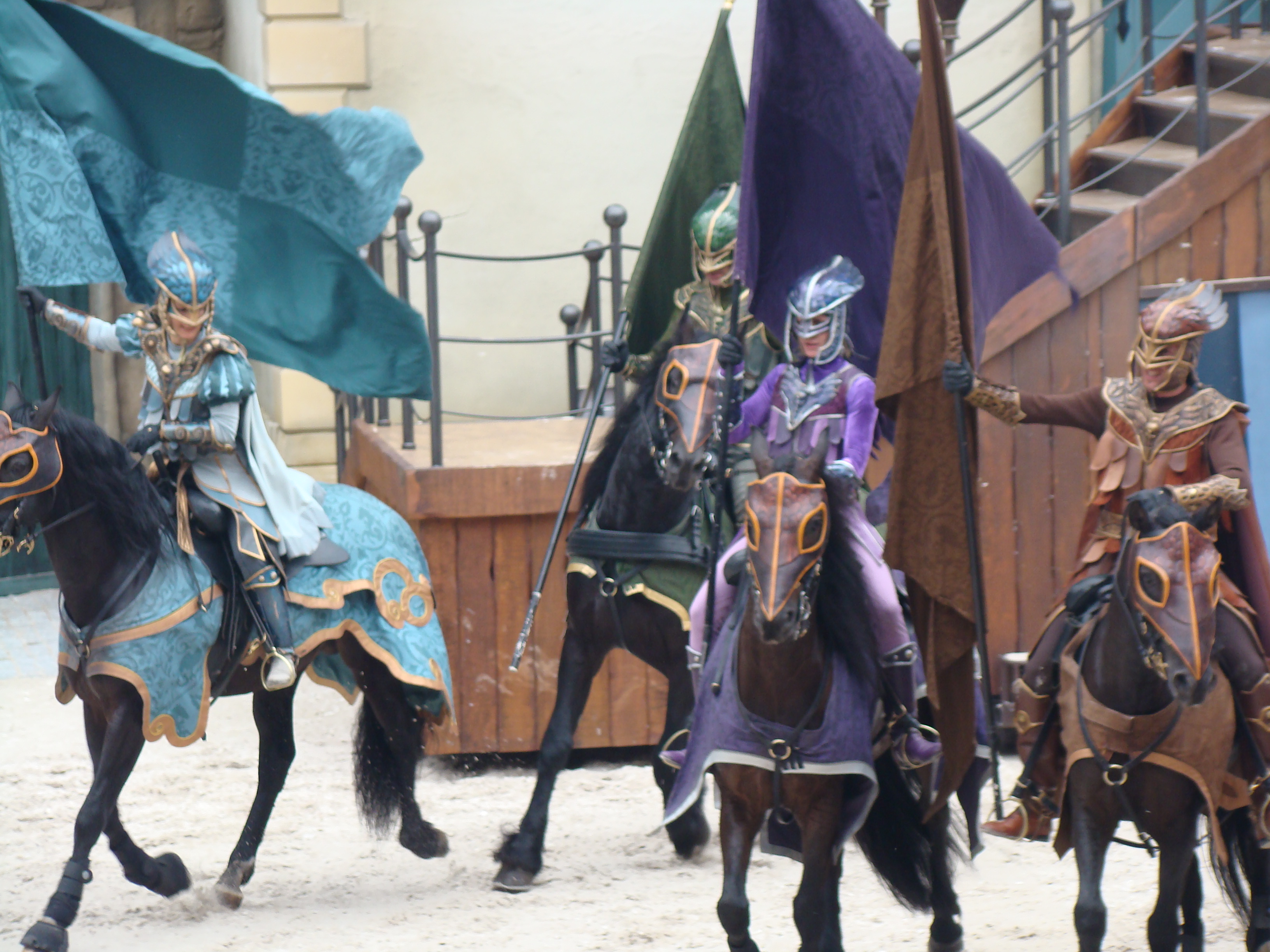

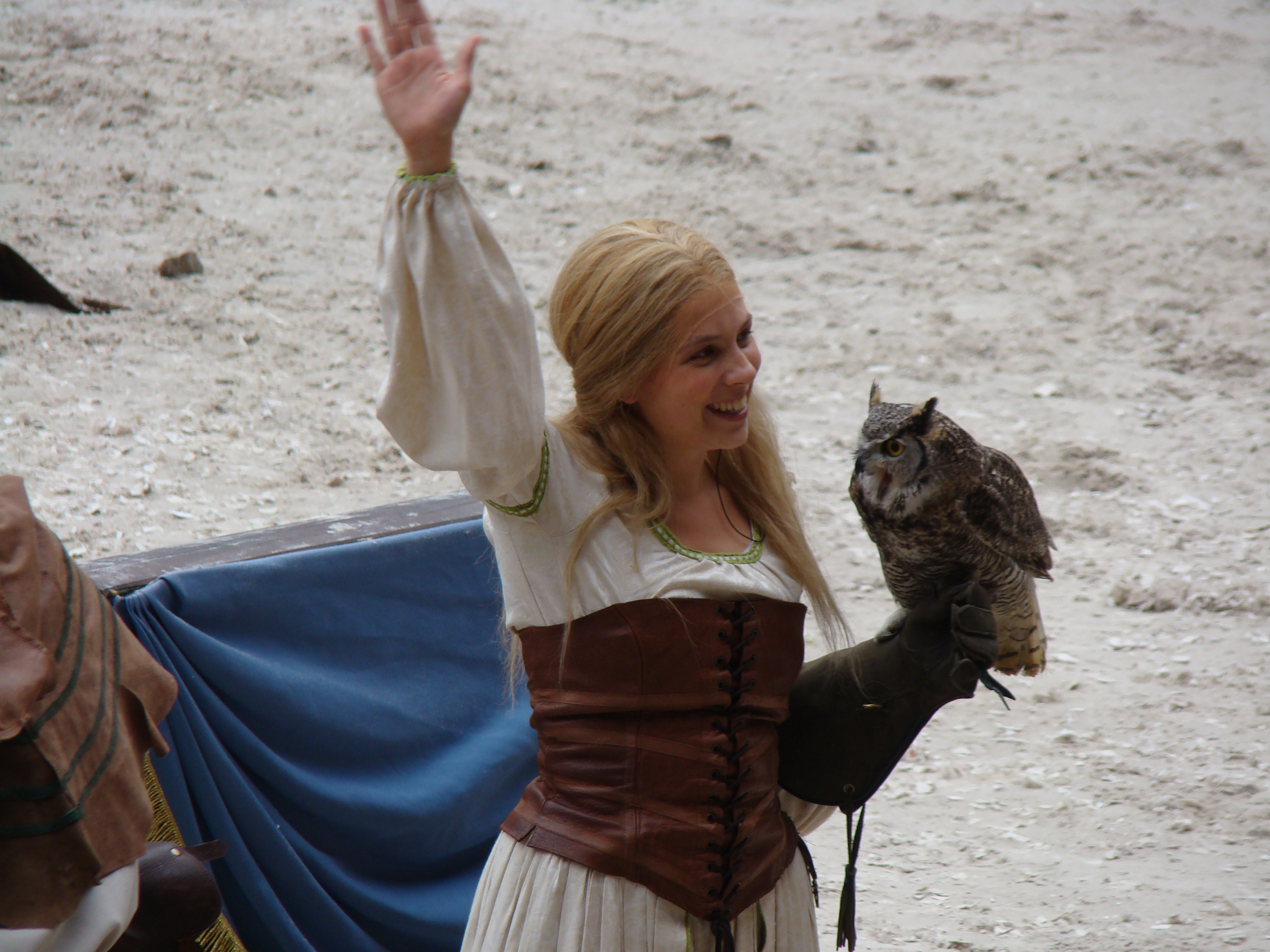
