= Paul van Loon =

Dutch children's author (born 1955)

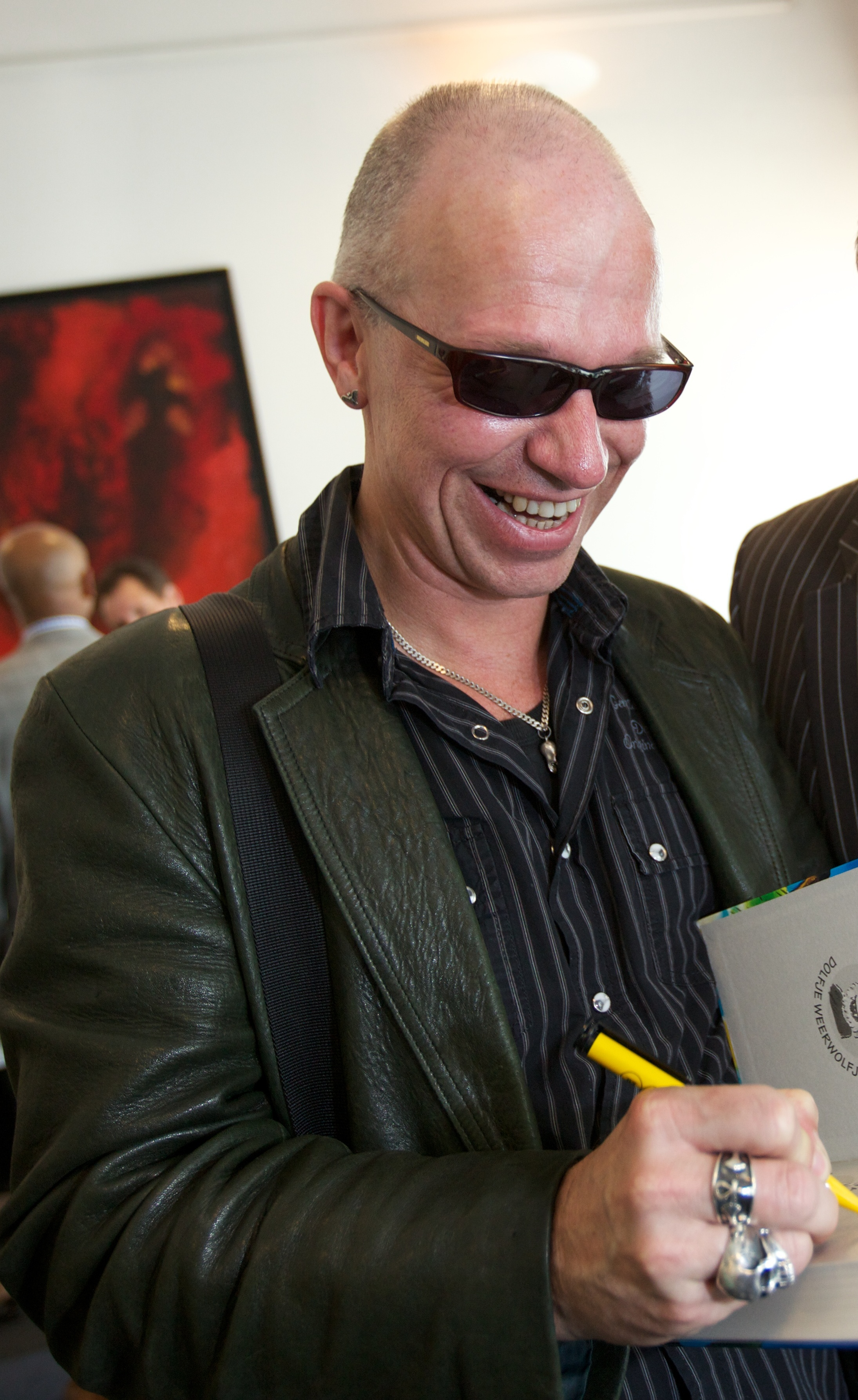
- Born: 17 April 1955 (age 70) Geleen, Limburg, Netherlands
- Occupation: Writer
- Language: Dutch
- Notable awards: Prijs van de Nederlandse Kinderjury (6-9 years) 1996, 1998, 2000, 2004, 2006, 2007, 2008, 2009; Prijs van de Nederlandse Kinderjury (10-12 years) 1996, 1997; De Pluim 2012

Paul van Loon (born 17 April 1955) is a Dutch author of children's literature. Notable series by van Loon include Dolfje Weerwolfje and De Griezelbus (book series), both of which have been adapted into theatre productions and films. His book Raveleijn was adapted into a television series and an amusement park show in theme park Efteling.

== Biography ==
In his youth, van Loon read the books of Tolkien, Bram Stoker, and H. P. Lovecraft, as well as local folklore such as Het Limburgs Sagenboek. He enrolled in the Art Academy of Den Bosch to become an illustrator but did not complete his studies. His first published short-story appeared in Brabants Nieuwsblad in 1977, after which he was also published in Donald Duck Weekblad, Okki, Taptoe and, Ezelsoor.

Van Loon's first book, Boven op tante Agaat, was published in 1983. His work Foeksia de miniheks was published in 1989, and in 1997 he wrote the kinderboekenweekgeschenk LYC-DROP, which was re-published in 2002 as Wolven in de stad. In 1997 Van Loon also wrote Dolfje Weerwolfje. Many of his books are illustrated by Hugo van Look.

== Personal life ==
In addition to being a writer, van Loon is also a guitarist. He is married and has a daughter. He lives in Drunen. He frequently tours through the Netherlands to give talks about his books to younger audiences.

== Selected bibliography ==
- 1984 - Boven op tante Agaat (Zwijsen)
- 1989 - Foeksia de miniheks (Oberon / 2nd print 1995)
- 1991 - De Griezelbus 1 (Elzenga / 24th edition Leopold 2002)
- 1997 - Dolfje Weerwolfje (Leopold)
- 2007 - Weerwolfgeheimen (Leopold)
- 2009 - Een weerwolf in de Leeuwenkuil
- 2011 - Raveleijn (Leopold) - (commissioned by De Efteling)
- 2011 - SuperDolfje (Leopold)
- 2012 - Weerwolf(n)achtbaan (Leopold) - in collaboration with De Efteling
- 2016 - De Sprookjessprokkelaar (Leopold) - in collaboration with Princess Laurentien (commissioned by De Efteling)
- 2017 - De bende van de Witte Veer (Leopold) - (commissioned by De Efteling)

== Adaptations ==
- 2004 - Dolfje Weerwolfje (Theatre)
- 2005 - Gruesome School Trip (film)
- 2010 - Fuchsia the Mini-Witch (film)
- 2011 - Alfie, the Little Werewolf (film)
- 2011 - Raveleijn (TV series) (TV series)
- 2013 - De Leeuwenkuil (TV series)
- 2016 - Meester Kikker (film)
- 2017 - Sprookjessprokkelaar (Theatre)
