= Luite Klaver =

Dutch painter

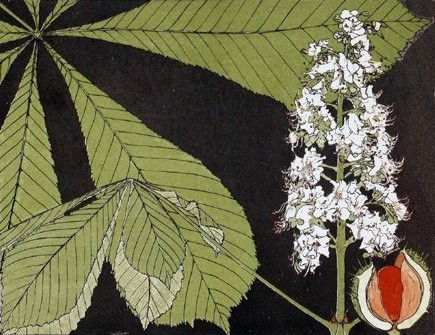
Aesculus hippocastanum – Horse chestnut (1905)

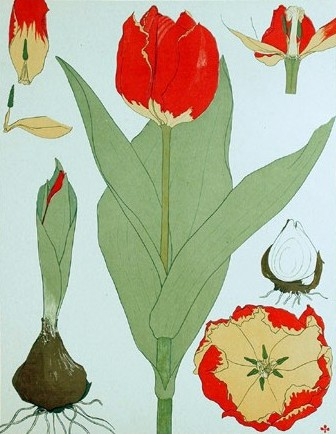
Tulipa gesneriana (1905)

Luite Klaver (21 September 1870 – 28 November 1960) was a Dutch painter, lithographer and inventor.

Klaver was born in Hattem, Gelderland, the son of Hendricus Jacobus Klaver, a carpenter and grocer, and Evelina Lubberta Barendsen.

His talent as artist was apparent from an early age. He worked as an apprentice carpenter for some years and received painting tuition from another Hattem resident, the landscape painter Jan Voerman Snr. In 1892 he arrived in Amsterdam to study painting. Here he met fellow student Gerarda Jacoba Doyer, born in Deventer on 4 May 1864, to a family of French Huguenot descent. They were married in 1898 and settled in Oldebroek, where Luite started a nursery growing flowers and vegetables. He happened to be the first horticulturist to cultivate Gerberas. His artistic talent and scientific accuracy in depicting plants is evident in the numerous lithographs that appeared in six books, published by Sederius and S.L. van Looy.

Between 1895 and 1898 Klaver studied at the Rijksnormaalschool in Amsterdam, which trained high school teachers. He also photographed art works for van Meurs and Co, augmenting his income.

Luite and Gerarda had three children born in Oldebroek – Clare Helena (1899), Eveline Hendrika (1902) and Dirk Anton (1911). Gerarda died in 1915 of tuberculosis. Luite and the 3 children finally settled in Hattem on the estate of Molecaten. In 1918 Luite married Gerarda's niece, Egberta Hendrika Barendsen (born in Kampen on 19 October 1875 and died in 1945). They later moved to Soestduinen, where he was part of the management of a factory producing photographic materials.

Luite became interested in colour photography and patented various cameras using dichroic filters and glass plates coated with colour-sensitive emulsions. A gallery of his photographs is at the Prentenkabinet Museum in Leiden. Most of his paintings belong to his descendants, while some are with the Voerman museum in Hattem.

He died, aged 90, in Utrecht, and was buried in Driebergen.
