= Nescio =

Dutch writer

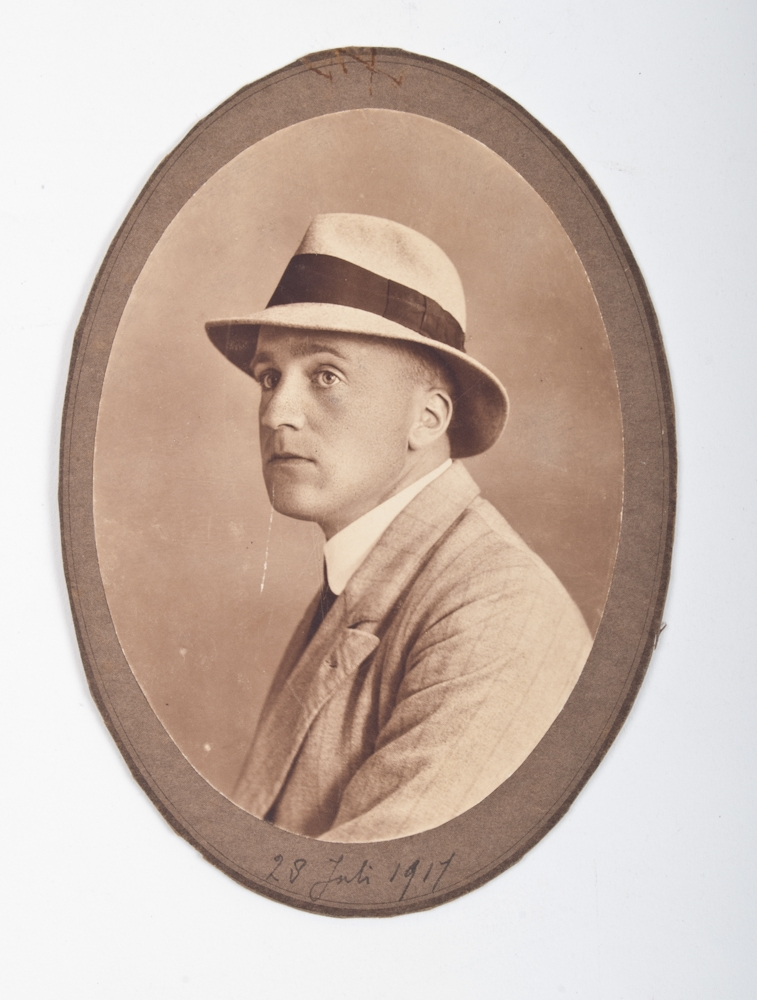
Grönloh in 1917

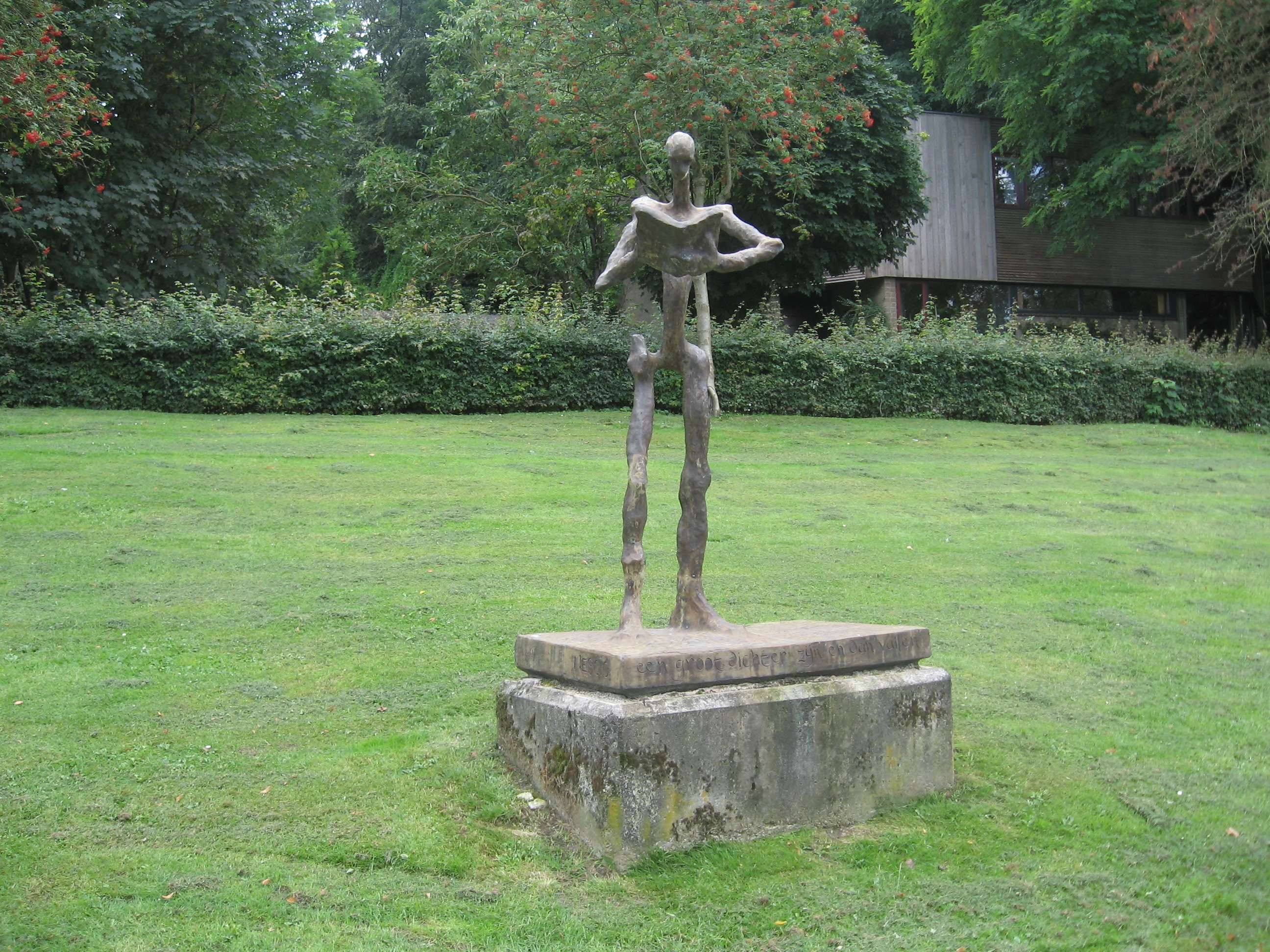
Statue of Nescio in Ubbergen (by Ronald Tolman

Jan Hendrik Frederik Grönloh (born 22 June 1882 in Amsterdam; died 25 July 1961 in Hilversum), known by his pen name of Nescio (Latin for "I don't know"), was a Dutch writer. Grönloh was a businessman by profession, but as Nescio he is mainly remembered for the three novellas De uitvreter (The Freeloader), Titaantjes (Little Titans), and Dichtertje (Little Poet). His reputation as an important Dutch writer was established only after his death.

== Biography ==
Nescio was born at Reguliersbreestraat 49 in Amsterdam, the eldest son of Jan Hendrik Frederik Grönloh, blacksmith and shopowner, with whom he shared his full name, and Martha Maria van der Reijden. Nescio grew up as Frits Grönloh, to distinguish him from his father. He was a third cousin once removed of Dutch singer Anneke Grönloh.

He was educated at a secular primary school, after which he went to the three-year HBS high school. From 1897 to 1899 he went to the Openbare Handelsschool (a college level business school). After this he started work as an office clerk in Hengelo, but quickly returned to Amsterdam, where he held a succession of similar jobs. In 1905 Nescio married Aagje Tiket, with whom he would raise four daughters. Until his death in a Hilversum sanatorium in 1961, Nescio would remain in Amsterdam.

Frits Grönloh started writing as Nescio, as he wanted to keep his professional career and his writing career separate. All his stories bear witness to the conflict between his career and his ideals, as formed by utopian socialism. In 1900 he had started a commune inspired by Frederik van Eeden's Walden commune; the commune was wound up in 1903. He still kept his ideals but was no longer personally involved.

Instead he turned to writing, as well as long solitary walks in the countryside around Amsterdam. He was not very prolific, much of his writing remained unpublished until after his death, and the stories he did publish went out of print quickly. His decision to use a pseudonym does not help with this: it was only in 1932 that Nescio revealed his true name. This led to a reprint of De uitvreter/Titaantjes/Dichtertje in 1933, as well as some critical attention.

It was only after World War II that he became reasonably well known, though his oeuvre is still small, roughly 160 pages. However, growing critical appreciation led to him receiving the Marianne Philips Prize in 1954, as well as the publication of a new collection of stories just before his death in 1961.

His name lives on in the form of the Nesciobrug which enables cyclists and pedestrians to go from Diemen to IJburg over the Amsterdam-Rhine Canal.

== Works by Nescio ==
Nescio was not a prolific writer, and it did not help that none of his stories had any success at publication. His reputation as an important Dutch writer therefore rests solely on three short stories, De uitvreter (1911), Titaantjes (1915) and Dichtertje (1918).

=== De uitvreter ===
De uitvreter (The Freeloader) was first published in the Dutch literary magazine De Gids. The central character is Japi, who wants to be the perfect bohemian, but does not want to do anything with his life but just sit and look at the sea. He is a friend of Koekebakker, the narrator, who thinks that Japi is, "apart from the man who thought the Sarphatistraat in Amsterdam was the most beautiful place in Europe, the strangest person he had known". He is also friends with an unsuccessful painter, Bavink, who like Koekebakker would return in Titaantjes. Japi sponges off both Koekebakker and Bavink, as well as other friends, but they do not mind greatly, as he is such an innocent.

The theme of the story is how ideals conflict with the demands of society, which Japi resolves by quietly committing suicide at the end of the book (by stepping from the Nijmegen railway bridge), when it is no longer possible for him to keep pursuing his ideal of doing absolutely nothing. Bavink as an unsuccessful painter is the best at not conforming, while the narrator is slowly seduced by material comforts.

=== Titaantjes ===
Titaantjes (Little Titans) was first published in Groot-Nederland. It is a semi-sequel to De uitvreter and again features Koekebakker as narrator, reminiscing about his time with Bavink, and the newly introduced characters of Hoyer, Bekker, and Kees, when he still had ideals. The opening sentence is "Boys we were – but nice boys". The story then leaps ahead several years. Koekebakker is now a successful journalist, while each of the others has failed their ideals in one way or another. Bekker has given up on changing the world, and works in an office again. Kees has a blue-collar job. Hoyer is a mid-range official in the SDAP. The most ardent adherent to their youthful ideals, Bavink, went mad after being unable to create the masterpiece he had striven after for so long.

=== Dichtertje ===
Dichtertje (Little Poet) was published in one volume with De uitvreter and Titaantjes in a printrun of 500 copies by the art dealer J.H. de Bois. It is the story of an idealistic poet, which, unlike the other two stories, is told by Nescio himself. It is slightly daring in its frank discussion of sexual mores and adultery for the time in which it was written, as well as having the "God of the Netherlands" on stage.

The theme of the story is again the conflict between idealistic youth and bourgeois adulthood, with the main character both mourning the loss of his ideals and accepting his fate as a bourgeois family man.

=== Other works ===
- Mene tekel (1946, often published together with De uitvreter/Titaantjes/Dichtertje), the title taken from the biblical episode of Belshazzar's feast.
- Boven het Dal en andere verhalen (Above the Valley and Other Stories, 1961, a selection of unpublished work, which appeared shortly before his death)
- De X Geboden (The X Commandments, 1971, posthumously published)
- Nescio, Brieven uit Veere, 2010

=== Translations ===
An English translation of most of Nescio's stories was published in 2012 under the title Amsterdam Stories.

== See also ==
- NRC's Best Dutch novels
