= Meester Kikker =

2016 film

- Theatrical release poster
- Directed by: Anna van der Heide
- Screenplay by: Mieke de Jong
- Based on: Meester Kikker by Paul van Loon
- Produced by: Burny Bos
- Starring: Jeroen Spitzenberger; Georgina Verbaan; Paul R. Kooij
- Cinematography: Mark van Aller
- Edited by: Michiel Reichwein
- Music by: Fons Merkies
- Production companies: Bos Bros. Film & TV Productions; AVROTROS
- Distributed by: Dutch FilmWorks
- Release dates: 16 July 2016 (Netherlands); 26 August 2016 (Slovenia)
- Running time: 85 minutes
- Countries: Netherlands; Belgium
- Language: Dutch
- Box office: $927,530

Meester Kikker is a 2016 Dutch-Belgian family film directed by Anna van der Heide. It was based on the book of the same name by Paul van Loon. It was listed as one of eleven films that could be selected as the Dutch submission for the Best Foreign Language Film at the 89th Academy Awards, but it was not nominated.

== Cast ==
- Jeroen Spitzenberger as Meester Frans / Meester Kikker
- Georgina Verbaan as Ceciel
- Yenthe Bos as Sita
- Paul R. Kooij as Directeur Stork
