= Dada-Review =

1919 collage by Hannah Höch

Coordinates: 52.5042°N 13.3989°E

- Dada-Rundschau (German)
- Artist: Hannah Höch
- Year: 1919
- Type: collage
- Dimensions: 43.7 cm × 34.6 cm (17.2 in × 13.6 in)
- Location: Berlinische Galerie; Berlin

Dada - Review (German: Dada-Rundschau) is a photomontage created by the German artist Hannah Höch in 1919.

== Description ==
The work measures 43.7 × 34.6 cm and is in the collection of the Berlinische Galerie in Berlin, Germany.

== Analysis ==
In 1919, Hannah Höch began to use photomontage technique in Dada. Despite her traditional artistic education, she continued until the end of life to create her works using a collage technique that combined clippings of print media. In Dada - review, different fragments of text and images depict a grotesque political kaleidoscope.

The collage is a sectional view of the period after World War I. It is possible to recognize faces of German President Friedrich Ebert in a swimsuit and US President Woodrow Wilson as an angel of peace. There is ridicule, changing perspectives and proportions, and between them words and letters. Höch is the only female Berlin Dadaist who used photomontage to parody "giant global absurdities" using photos, headlines and advertisements from magazines.
