= Marianne Philips =

Dutch writer and politician (1886–1951)

- Born: 18 March 1886; Amsterdam, Netherlands
- Died: 13 May 1951 (aged 65); Naarden, Netherlands
- Other name: M. Goudeket-Philips
- Occupations: Writer and politician
- Notable work: De biecht (1930); De zaak Beukenoot (1950)

Marianne Philips (18 March 1886 – 13 May 1951) was a Dutch writer and politician. In 1919, she became one of the first female municipal council members of the Netherlands. Philips wrote psychological novels. Philips survived World War II by going into hiding. In 1950, De zaak Beukenoot was selected as the gift for Boekenweek, a week dedicated to Dutch literature.

== Biography ==
Philips was born on 18 March 1886 in an affluent Jewish family who lived on Kloveniersburgwal in Amsterdam. Her father died when she was 1½ years old. Her mother remarried, however the business started to fail. When Philips was 14, her mother died, and she had to leave school to work in a sewing workshop. The family drifted into poverty and ended up in a little house in Watergraafsmeer near the railway line.

Philips became a member of the Social Democratic Workers' Party. In 1907, she found employment at Royal Asscher Diamond Company, and in 1911 married Sam Goudeket. The couple settled in Bussum, and in 1919, she was elected to the municipal council of Bussum as one of the first women councillors. Philips had to leave the council after her third child, but would call herself the first councillor to bear a child in the Netherlands.

In 1929, Philips made her début with De wonderbare genezing. In 1930, Philips published De biecht about a girl from a humble background who managed to work herself up only to end up in a deep psychological crisis. The novel received critical acclaim for its psychological depth. In 1934, she published Bruiloft in Europa (1934), a novel set in Vienna during World War I. The novel would become an international bestseller.

During World War II, the family received a letter that they had to report at Herzogenbusch concentration camp. They decided to go into hiding. Philips would remain vague about her experiences during the war, and never discussed it in her novels. It is known that she had to move at least ten times. During the war, she developed arthritis, and had to be hospitalised. She would celebrate liberation and be reunited with her husband in hospital.

In 1950, Philips wrote De zaak Beukenoot, a novel about class justice in the Netherlands. The novel was selected as the gift for Boekenweek. Philips died on 13 May 1951 in Naarden at the age of 65.

== Marianne Philips Prize ==
In 1951, Sam Goudeket, her husband, initiated the Marianne Philips Prize. The Prize was awarded annually for authors who are still active past the age of 50, but no longer achieve attention. The prize was awarded from 1951 until 1975.

== Works ==
- Bruiloft in Europa, Bussum : Dishoeck, 1936
- Hochzeit in Europa; aus dem Holländischen übertragen von Hanna Waldeck, Locarno : Verbano Verlag, 1935
- De biecht, Houten : Agathon, 1986, ISBN 90-269-5076-4
- Die Beichte einer Nacht : Roman , aus dem Niederländischen von Eva Schweikart; mit einem Nachwort von Judith Belinfante, Zürich : Diogenes, 2021, ISBN 978-3-257-07142-9
