= Boekenweek =

Dutch event dedicated to Dutch literature

In the Netherlands, the Boekenweek (Dutch pronunciation: [ˈbukə(ɱ)ˌʋeːk]; English: Book Week) is an annual "week" of ten days dedicated to Dutch literature. It has been held in March annually since 1932. Each Boekenweek has a theme. The beginning of the Boekenweek is marked by the Boekenbal (book ball), a gathering that is attended by writers and publishers. Events are held across the country during the Boekenweek, such as book signing sessions, literary festivals and debates.

== Publications ==
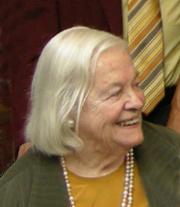
Hella Haasse, the only author who has written the Boekenweekgeschenk thrice, in 1948, 1959 and 1994.

Each year a well-known writer, usually Dutch or Flemish, is asked to write a book, usually a novella, called the Boekenweekgeschenk (book week gift), which is to be given away during the festival. Book shops give a copy of the Boekenweekgeschenk when a customer buys a book in the Dutch language; libraries also give copies of these books when a new person becomes a member. The Boekenweekgeschenk is published by the Collectieve Propaganda van het Nederlandse Boek (CPNB, Collective Promotion for the Dutch Book). Some authors invited to write for this event have included Maarten 't Hart (1984), Hugo Claus (1989), Cees Nooteboom, and Harry Mulisch (2000). In 2001, the Boekenweekgeschenk was originally written in English by Salman Rushdie and later translated into Dutch.

In the 1940s, 1950s, and 1960s, the Boekenweekgeschenk was sometimes published anonymously, with a list of possible authors inside the book. As a competition, readers could submit their guess by postcard as to who the author was. Since 2002, the Boekenweekgeschenk can be used as a ticket to travel for free by train with the Nederlandse Spoorwegen on the final Sunday of the Boekenweek.

Since 1987, an essay, the Boekenweekessay, has been written in addition to the Boekenweekgeschenk. The Boekenweekessay can be purchased in book shops. Some authors include Jan Wolkers (1995), Gerrit Komrij (1997) and Adriaan van Dis (2004).

The curriculum vitae of the author of the Boekenweekgeschenk – called the Boekenweek-cv – is distributed by public libraries among their members.

== History ==
On 15 November 1930, the Dag van het Boek (Day of the Book) was held to protect books from new media, such as radio and cinema. The book De uitgever en zijn bedrijf by Johan Tersteeg was published to celebrate the 50th anniversary of the Nederlandsche Uitgeversbond. Publishers, booksellers and others interested in supporting books organized a longer event to promote Dutch literature.

In 1932, the first Boekenweek was held and the first Boekenweekgeschenk was published. During World War II, the Boekenweek was not held in the years 1942 till 1945. In 1941, a Boekenweekgeschenk was published but it was withdrawn from the stores due to German occupation of the country.

Despite competition from other media, including new technology since 1932, the Boekenweekgeschenk has grown in popularity over the years. In 2010, during the 75th Boekenweek, 958,000 copies of the Boekenweekgeschenk were produced.

== Boekenbal ==
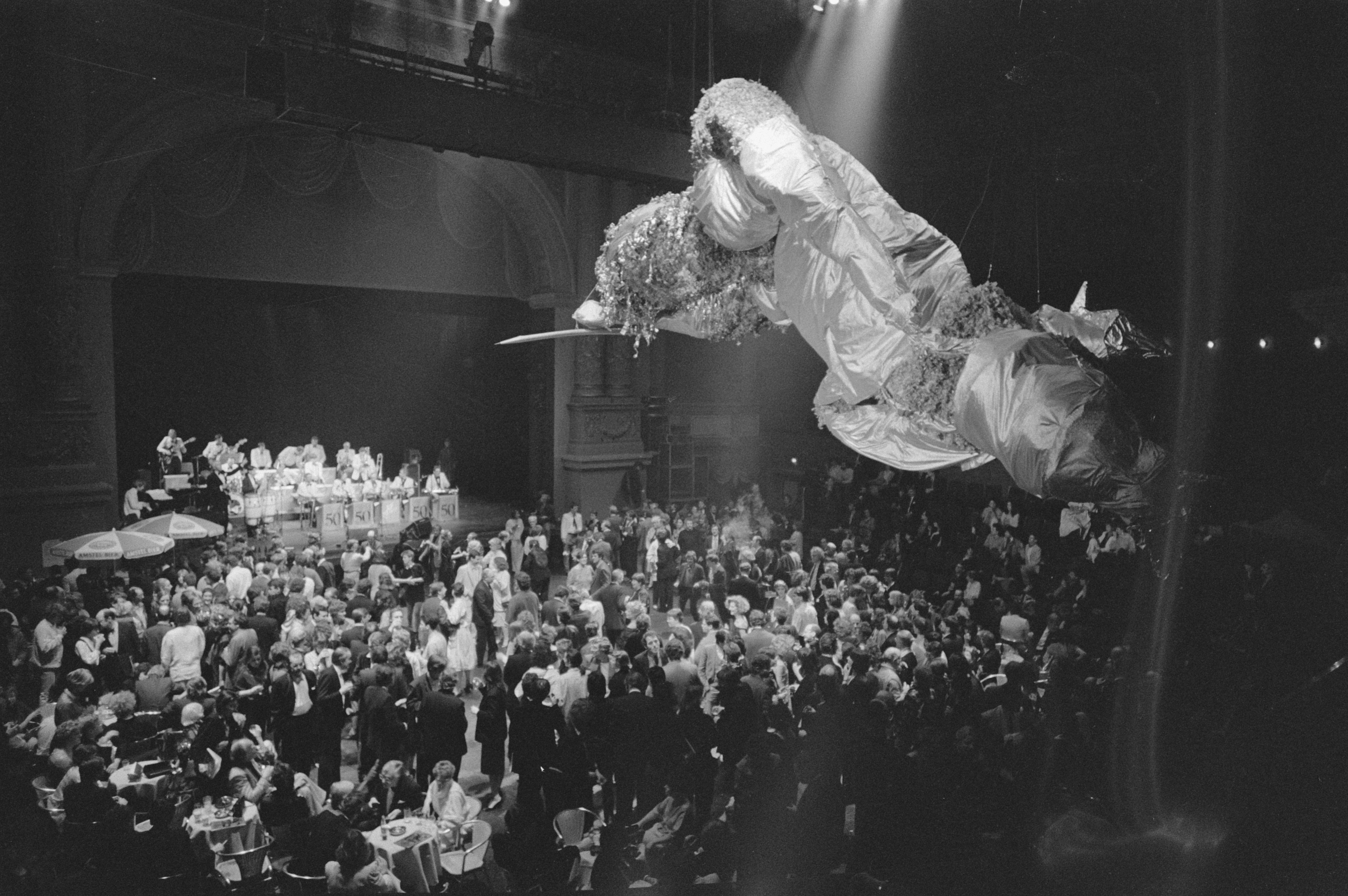
Boekenbal in Carré in 1985

First held in 1947, the Boekenbal (book ball) is an invitation-only event, with the Collectieve Propaganda van het Nederlandse Boek (CPNB) deciding the guest list. It is traditionally held in the Stadsschouwburg in Amsterdam. The invitation policy of CPNB has sparked some controversy, and another group has organized the independent event called the Bal der Geweigerden (Ball of the Refused). It was first held in 2002 in Paradiso, which is nearby the location of the official Boekenbal, and it can be attended by anyone.

== Kinderboekenweek ==
Since 1955, a book week for children has been held, called the Kinderboekenweek. It is held in October and it also lasts ten days. It opens with a social gathering, called the Kinderboekenbal. Similar to the Boekenweek, a Kinderboekenweekgeschenk is written and published to be given away by book shops to clients purchasing literature for children. Some of the authors include Paul Biegel (1977), Annie M.G. Schmidt (1990) and Thea Beckman (1991). Since 1986, a picture book is published for toddlers.
