= Vlag en Wimpel =

Dutch literary award

In the Netherlands, the Vlag en Wimpel award is an honourable mention awarded by either the jury of the Gouden Griffel and Zilveren Griffel awards (for Dutch-language children's literature) or the jury of the Gouden Penseel and Zilveren Penseel awards (for illustrations in children's literature). The award is organised by the Collectieve Propaganda van het Nederlandse Boek. Starting in 2022, instead of Flags and Pennants, Bronze Griffels and Bronze Brushes will be awarded. The name change is intended to underscore the purpose of these awards: to highlight the best children's books.

== Writing ==
The Vlag en Wimpel award can be given by the jury of the Gouden Griffel and Zilveren Griffel awards.

=== 1980 ===
- Lloyd Alexander, De straatkatten en andere verhalen
- Henk Barnard, Laatste nacht in Jeque
- Gunilla Bergström, Eens gestolen altijd een dief
- Christina Björk and Lena Anderson, Ik houd van planten
- Miep Diekmann, Stappe stappe step
- Anne Fine, Een vreemde vogel in het tuinhuis
- Herbert Friedrich, Zeven jaren van een wielrenner
- Peter van Gestel, Schuilen onder je schooltas
- Ota Hofman, De rode schuur
- Diet Huber, De veter-eter
- Janosch, De muis heeft rode sokken aan
- Yasuko Kimura, Wat zit er in die fles?
- Leonie Kooiker, Het Oerlanderboek
- Guus Kuijer, Een hoofd vol macaroni
- Liesbeth van Lennep, Hoe gaat het met jou? Met mij gaat het goed
- Carl-Anders Norrlid, Een wolf in de stal
- Gudrun Pausewang, En straks komt Emilio
- K.M. Peyton, Maak een vuist als je geen hand hebt
- Mario Puzo, Na elke bocht ontdek je wat
- Ernest Raboff, Kunst voor jou (Chagall, Renoir, Picasso)
- Simone Schell and Thé Tjong-Khing, Hier woon ik
- Midred D. Taylor, Donderslagen, hoor mijn klacht
- Oscar Wilde, De zelfzuchtige reus

=== 1981 ===
- Leif Esper Andersen, Mijn vader is werkloos
- Nina Bawden, Carry´s kleine oorlog
- Thea Beckman, Wij zijn wegwerpkinderen
- Burny Bos and Dagmar Stam, Knofje waar zit je
- Mies Bouhuys and others, Wijs met de waddenzee
- Gerard Brands, Een krekel voor de keizer
- Helma Fehrmann and Peter Weismann, Vlinders in je buik
- Corrie Hafkamp, Wat dacht je van mij
- Janosch, Vooruit, we gaan schatgraven
- Nannie Kuiper, Zo kan het ook
- Guus Kuijer, De tranen knallen uit mijn kop
- Frick Lennart, De vergissing
- Mildred Myrick, Wat heb je daar
- K.M. Peyton, Jonathan wat zag je in die zomernacht
- Käthe Recheis, De vlucht van Nataiyu
- An Rutgers van der Loeff, Morgen is de toekomst
- Alet Schouten, Het erf van Roos en Lap
- Craig Strete, Grootvaders reisdoel
- Kerstin Thorvall, In plaats van een vader
- Adela Turin and Anna Curti, Het lapjesjasje
- Henri Van Daele, Pitjemoer
- Liva Willems and Huis Pieters, De haan wil een ei

=== 1982 ===
- Christina Björk and Lena Anderson, Ik houd van eten
- Laura Conti, Er hangt iets in de lucht
- Philippe Dumas, Waar kom je vandaan?
- Karel Eykman and Peter van Straaten, Liefdewerk, oud papier
- Renato Ferraro, Alex de jonge jongleur
- Peter van Gestel and Peter van Straaten, Joost; of, De domme avonturen van een slim jongetje
- Felice Holman, Morgen wordt het beter
- Hugh Lewin and Lisa Kopper, Jafta (entire series)
- Arnold Lobel, Fabels
- Arnold Lobel, Kikker en Pad zijn altijd samen
- Arnold Lobel, Muizensoep
- Norma Fox Mazer, Mevrouw Vis; aap en de vuilniskoningin
- Norma Fox Mazer, Praatjes vullen geen gaatjes
- Jan Ormerod, Goeiemorgen
- Ferdinand Oyono, De huisjongen
- Helen Oxenbury, Babyboekjes. 5 dln.
- Margret Rettich, De reis met de jol
- Alet Schouten and Lidia Postma, De vier wezen
- Jenny Thorne, De reis van Prins Foedji
- Dolf Verroen and Thé Tjong-Khing, Juf is gek
- Ida Vos, Wie niet weg is wordt gezien

=== 1983 ===
- Bernard Ashley, Rad van avontuur
- Malcolm Bosse, Ze noemen me Ganesh
- Victor Canning, De weglopers
- Robert Cormier, Chocolade oorlog
- Robert Cumming, Kijken en fantaseren
- Colin Dann, De dieren van het duitenbos
- Karel Eykman, Wie verliefd is gaat voor
- Hadley Irwin, Twtti Rhys Hec
- Henk van Kerkwijk, Dondergoden en pestkoppen
- E.L. Konigsburg, Het wonderlijke archief van mevrouw Fitzalan
- Tomie dePaola, Voetje voor voetje
- Susan Sallis, Zolang het nog kan
- Ivan Southall, De wervelstorm
- Gabrielle Vincent, Brammert en Tissie. 2 dln.

=== 1984 ===
- Nina Bawden, Ons vertellen ze nooit iets
- Malcolm Bosse, De tuin van je leven
- Hans Dorrestijn, De bloeddorstige badmeester
- Willi Fährmann, Vlucht tussen hoop en wanhoop
- Evert van Ginkel, De onderkant van Nederland
- Shirley Hughes, Alfie geeft een hand
- Mansfield Kirby, Het geheim van Toet-Mu-Is III
- Irina Korschunow, Bel me nou, Sebastiaan
- Margaret Mahy, De jongen met de gele ogen
- Selma Noort, Een gedeelde Hamaca
- Svend Otto, Kinderen van de Jangtse
- Marilyn Sachs, Veronica Ganz
- Alet Schouten, Gina
- Renate Welsh, De lange weg van Johanna
- Barbara Willard, Een koude wind
- Willem Wilmink, Koen, maak je mijn schoen?

=== 1985 ===
- Betsy Byars, Een goudvis van tweeduizend pond
- Roald Dahl, De heksen
- Guus Kuijer, De zwarte stenen
- Liesbeth van Lennep, Ik heet Kim
- Noni Lichtveld, Anansi
- Arnold Lobel, Een jaar bij Kikker en Pad
- Ron Maris, Mijn eigen boek
- Piet Meeuwissen, Vogels in het zwart
- Christine Nöstlinger, Twee weken in mei
- Selma Noort, Martine Koperslager
- Helen Oxenbury, Bij opa en oma
- Fetze Pijlman, Voor het eerst
- Käthe Recheis, De Witte Wolf
- Ouida Sebestyen, De lege plaats
- Shel Silverstein, Licht op zolder
- Craig Strete, Met de pijn die het liefheeft en haat
- Susan Varley, Derk Das blijft altijd bij ons
- Barbara Willard, De ijzeren lelie
- Willem Wilmink, Het verkeerde pannetje

=== 1986 ===
- Peter Carter, Het zwaard van de Islam
- Aidan Chambers, Je moet dansen op mijn graf
- Miep Diekmann, Hannes en Kaatje, 2 in een straatje
- Werner l´Egli, Tot aan het bittere eind
- Karel Eykman, Het fort van Sjako
- Rudolf Frank, De jongen die zijn verjaardag vergat
- Ann O´Neal García, Mat-Maw
- Christoph Hein, Een indiaan in de appelboom
- Wim Hofman, Straf en andere verhalen
- Hadley Irwin, Athabasca
- Margaret Mahy, De grote zeerovers knalfuif
- Els Pelgrom, De Olifantsberg
- Rukshana Smith, Wie is Sumitra?
- Cynthia Voigt, Onder de blote hemel/ Samen onder dak

=== 1987 ===
- Roald Dahl, De Giraffe, de Peli en Ik
- Midas Dekkers, Je binnenste buiten
- Miep Diekmann, Hannes en kaatje en het rommellaatje
- Miep Diekmann, Hoe schilder hoe wilder
- Gerben Hellinga jr., Coriolis de stormplaneet
- Diet Huber, Rinske en de stoomtram
- Het Kookboek van het Kinderkookcafé
- Rindert Kromhout, Olaf de rover
- Guus Kuijer, De jonge prinsen
- Joke van Leeuwen, De vis en het boek
- Ted van Lieshout, Van verdriet kun je grappige hoedjes vouwen
- Hanna Muschg, De zevenslaper
- Els Pelgrom, De straat waar niets gebeurt
- William Steig, Geel & Roze
- Cynthia Voigt, Het verhaal van Dicey

=== 1988 ===
- Janet and Allan Ahlberg, Bot en Botje
- Christina Björk and Lena Anderson, Ik houd van de tuin van Monet
- Eric Dederen and Philippe Moins, Poppetje gezien? Kastje dicht!
- Peter Dickinson, De stad van goud
- Wim Hofman, Uk en Bur
- Wiel Kusters, Het veterdiploma
- Joke van Leeuwen, Het verhaal van Bobbel die in een bakfiets woonde en rijk wilde worden
- David MacKee, Het droevige verhaal van Victoria en haar viool; of waarom de straten niet vol zijn met vrolijk dansende mensen
- Pauline Mol, Verhalen van de zwarte kraai
- Michael Morpurgo, Waarom kwamen de walvissen?
- Rita Törnqvist, Achter de bergen ligt de zee
- Willem Wilmink, Goedenavond, speelman: Willem Wilmink´s schriftelijke cursus dichten
- Laurence Yep, De vleugels van de draak

=== 1989 ===
- Ienne Biemans, Lang zul je leven
- Gerard Brands, Bolletje
- Corinne Courtalon, De schatten van de farao´s
- Roald Dahl, Matilda
- Peter van Gestel, Oef van de mensen
- Markus Kappeler, Het boek van de grote katten
- Jetty Krever, Kom gauw mol!
- Sjoerd Kuyper, Majesteit, Uw ontbijt
- Ted van Lieshout, De allerliefste jongen van de hele wereld
- David McDowall, De Palestijnen
- Catherine Storr, De jongen en de zwaan
- Henri Van Daele, Een huis met een poort en een park
- Akky van der Veer, Zwart op wit
- Max Velthuijs, Een taart voor kleine beer
- Dolf Verroen, De liefste poes van de wereld
- Martin Waddell, Welterusten kleine beer

=== 1990 ===
- Tonke Dragt, Het geheim van de klokkenmaker, of de tijd zal het leren
- Wim Hofman, Grote Pien en kleine Pien
- David MacKee, Elmer
- Jan Mark, Frats en Klater
- Jacques Musset, Het verhaal van de bijbel Nieuwe Testament
- Hiawyn Oram, Ben is boos
- Uri Orlev, De man van de andere kant
- Harriët van Reek, Het bergje spek
- Lydia Rood, Maanzaad
- Billi Rosen, De tweede oorlog
- Michael Rosen, Wij gaan op berejacht
- Gitte Spee, Meneer Big gaat naar de bliksem
- Ruth Thomas, De Weglopers
- Ida Vos, Dansen op de brug van Avignon

=== 1991 ===
- Burny Bos, Valentino de Kikker
- Anthony Browne, Anthony, Er gaat iets veranderen
- Xavier Hernandez and Pilar Comes, Geschiedenis van een stad bij de Middellandse Zee, Tarma
- Guus Kuijer, Olle
- Ted van Lieshout, Ik ben een held
- Laurence Mound, Insekten
- Beverley Naidoo, Keten van verzet
- Max Velthuijs, Trompet voor Olifant

=== 1992 ===
- Hans Hagen, Jubelientje en haar liefste oma
- Martin Waddell, Ga je mee, Kleine Beer?
- Kit Pearson, De hemel valt
- Toon Tellegen, Juffrouw Kachel
- Libby Hathorn, Donderslag
- Rudolf Herfurtner, Oorlogskind
- Henri Van Daele, De Appels aan de overkant
- Sylvie Girardet, Claire Merleau-Ponty, Anne Tardy and Fernando Puig Rosado, Aan apen verslingerd
- Lannoo / Bosch & Keuning, Encyclopedie voor de jeugd
- Lars Klinting, De kleine bomengids

=== 1993 ===
- Camilla Ashforth, Horatio
- Imme Dros, Een heel lief konijn
- Henri Van Daele, Kleine Beer, Grote Beer
- Bart Moeyaert, Voor altijd, altijd
- Mensje van Keulen, Meneer Ratti
- Joke van Leeuwen, Dit boek heet anders
- Patricia MacLachlan, Snippers
- Paula Fox, Vullisland
- Hans Hagen, De weg van de wind
- Hazel Rochman, Gespleten landschap
- Midas Dekkers, Op eigen pootjes
- Lars Klinting, De kleine insektengids
- Jacques Vos, Een leven met letters

=== 1994 ===
- Patsy Backx, Het verhaal van Stippie en Jan
- Ted van Lieshout, Toen oma weg was
- Ulf Stark, Kun je fluiten Johanna?
- Kit Pearson, Een handvol tijd
- Roberto Piumini, Matthijs en z´n opa
- Peter Pohl, We noemen hem Anna

=== 1995 ===
- Peter van Gestel, Prinses Roosje
- Peter van Gestel, Lieve Claire
- Hans Hagen, Maliff en de wolf
- John Marsden, Lieve Tracey... Lieve Mandy...
- Hushang Moradi-Kermani, Op een ochtend was de khomre leeg
- Roberto Piumini, Stralend kruid
- Rita Verschuur, Mijn hersens draaien rondjes

=== 1996 ===
- Kees Jan Bender and Hans Heesen, Camembert
- Janneke Derwig, W.C.-papier in de wind laten wapperen
- Chris Donner, Brieven van mijn broertje
- Imme Dros, Ongelukkig verliefd
- Rindert Kromhout, Rare vogels
- Johanna Kruit, Zoals de wind om het huis
- Ben Kuipers, De grote gevaren van Arno
- Selma Noort, Geen gewone ketting
- Babette van Ogtrop and Liesbet Ruben, Verhalen om niet te verdwalen
- Anton Quintana, Het boek van Bod Pa
- Max Velthuijs, Kikker is een held
- Cynthia Voigt, Met het mes op tafel

=== 1997 ===
- Kitty Crowther, Mijn vriend Jim
- Berry van Gerwen, Licht uit, Tim. Boek toe!
- Hakim Traïdia, De zandkroon
- Elke Heidenreich, Nero Corleone: een kattenverhaal
- Hilary McKay, Hond Vrijdag
- Jan Michael, Ik ben Joshua en mijn vader is een held
- Rafik Schami, Fatima en de dromendief
- Thomas Tidholm, Jacob maakt rommel

=== 1998 ===
- Klaas van Assen, De gekte van Mees Santing
- Helena Dahlbåck, De woorden gaan goed vandaag
- Jaak Dreesen, Marieke, Marieke
- Kamagurka, Bollekop
- Ditte Merle, IJsberen en andere draaikonten
- Laura Ranger, Laura´s gedichten
- Kazumi Yumoto, De kippige, de dikke en ik

=== 1999 ===
- Arno van Berge Henegouwen and Ruud Hisgen, De oervogel
- Rotraut Susanne Berner, Haas en hond
- Sylvia vanden Heede, Vos en haas
- Harm de Jonge, Jesse ´ballewal-tsjÍ´

=== 2000 ===
- Daniil Charms, Een stinkdier is een prachtig beest
- Marie Delafon, De goeie broek
- Wim Köhler, De medicijnman
- Ditte Merle, Het boerenbeestenboek
- Mirjam Oldenhave, Donna Lisa
- Daan Remmerts de Vries, Willis

=== 2001 ===
- Carli Biessels, Feestrede
- J. Hohler, Als ik een wens mocht doen
- Agave Kruijssen, Het vrouwtje van Stavoren
- Ben Kuipers, Boos in de doos
- Hermine Landvreugd, Willem is een weerwolf
- Bette Westera, Een opa om nooit te vergeten

=== 2002 ===
- Lida Dijkstra, Wachten op Apollo
- Bas Haring, Kaas en de evolutietheorie
- Harm de Jonge, De circusfietser
- Tjibbe Veldkamp, De lievelingstrui

=== 2003 ===
- Geert De Kockere, Noach
- Koos Meinderts, Keizer en de verhalenvader
- Bette Westera, Alle hens aan dek

=== 2004 ===
- Jaak Dreesen, Het concert
- Ed Franck, Zie ik je nog eens terug?
- Mireille Geus, Virenzo en ik
- Ben Kuipers, Het schrift van Dries
- Peter H. Reynolds, De stip
- Jan Paul Schutten, Ruik eens wat ik zeg
- Annejoke Smids, Piratenbloed
- Edward van de Vendel, Rood Rood Roodkapje
- Rik Zaal, Alles over Spanje

=== 2005 ===
- Michael Rosen, Verdriet
- Lieneke Dijkzeul, Aan de bal
- Riet Wille, Saar en de poes
- An van ´t Oosten, De oorlog van Sophie

=== 2006 ===
- Bette Westera, Oma´s rommelkamer
- Saskia van der Wiel, Dertig dagen Laura
- Andreas Steinhöfel, Midden in de winternacht
- Hilde Vandermeeren, Het kistje van Cleo
- Dirk Weber, Kies mij!
- Jet Bakels en Anne-Marie Boer, Menseneters

=== 2007 ===
- Carl Norac, O monster, eet me niet op!
- Carli Biessels, Irah en de dieren
- Martha Heesen, Wolf
- Rob Ruggenberg, Het verraad van Waterdunen
- Harm de Jonge, Josja Pruis
- Tjibbe Veldkamp, SMS
- Piet Duizer, Het grote vlinderboek

=== 2008 ===
- Mireille Geus, Naar Wolf
- Truus Matti, Vertrektijd
- Janny van der Molen, Over engelen, goden en helden
- Gideon Samson, Niks zeggen!
- Edward van de Vendel, Kleinvader

=== 2009 ===
- Koen van Biessen, Mama Lucinda
- Ulrich Hub, Om acht uur bij de Ark
- Christopher Grey, De schaduw van Leonardo
- Daan Remmerts de Vries, Bernie King en de magische cirkels
- Tanneke Wigersma, Ole durft

=== 2010 ===
- Nadine Brun-Cosme, Grote Wolf & Kleine Wolf
- Sharon Creech, Haat die kat
- Diverse auteurs, Tijger op straat
- Christian Duda, Al zijn eendjes
- Christopher Paul Curtis, Elia strijdt voor vrijheid
- Sylvia Vanden Heede, Wolf en Hond
- Margriet Heymans, Op zoek naar opa Bleskop
- Rindert Kromhout, Kleine Ezel en de durfal
- Agnès de Lestrade, Het land van de grote woordfabriek
- Ted van Lieshout, Ik wil een naam van chocola
- Chris Priestley, De verschrikkelijke verhalen van het zwarte schip
- Shaun Tan, Verhalen uit een verre voorstad
- Edward van de Vendel, Ajax wint altijd

=== 2011 ===
- Ceciel de Bie, Inkt
- Michael de Cock, Rosie en Moussa
- Siobhan Dowd, Het reuzenradmysterie
- Joke van Leeuwen, Tikken tegen de maan
- Joke van Leeuwen, Toen mijn vader een struik werd
- Tine Mortier, Angèle de Verschrikkelijke
- Mirjam Oldenhave, Mees Kees - De Sponsorloop
- Maria Parr, Tonje en de geheime brief
- Gustavo Roldán, Meneer G.
- Edward van de Vendel, Draken met stekkers
- Kaat Vrancken, Beu

=== 2012 ===
- Jenny Valentine, Iggy en ik
- Nadia Shireen, Lieve kleine Rolf
- Joke van Leeuwen, Waarom lig jij in mijn bedje?
- Mathilde Stein, Beste Bregje Boentjes
- Mirjam Oldenhave, Mees Kees gaat verhuizen
- Marjolijn Hof, Mijn opa en ik en het varken oma
- Rob Ruggenberg, IJsbarbaar
- Jowi Schmitz, Ik heet Olivia en daar kan ik ook niks aan doen
- Lida Dijkstra, Verhalen voor de vossenbroertjes
- Jan Paul Schutten, Groeten uit 2030!
- Ted van Lieshout, Vijf draken verslagen
- Various authors, Zoen me tot ik spin

=== 2013 ===
- Ienne Biemans and Ceseli Josephus Jitta, Waar was Hans?
- Koen Van Biesen, Buurman leest een boek
- Cornelia Funke, Ridder zonder hart
- Hans Hagen and Philip Hopman, Het hanengevecht
- Marco Kunst, De sleuteldrager
- Jaap Robben and Benjamin Leroy, Als iemand ooit mijn botjes vindt
- Hilde Vandermeeren and Harmen van Straaten, Camping Zeevos
- Bette Westera and Sylvia Weve, Aan de kant, ik ben je oma niet!
- Bette Westera, Naomi Tieman and Sylvia Weve, Dat zou ik nooit doen!
- Suzanne Wouda, Verschoppelingen

=== 2014 ===
- Joukje Akveld and Annemarie Terhell, ABC Dragt
- Komako Sakai, Als iedereen slaapt
- Ted van Lieshout, illustrated by Philip Hopman, Boer Boris in de sneeuw
- Marije van der Hoeven, Foto! Durf bijzondere foto´s te maken
- Edward van de Vendel, illustrated by Wolf Erlbruch, Ik juich voor jou
- Harm de Jonge, illustrated by Martijn van der Linden, Jonas en de visjes van Kees Poon
- Ellen van Velzen, Jonge Vlieger
- Anna Woltz, Mijn bijzonder rare week met Tess
- Mathilde Stein, Prinses Pernilla en de reddende ridders
- Marjolijn Hof, De regels van drie
- Enne Koens, illustrated by Kees de Boer, Sammie en opa
- Marco Kunst, illustrated by Philip Hopman, Vlieg!

=== 2015 ===
- Sjoerd Kuyper, illustrated by Sanne te Loo, De duik
- Michelle Robinson, illustrated by Kate Hindley, Hoe je een wollige mammoet moet wassen in tien lessen
- Sylvia Vanden Heede and Inge Bergh, illustrated by Marije Tolman, Hond weet alles en Wolf niets
- David Almond, illustrated by Oliver Jeffers, De jongen die met piranha´s zwom
- Bette Westera, illustrated by Thé Tjong-Khing, Kietel nooit een krokodil
- Rebecca Stevens, Valentine Joe
- Gerda Dendooven, De wondertuin

=== 2016 ===
- Mac Barnett, illustrated by Jon Klassen, Bas & Daan graven een gat
- Pieter Koolwijk, illustrated by Linde Faas, Bens boot
- Jenni Desmond, De blauwe vinvis
- B. J. Novak, Het boek zonder tekeningen
- Bette Westera, illustrated by Klaas Verplancke, In een slootje ben ik een bootje
- Marieke Smithuis, illustrated by Annet Schaap, Lotte & Roos. Samen ben je niet alleen
- Marc ter Horst, Van oerknal tot robot, alles heeft een begin
- Simon van der Geest, Spijkerzwijgen
- Jessie Hartland, Steve Jobs. Waanzinnig goed
- Derk Visser, Suikerspin
- Jennifer L. Holm, De veertiende goudvis
- Guido van Genechten, Wat zou jij doen?
- Selma Noort, illustrated by Martijn van der Linden, De zee kwam door de brievenbus

=== 2017 ===
- Gideon Samson, Eilanddagen
- Edward van de Vendel, illustrated by Floor de Goede, Ik ben bij de dinosaurussen geweest
- Anke Kranendonk, Lynn 3.0
- Elle van Lieshout and Erik van Os, illustrated by Marije Tolman, Niets liever dan jij
- Marc ter Horst, illustrated by Eliane Gerrits, De oma van de oma van mijn oma
- Eoin Colfer, Een vriendje voor altijd
- Susie Hodge, illustrated by Claire Goble, Waarom zijn er zoveel blote mensen in de kunst?
- Hans Hagen, illustrated by Martijn van der Linden, Yuna´s maan

=== 2018 ===
- Gideon Samson, illustrated by Annemarie van Haeringen, Alle dieren drijven
- Elena Favilli and Francesca Cavallo, Bedtijd voor rebelse meisjes
- Daan Remmerts de Vries, illustrated by Floor Rieder, De cycloop
- Bette Westera, Koos Meinderts, Sjoerd Kuyper, Hans Hagen, Monique Hagen, illustrated by Mies van Hout, Dag poes!
- Niki Padidar, Dokter Corrie geeft antwoord
- Lucy Strange, Het geheim van het Nachtegaalbos
- Leslie Connor, De gevangenisfamilie van Perry T. Cook
- Lisa Thompson, De goudvisjongen
- Bibi Dumon Tak, Het heel grote vogelboek
- Jef Aerts, illustrated by Sanne te Loo, Kersenhemel
- Stefan Boonen, illustrated by Jan van Lierde, Verliefd
- Marc ter Horst, De wortels van Oranje
- Anna Woltz, illustrated by Annet Schaap, Zondag maandag sterrendag

=== 2019 ===
- Mark Haayema, Johannes de parkiet
- Hadi Mohammadi, Het meisje en haar zeven paarden
- Louise Greig, Woesssj!
- Janneke Schotveld, De kikkerbilletjes van de koning
- Koos Meinderts, De schelmenstreken van Reinaert de Vos
- Ulf Stark, Liefde is niet voor lafaards
- Marjolijn Hof, Lepelsnijder
- Davide Morosinotto, Het mysterieuze horloge van Walker & Dawn
- Jessica Townsend, Nevermoor 1 - Morrigan Crow en het Wondergenootschap
- Mark Lowery, Charlie en ik
- Katherine Marsh, Niemandsjongen
- Marloes Morshuis, De schaduwen van Radovar
- Marc ter Horst, Palmen op de Noordpool
- Arend van Dam, De bromvliegzwaan en andere verhalen over onze taal
- Floor Bal, Het hele soepzootje
- Kees Spiering, Jij begint
- Hans Hagen, Onbreekbaar

== Illustrations ==
The Vlag en Wimpel award can be given by the jury the Gouden Penseel and Zilveren Penseel awards.

=== 1980 ===
- Bert Bouman and Karel Eykman, Het verhaal van Johannes en wat hij zag in zijn dromen
- Mance Post, Ik woonde in een leunstoel

=== 1981 ===
- John Burningham, De boodschappenmand
- Etienne Delessert, Ontmoeting met de natuur
- Michael Foreman, De tijger die zijn strepen kwijt was
- Lio Fromm, Achter de witte bergen
- Tatjana Hauptmann, Een dag uit het leven van Ringelore Krul
- Annemie Heymans, De kleine wereldreis van Bas en Joke
- Janosch, Vooruit, we gaan schatgraven
- Jef Koning, Brutus de muizenvanger
- Arnold Lobel, Bij uil thuis
- Ingrid Schubert and Dieter Schubert, Er ligt een krokodil onder mijn bed!
- Thé Tjong-Khing, Een krekel voor de keizer
- Fiep Westendorp, Otje

=== 1982 ===
- Jean Dulieu, Paulus en de insekten
- Philippe Dumas, Waar kom je vandaan?
- Russell Hoban and Quentin Blake, Restaurant de Twintig Olifanten
- Helen Oxenbury, Babyboekjes. 5 dln.
- Michael Rosen and Quentin Blake, Pak me dan als je kan
- Ingrid Schubert and Dieter Schubert, Helemaal verkikkerd
- Maurice Sendak, In de nachtkeuken
- Peter Spier, Mensen, mensen wat een mensen

=== 1983 ===
- Quentin Blake, Gruwelijke rijmen
- Jean Dulieu, Paulus en het beest van Ploemanàc
- Helme Heine, Dikke vrienden
- Annemie Heymans and Margriet Heymans, De gele draad
- Arnold Lobel, Oom olifant
- Dieter Schubert, Ravestreken
- Thé Tjong-Khing, De dieren van het Duitenbos
- Sylvia Weve, Wie verliefd is gaat voor

=== 1984 ===
- Jean Dulieu, Paulus en de toverhoed
- Helme Heine, Het allermooiste ei
- Theo Olthuis, Een hele grote badkuip vol
- Mance Post, Het geheim van Toet-Mu-Is III
- Lidia Postma, Klein Duimpje
- Ingrid Schubert and Dieter Schubert, Ik kan niet slapen

=== 1985 ===
- Quentin Blake, De heksen
- Raymond Briggs, De Verschrikkelijke Blikjes-Generaal en de Oude IJzeren Dame
- Arnold Lobel, Een jaar bij Kikker en Pad
- Tony Ross, Ik kom je opeten!
- Tony Ross, Towser en Sadie´s verjaardag
- Thé Tjong-Khing, Hoor je wat ik doe?
- Thé Tjong-Khing, Het Witte Herten Park

=== 1986 ===
- Rotraut Susanne Berner, Een indiaan in de appelboom
- Michael Foreman, Ik breng je naar Alie Modderman
- Janosch, De Kikkerkoning
- Arnold Lobel, Sprinkhaan op stap
- Gisela Neumann, Humbug
- Tony Ross, Towser en het gekke gezicht
- Joost Swarte, Niet zo, maar zo
- Max Velthuijs, De eend en de vos

=== 1987 ===
- Käthi Bhend, De Zevenslaper
- Quentin Blake, De Giraffe, de Peli en Ik
- Quentin Blake, De kluizenaar en de beer
- Harriët van Reek, De avonturen van Lena lena

=== 1988 ===
- Hans de Beer, Een ijsbeer in de tropen
- Posy Simmonds, Fred
- Gabrielle Vincent, Brammert en Tissie vieren Kerstmis

=== 1989 ===
- Anna Höglund, De Jaguar
- Joke van Leeuwen, We zijn allang begonnen, maar nu begint het echt
- Angela de Vrede, Eten is weten

=== 1990 ===
- Tony Ross, De schat van het blauwe huis
- Max Velthuijs, Kikker is verliefd
- Sylvia Weve, Lastige portretten

=== 1991 ===
- Gerard Berends, Waaien, hard waaien
- Geerten Ten Bosch, Verse bekken
- Harrie Geelen, Gijs en zijn hond Flop

=== 1992 ===
- Annemie Heymans, and Margriet Heymans, De prinses van de moestuin
- Anna Höglund, Eerst was er het donker
- Wim Hofman, In de stad

=== 1993 ===
- David MacKee, Zebra heeft de hik
- Tony Ross, De ridder die bang was in het donker
- Ralph Steadman, Quasi muis

=== 1994 ===
- Patsy Backx, Het verhaal van Stippie en Jan
- Lucy Cousins, Het huis
- Stephen Biesty, Slagschip

=== 1995 ===
- Annemarie van Haeringen, Op hoge poten
- Philip Hopman, Temmer Tom
- Marit Törnqvist, In Schemerland

=== 1996 ===
- Quentin Blake, Het clowntje
- Emma Chichester Clark, Kobus
- Jaap de Vries, De koning en de koningin

=== 1997 ===
- Wolf Erlbruch, Ik ruik kindervlees
- Daan Remmerts de Vries, Mijn tuin, mijn tuin

=== 1998 ===
- Gerda Dendooven, Nietes welles
- Johanna Kang, Sterren horen aan de hemel
- Sylvia Weve, Magische tekens

=== 1999 ===
- Rotraut Susanne Berner, De telduivel
- Marijke ten Cate, Altijd tijger
- Thé Tjong-Khing, Vos en haas

=== 2000 ===
- Norman Junge, Vijfde zijn
- Ceseli Josephus Jitta, Jan Jappie en de Veelvraat

=== 2001 ===
- Hans de Beer, Alexander de Grote
- Ian Falconer, Olivia
- Ingrid Godon, Wachten op Matroos

=== 2002 ===
- Jutta Brouwer, Opa en het geluk
- Bertand Dubois, De winkel van meneer Leopold
- Sieb Posthuma, Rintje

=== 2003 ===
- Goele Dewanckel, Ik verveel me nooit
- Klaas Verplancke, Djuk. Het kolenpaard van Fort Lapijn

=== 2004 ===
- Gerda Dendooven, Meneer Papier is verscheurd
- Sebastiaan Van Doninck, Het Woei
- Fleur van der Weel, Superguppie

=== 2005 ===
- Sieb Posthuma, Peter en de Wolf
- Rotraut Susanne Berner, Al mijn later is met jou
- Wolf Erlbruch, Waarom jij er bent

=== 2006 ===
- Natali Fortier, Waar ik van hou
- Yvonne Jagtenberg, Balotje en het paard
- Isabelle Vandenabeele, Mijn schaduw en ik

=== 2007 ===
- Ceseli Josephus Jitta, Lola en de leasekat
- Patrick McDonnell, Het allermooiste cadeau
- Sylvia Weve, Kip en ei

=== 2008 ===
- Wolf Erlbruch, De eend, de dood en de tulp
- Audrey Poussier, Mijn trui
- Marije Tolman, Mejuffrouw Muis en haar heerlijke huis

=== 2009 ===
- Sebastiaan van Doninck, Mijn eerste dierenopgroeiboek: kriebeldieren
- Nathalie Faber and Matthijs Immink, Binnendingen
- Piet Grobler, Ballade van de dood
- Shaun Tan, De aankomst
- Catharina Valckx, Otto spaart schelpen
- Fiel van der Veen, Tjibbe Tjabbes´ wereldreis

=== 2010 ===
- Philip Hopman, Voordat jij er was
- Sieb Posthuma, Aadje Piraatje
- Loes Riphagen, Huisbeestenboel

=== 2011 ===
- Various illustrators, Avonturen van Baron von Münchhausen
- Tjalling Houkema, De staart van meneer Kat
- Wendy Panders, Roodkapje was een toffe meid

=== 2012 ===
- Annemarie van Haeringen, Papa, hoor je me?
- Wouter van Reek, Keepvogel en Kijkvogel in het spoor van Mondriaan
- Mathilde Stein, Juffrouw van Zanten en de zeven rovers

=== 2013 ===
- Frédérique Bertrand, Meneertje Streepjespyjama in New York
- Koen Van Biesen, Buurman leest een boek
- Mies van Hout, Vriendjes

=== 2014 ===
- Imme Dros, Dit is Oele
- Henriëtte Boerendans, Nul is een raar getal
- Xavier Deneux, Van licht en donker: tegenstellingen

=== 2015 ===
- Sylvia Weve, Doodgewoon
- Cruschiform, In volle vaart
- Adrienne Barman, Vreemde vogels, bizarre beesten

=== 2016 ===
- Various illustrators, Avonturen van Odysseus
- Merlijne Marell, Schobbejacques en de 7 geiten
- Martijn van der Linden, written by Edward van de Vendel, Stem op de okapi

=== 2017 ===
- Kitty Crowther, Jan Toorop, het lied van de tijd
- Terry Fan, De tuinman van de nacht
- Yoko Heiligers, Wauw pauw

=== 2018 ===
- Enzo Pérès-Labourdette, written by Wouter Klootwijk, Anne, het paard en de rivier
- Arie van 't Riet, written by Jan Paul Schutten, Binnenstebinnen: röntgenfoto´s van dieren
- Mark Janssen, Dino´s bestaan niet
- Jon Klassen, written by Mac Barnett, Driehoek
- Joost Swarte, En toen De Stijl
- Øyvind Torseter, Kleine broer en de saxofoon, de olifant, de wolf en het paard
- Kitty Crowther, Kleine nachtverhalen
- Martijn van der Linden, written by Joukje Akveld, Van wie is die staart?
- Marije Tolman, written by Daan Remmerts de Vries, Voor papa
- Coralie Bickford-Smith, De vos en de ster
- Medy Oberendorff, written by Bart Rossel, Het wonderlijke insectenboek
