= Alice Hoogstad =

Dutch illustrator (born 1957)

- Born: 3 October 1957 (age 69); Rhoon, Netherlands
- Awards: Gouden Penseel (2015)

Alice Hoogstad (born 3 October 1957) is a Dutch illustrator of children's books. She also makes her own picture books. She received the Gouden Penseel in 2015 for her picture book Monsterboek.

== Life ==
Hoogstad was born in Rhoon. She is a daughter of the architect Jan Hoogstad. She grew up in Rhoon in a house full of books and surrounded by animals. At the Rotterdam Academie voor Beeldende Kunsten, later the Willem de Kooning Academy, she studied printmaking and painting. In 2023 she lived in Bergen.

== Work ==
Since 1986, (Note: According to De Schrijverscentrale, since 1987.) Hoogstad has mainly illustrated children's books. She has worked for publishers including Lemniscaat, Leopold and Querido, and has illustrated books by Guus Kuijer (including Polleke), Sjoerd Kuyper and Tjibbe Veldkamp. She has also made drawings for Sesamstraat. By 2023 she had worked on more than 200 books for children and teenagers.

Hoogstad designed the poster for the 2001 Kinderboekenweek. Together with the illustrators Philip Hopman and Alex de Wolf, she painted murals in the Wilhelmina Kinderziekenhuis in Utrecht.

=== Own picture books ===
Since 2005 Hoogstad has also made her own picture books. The first was Bolder en de boot (Bolder and the boat, 2005); by then she had already illustrated at least 150 books by others. The KRO adapted the book for the screen. Her partner Anton (Ton) Wegman wrote the text of some of her picture books. For Nino en Nina (Querido, 2011) she made the drawings first, after which Wegman wrote the text.

Monsterboek (Monster book; Lemniscaat, 2014) was her first picture book of her own with Lemniscaat. The book has no text: a girl walks with crayons through a black-and-white town and draws monsters in colour, which come to life and turn the town upside down. According to Hoogstad, the girl is herself: as a child she drew in chalk on the pavements and walls of Rhoon and had to clean the walls as a punishment. On 23 September 2015, at the Rijksmuseum, she received the Gouden Penseel for the book; the award goes every year to the best-illustrated children's book. According to the jury, the book tells less of a story than it shows an "optische ontwikkeling" ("optical development"), and is above all about looking. In 2014 the Swiss publisher aracari Verlag published an edition titled Das kunterbunte Monsterbuch (The colourful monster book). An installation based on the book was designed for the children's museum Villa Zebra in Rotterdam.

Lemniscaat later published Kom uit die kraan!! (Come out of that crane!!, 2015), which she made with Tjibbe Veldkamp, and Mijn oma is een ooievaar (My grandma is a stork, 2016). Veldkamp received a Zilveren Griffel for Kom uit die kraan!! in 2016; in 2024 the book was chosen for the campaign Geef een prentenboek cadeau (Give a picture book as a present).

=== Other commissions ===
For De nachtlantaarns van meneer Makkelie (Mr Makkelie's night lanterns; Hoogland & Van Klaveren), thirteen children's authors, among them Paul van Loon, Bette Westera, Annet Schaap and Jan Paul Schutten, wrote pieces to accompany drawings by Hoogstad; Sjoerd Kuyper wrote the introduction. Reviewing the book in Trouw, Bas Maliepaard called the drawings beautiful and wrote that the glow of the colours and the grainy texture strengthen their dreamlike character.

Commissioned by the Rijksmuseum van Oudheden in Leiden, Hoogstad drew ten portraits of monsters and mythical creatures for the children's exhibition Monsters en mythische wezens (Monsters and mythical creatures), planned to run from 1 June 2025 to 3 January 2027. The stories for the exhibition were written by Clinty Thuijls.

== Exhibitions ==
After the Gouden Penseel was awarded in 2015, the original illustrations of the winners, Hoogstad among them, were exhibited in the Teekenschool of the Rijksmuseum. From 1 October 2023 to 7 April 2024, Museum Kranenburgh showed original illustrations by Hoogstad from various books, in an exhibition with a studio in which visitors could make work of their own. In 2025 her work was shown in the exhibition Monsters! at Villa Verbeelding in Hasselt. Her work has also been exhibited at Museum Coda in Apeldoorn, the Letterkundig Museum in The Hague and at an IBBY international children's book exhibition in Bratislava.
