= Noni Lichtveld =

Dutch writer (1929–2017)

- Born: Maria Johanna Francisca Renée Lichtveld; 29 May 1929; Abcoude, Netherlands
- Died: 16 August 2017 (aged 88); Laren, Netherlands
- Occupation(s): Scenic designer, author, illustrator
- Parent: Lou Lichtveld

Maria Johanna Francisca Renée "Noni" Lichtveld (3 May 1929 – 16 August 2017) was a Dutch-Surinamese author, illustrator and scenic designer.

== Biography ==
Lichtveld was the second daughter of the Surinamese author Lou Lichtveld (also known as "Albert Helman") and Dutch author Leni Mengelberg. The family lived near Barcelona from 1932 to October 1936, when Mengelberg returned to the Netherlands with the children because of her husband's infidelity and the outbreak of the Spanish Civil War. Her mother remarried with architect Benjamin Merkelbach in 1940.

Lichtveld attended drawing training at the Rietveld Academy and studied at the French trade union of scenic designers, Syndicat des Décorateurs de Théatre in Paris. After her study, she provided the sets for many Dutch theater companies and worked with theater greats such as Erwin Piscator and Sonia Gaskell.

In addition to sets, she made murals and illustrations and covers for children's books, both in Suriname and the Netherlands. A wall mosaic of hers can be seen in Huize Frankendael from 1957, the year that her stepfather, as city architect of Amsterdam, received it as an official residence.

From 1958 to 1964, Lichtveld lived with her husband, actor and director Ton Verwey, in Suriname when he was sent there by the Foundation for Cultural Cooperation. There, in 1960, she and Wilfred Teixeira were the first teachers of a series of courses leading to the founding of the School of Dramatic Art on April 23, 1965.

Lichtveld made her writing debut in 1984 with the children's book Anansi. De spin weeft zich een web om de wereld ("Anansi. The spider weaves a web around the world"). For this collection of short stories she received the Dutch award Vlag en Wimpel.

In 1987, together with Gerda Havertong, she received the E. du Perron Prize for the preservation and dissemination of the Anansi story. The prize money (2,500 guilders) was invested in 1988 in a study trip to Ghana, where Lichtveld searched for Anansi stories.

Lichtveld died on 16 August 2017 in the Rosa Spier Huis in Laren, where she spent the last years of her life.

== Bibliography ==
- Anansi. De spin weeft zich een web om de wereld (1984)
- Anansi en die andere beesten (1985)
- Verhalen van Surinaamse schrijvers (1989)
- Mijn pijl bleef in de kankantri (1993)
- Anansi tussen god en duivel (1997)

Illustrations

- Mies Bouhuys, De dromendoos (1955)
- Mies Bouhuys, De wijzen uit het Oosten: de tocht van de wijze mannen naar de stal van Bethlehem (1967)
- Mies Bouhuys, Een sprietje groen: het verhaal van de profeet Jesaja (1967)
- Mies Bouhuys, De gebroken kruik: het verhaal van de profeet Jeremia (1968)
- Mies Bouhuys, De lange reis: het verhaal van de uittocht uit Egypte (1968)
- M.Th. Hijlaard, Zij en ik (1978)
- Edgar Cairo, Ik ga dood om jullie hoofd (1980)
- Dolf Verroen and Nannie Kuiper, Ons Surinaamse ik (1984)
- Johan Ferrier, Het grote Anansi boek (1986)
- Thea Doelwijt, Volksverhalen uit kleurrijk Nederland (1990)
- Diana Lebacs, De verhalenboom: verhalen uit alle windstreken voor kinderen van 5 tot 99 jaar (1997)
