= Judith Ten Bosch =

Dutch painter and illustrator (born 1957)

- Born: Judith Maria Ten Bosch; 26 April 1957 (age 69); Dordrecht, Netherlands

Judith Maria Ten Bosch (born 26 April 1957, Dordrecht) is a Dutch painter and illustrator.

== Biography ==
Ten Bosch was born in 1957, and is one of twins born to Lou Ten Bosch and Ank Stumpel. She has four other siblings. Between 1976 and 1980, she studied at the Academie voor Beeldende Kunsten Sint-Joost in Breda.

For a decade, she illustrated recipes in the children's page of NRC Handelsblad together with Philip Mechanicus. These illustrations and recipes were bundled in the publications De vrolijke keuken (1997), Het kleine fornuis (1997), and Een warm pannetje (2004). The book De vrolijke keuken was awarded the Zilveren Griffel in 1998. The book was one of the books donated by the State Secretary for Culture and Media Rick van der Ploeg to 500 disadvantaged schools in Amsterdam, Rotterdam, Utrecht, and The Hague.

Ten Bosch also illustrated Hai die koe (1998), written by Mara Otten; Meis en Manneke en de stastoel (2002), written by Patricia Kuiper; and Een boek vol beesten - Neushoorn (2005), written by Marjolijn Hof.

Since 2002, she has collaborated with Titus Nolte.

In 2005, she illustrated the book Onder de kerstboom - Het denneboompje by Hans Christian Andersen.

In 2006, she illustrated the book Sprookjes van de planeet aarde by Anne Vegter together with her sister Geerten Ten Bosch . Both sisters participated in the Biennial of Illustration Bratislava in 2007 to exhibit their illustrations for this book.

In 2011, she illustrated the book Mijn opa en ik en het varken oma by Marjolijn Hof. Hof won a Vlag en Wimpel award for this book the following year.

Several of her paintings are part of the collection of the Centraal Museum in Utrecht, Netherlands. One of her paintings is part of the collection of the Dordrechts Museum.
