= Carli Biessels =

Dutch writer of children's literature

- Born: 1936; Nijmegen, Netherlands
- Died: 16 September 2016 (aged 79–80); Nijmegen, Netherlands
- Occupation: Writer
- Children: 4
- Writing career
- Genre: Children's literature
- Notable awards: Woutertje Pieterse Prijs 2010

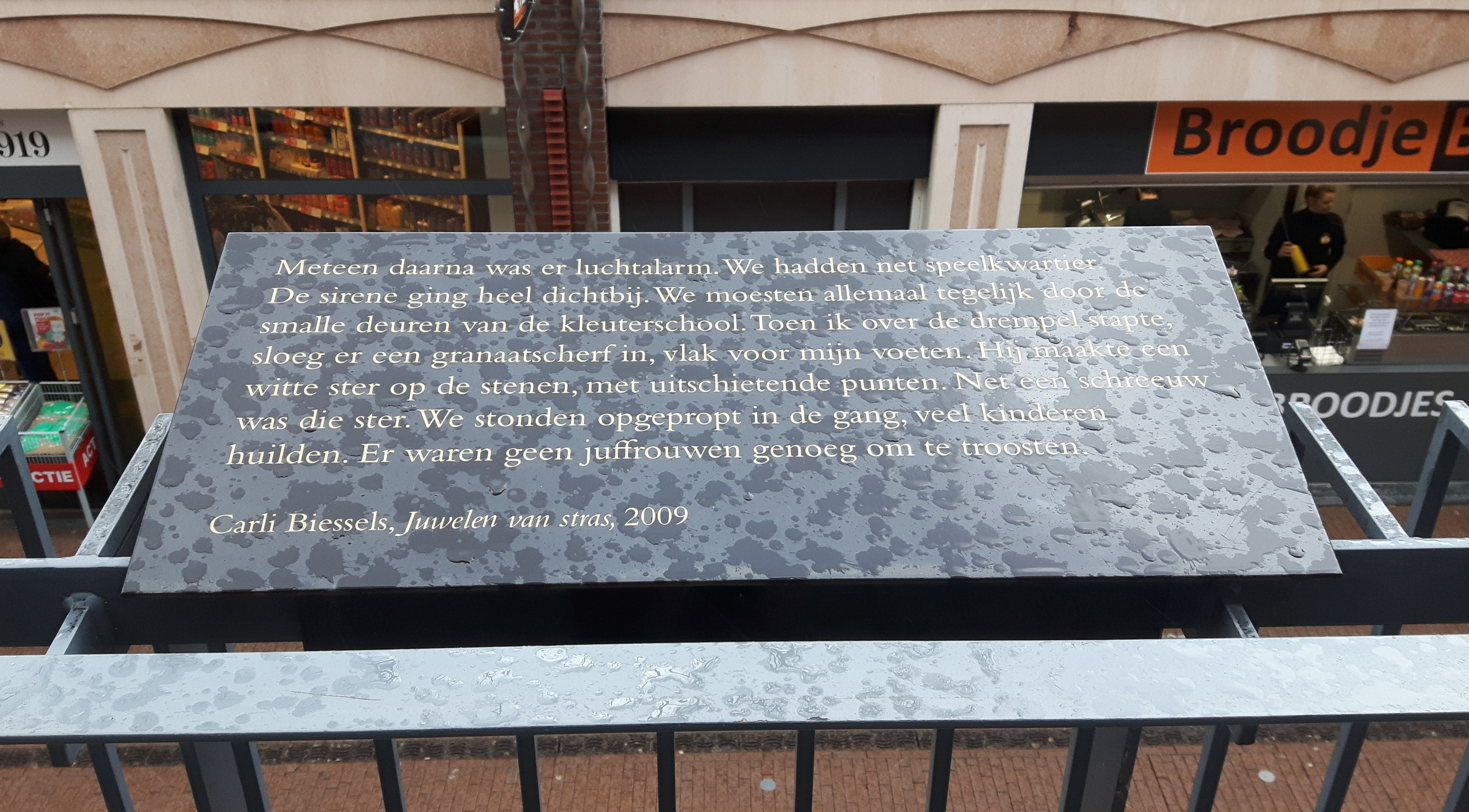
Quote by Biessels on a plaque in Nijmegen

Carli Biessels (1936 – 16 September 2016) was a Dutch writer of children's literature.

== Biography ==
Biessels was born and died in Nijmegen, where she studied pedagogy. Biessels worked in the field of children psychiatry and orthopedagogy.

Before writing books for children Biessels wrote various stories for children's magazines Okki and Taptoe. Biessels made her debut as an author at 62 years of age with her book Twee druppels water (1998). The book was on the Longlist for the Gouden Uil award in 1999.

In 2010, she won the Woutertje Pieterse Prijs for her book Juwelen van stras. She also received the Vlag en Wimpel award in 2001 for her book De feestrede and in 2007 for her book Irah en de dieren. Her last book Ik moet je iets belangrijks vertellen (2016) was published posthumously.

Her books have been illustrated by various illustrators, including Martijn van der Linden, Harmen van Straaten and Marije Tolman. Other illustrators include Patsy Backx, Marjolein Hund and Wolf Erlbruch. Her book Anton en het kamelenkleed (1999) was illustrated by one of her daughters.

Hanni Ehlers and Mirjam Pressler have translated some of her books to German.

Biessels married and had four children.

== Awards ==
- 2001: Vlag en Wimpel, De feestrede
- 2007: Vlag en Wimpel, Irah en de dieren
- 2010: Woutertje Pieterse Prijs, Juwelen van stras

== Publications ==
- Twee druppels water (1998)
- Anton en het kamelenkleed (1999)
- Sinterklaas' verhalen: over mijterrekjes, voetbalschoenen en de rode staf (1999)
- De buurman van de Magere Heinen (2000)
- De feestrede (2000)
- Tussen Mees en Mol (2002)
- De zee, de zee (2002)
- Doortje wil naar de zee kijken (2003)
- Op doortocht (2004)
- De meeste dingen gebeurden onverwachts (2005)
- Irah en de dieren (2006)
- Geknipt (2008)
- Juwelen van stras (2009)
- Lucas en de woorden: een verhaal over leren lezen (2011)
- Ik moet je iets belangrijks vertellen (2016)
