= Sylvia Weve =

Dutch illustrator (born 1954)

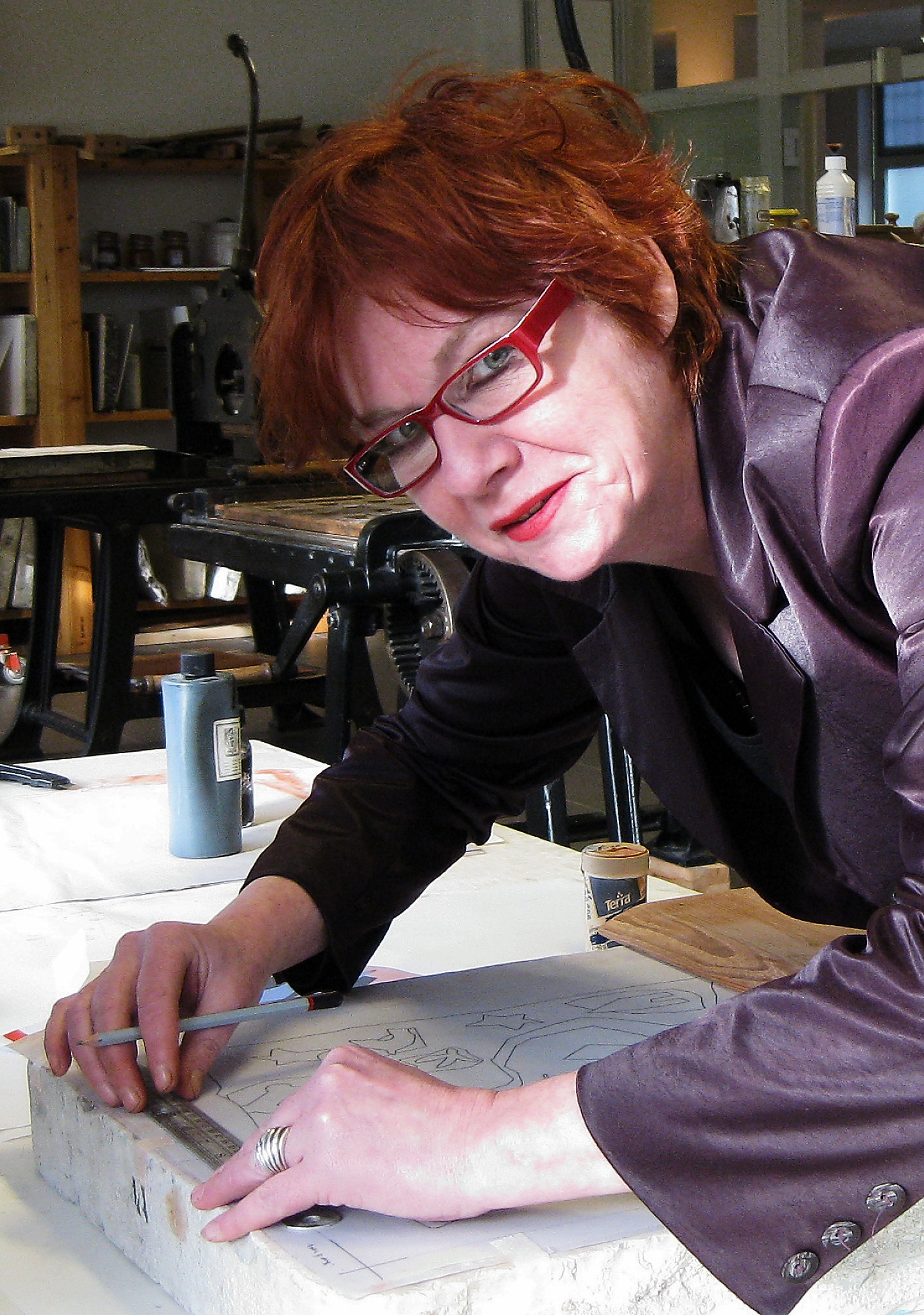
- Sylvia Weve (2008)
- Born: 28 May 1954 (age 71); Utrecht, Netherlands
- Known for: Illustration
- Awards: Gouden Penseel 2013; Woutertje Pieterse Prijs 2015 2020; Max Velthuijs-prijs 2019

Sylvia Weve (born 28 May 1954) is a Dutch illustrator.

Weve has illustrated over 150 books and she has received numerous awards for her work, including the Gouden Penseel, the Woutertje Pieterse Prijs and the Max Velthuijs-prijs.

== Career ==
In 1983, Weve made her debut as children's book illustrator by illustrating the book Een noom op school written by Corrie Hafkamp. Early in her career, Weve illustrated many books by Rindert Kromhout. Weve went on to illustrate many books by numerous authors including Karel Eykman, Veronica Hazelhoff, Ted van Lieshout, Bies van Ede and Edward van de Vendel. In 2006, she published Kip en ei, a book which she both wrote and illustrated herself.

Later in her career she started collaborating with Bette Westera and they both won various awards for their work, including the Woutertje Pieterse Prijs in 2015. They also won this award in 2020 for their book Uit elkaar.

In 2019, she won the prestigious Max Velthuijs-prijs for her entire oeuvre.

Weve also created illustrations for children's magazines including Okki, Taptoe, Jippo, Ezelsoor and St. Kitts van de Bovenwindse. Weve's work can also be found in magazines and newspapers such as Viva, Elsevier, Opzij, NRC Handelsblad and De Volkskrant.

== Awards ==
- 1983: Vlag en Wimpel, Wie verliefd is gaat voor (written by Karel Eykman)
- 1984: Zilveren Penseel, Oma, waar blijft de taart? (written by Veronica Hazelhoff)
- 1990: Vlag en Wimpel, Lastige portretten (written by Karel Eykman)
- 1991: Zilveren Penseel, Het bad van de zandloper (written by Rindert Kromhout)
- 1998: Vlag en Wimpel, Magische tekens
- 2007: Vlag en Wimpel, Kip en ei
- 2013: Gouden Penseel, Aan de kant, ik ben je oma niet! (written by Bette Westera)
- 2013: Vlag en Wimpel, Aan de kant, ik ben je oma niet! (written by Bette Westera)
- 2013: Vlag en Wimpel, Dat zou ik nooit doen! (written by Bette Westera and Naomi Tieman)
- 2015: Vlag en Wimpel, Doodgewoon (with Bette Westera)
- 2015: Woutertje Pieterse Prijs, Doodgewoon (with Bette Westera)
- 2019: Max Velthuijs-prijs, entire oeuvre
- 2020: Woutertje Pieterse Prijs, Uit elkaar (with Bette Westera)
