= Leopold (publisher) =

Dutch publishing house

- Founded: 1923
- Country of origin: Netherlands
- Headquarters location: Amsterdam
- Official website: www.leopold.nl

Leopold is a Dutch publishing house focused on children's literature based in Amsterdam, Netherlands. Leopold was founded in 1923 by H. P. Leopold, owner of the magazine Haagse Post.

== History ==
Leopold published its first children's book Java Ho! (De Scheepsjongens van Bontekoe) by Johan Fabricius in 1924. In the years that followed Leopold published of many Dutch authors, including Miep Diekmann, Tonke Dragt (The Letter for the King), Dolf Verroen, Burny Bos, Paul van Loon, Nannie Kuiper, Selma Noort, Lydia Rood, Rindert Kromhout, Maren Stoffels, Gideon Samson, Diederiekje Bok and Hein Mevissen.

The company has also published many children's picture books by many Dutch illustrators, including Max Velthuijs, Jan Jutte, Yvonne Jagtenberg, Annemarie van Haeringen, Harmen van Straaten and Wouter van Reek.

In 1984, Leopold and Miep Diekmann together with Alice van Romondt and Liesbet ten Houten helped found Aruban publishing company Charuba.
