= Marije Tolman =

Dutch illustrator of children's literature

- Born: 1976 (age 48–49)
- Known for: Illustration
- Awards: Gouden Penseel 2010

Marije Tolman (born 1976) is a Dutch illustrator of children's literature.

== Career ==
In 2010, she won the Gouden Penseel award together with her father Ronald Tolman for her illustrations in the book De boomhut. She also won the Vlag en Wimpel award in 2008 for her illustrations in the book Mejuffrouw Muis en haar heerlijke huis written by Elle van Lieshout and in 2018 for her illustrations in the book Voor papa written by Daan Remmerts de Vries.

In 2019, she won the Zilveren Penseel award for her illustrations in the book Vosje written by Edward van de Vendel.

== Awards ==
- 2008: Vlag en Wimpel, Mejuffrouw Muis en haar heerlijke huis
- 2010: Gouden Penseel, De boomhut (with Ronald Tolman)
- 2018: Vlag en Wimpel, Voor papa
- 2019: Zilveren Penseel, Vosje
