= Eric Smaling =

Dutch politician and agronomist

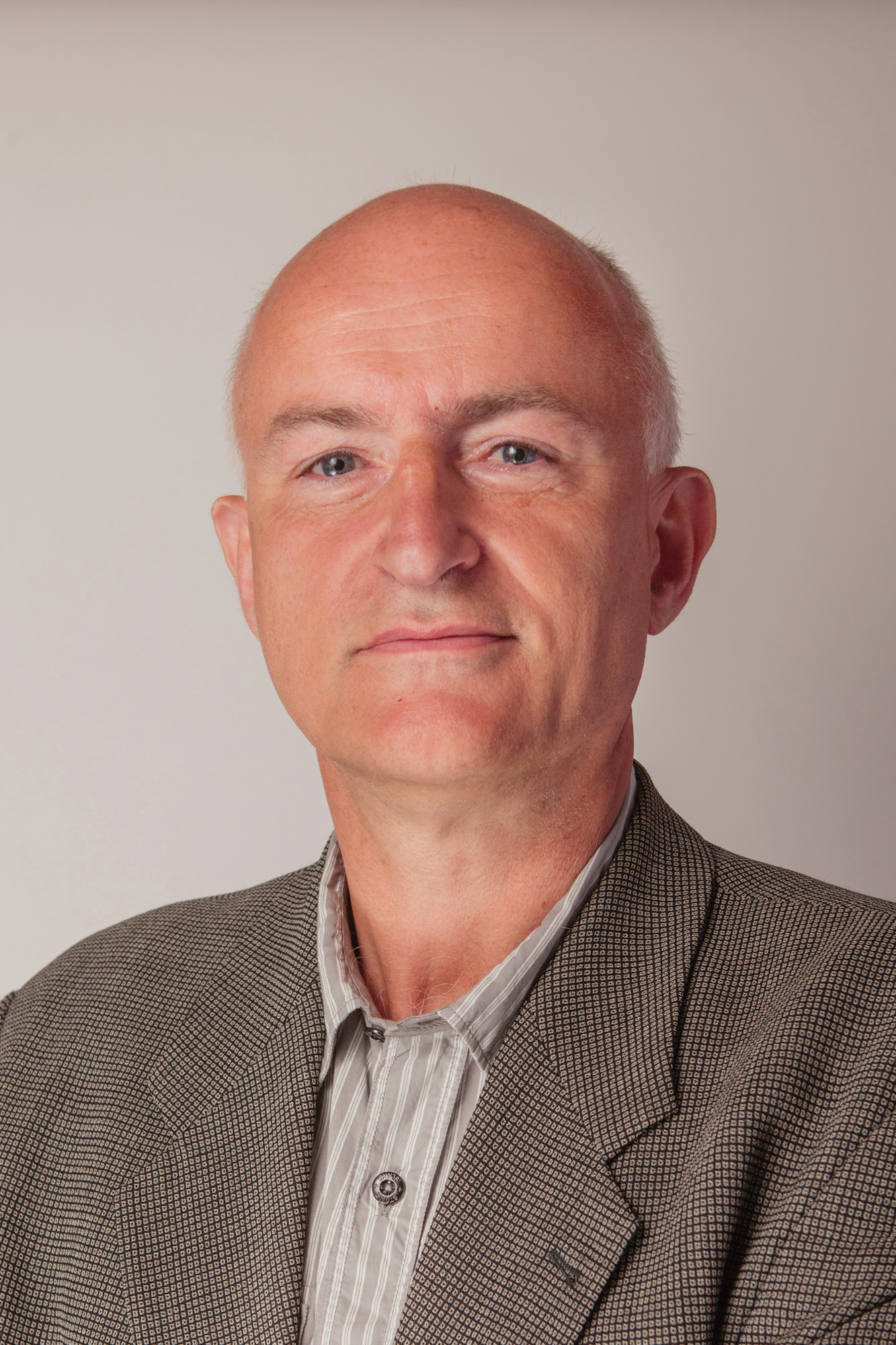
- Eric Smaling

Member of the House of Representatives
- In office 14 May 2013 – 23 March 2017

Member of the Senate
- In office 2007–2013

Personal details
- Born: 18 August 1957 (age 68) Amsterdam
- Party: Socialist Party
- Occupation: Politician

Eric Marc Alexander Smaling (born 18 August 1957 in Amsterdam) is a Dutch politician and agronomist. As a member of the Socialist Party (Socialistische Partij) he was an MP between 14 May 2013 and 23 March 2017. He replaced Manja Smits, initially temporarily, and definitively from 15 April 2014). From 2007 to 2013, he was a Senator; he was replaced by Arda Gerkens.

Smaling studied agronomy at Wageningen University and Research Centre and specialised in soil science and manure. He was also a professor at this university. Since 2004, he has been a professor at ITC Enschede.

He is partner of children's writer Rindert Kromhout and resides in Weesp.
