= Geerten Ten Bosch =

Dutch graphic designer and illustrator

- Born: Geerten Maria Ten Bosch; 21 April 1959 (age 67); Dordrecht, Netherlands
- Known for: Illustration

Geerten Maria Ten Bosch (born 21 April 1959) is a Dutch graphic designer and illustrator.

== Early life ==
Ten Bosch was born in Dordrecht in 1959 as one of five children of Lou Ten Bosch and Ank Stumpel.

Between 1980 and 1984 she studied graphic and typographic design at the Royal Academy of Art in The Hague but she did not complete her studies. One of her teachers was Alfons van Heusden.

== Illustrator ==
In 1985, she started children's magazine St. Kitts van de Bovenwindse with Clara Linders, named after Saint Kitts island. The initial financing for St. Kitts van de Bovenwindse was made possible by Ilona Fennema who made available the remaining money after the end of children's magazine Kris Kras. Further financing was made possible by the Nederlands Comité voor Kinderzegels. The magazine only lasted a year but this marked the beginning of her collaborative efforts with Linders, Harriët van Reek and Anne Vegter.

In 1989, she illustrated the children's book De dame en de neushoorn, written by Anne Vegter, for which they both won the Woutertje Pieterse Prijs in 1990. The main characters in this book were first introduced in the children's magazine St. Kitts van de Bovenwindse. Ten Bosch received the Vlag en Wimpel award for her illustrations in Verse bekken! which is also written by Anne Vegter. Ten Bosch illustrated Vegter's book Harries hoofdingang (1999) as well as Sprookjes van de planeet aarde (2006), the latter in collaboration with her sister Judith Ten Bosch. Both sisters participated in the Biennial of Illustration Bratislava in 2007 to exhibit their illustrations in this book.

Between 1994 and 1996, she illustrated stories written by Toon Tellegen which were published every other week in NRC Handelsblad. These stories were published in the book De verjaardag van alle anderen in 1998. In 1996, she received the Gouden Penseel award for her illustrations in De verjaardag van de eekhoorn (1995), written by Toon Tellegen.

In 1995, she illustrated the book Het huis van Marie written by Clara Linders. In 2018, Ten Bosch and Harriët van Reek presented their picture book Ei! Ei! De wonderlijke reis van twee eieren en een poppenkast on the occasion of Easter 2018.

== Artist ==
With Harriët van Reek she formed artist collective Banketje and they went on to create various works of art. Some of these art works were purchased by the Museum Boijmans Van Beuningen and the Nordic Watercolour Museum.

In 2001, she created an art work together with artist Moritz Ebinger for the library in Maassluis.

== Awards ==
- Woutertje Pieterse Prijs (1990, De dame en de neushoorn, written by Anne Vegter)
- Vlag en Wimpel (1991, for Verse bekken!, written by Anne Vegter)
- Gouden Penseel (1996, for De verjaardag van de eekhoorn, written by Toon Tellegen)
