= Bette Westera =

Dutch children's writer (born 1958)

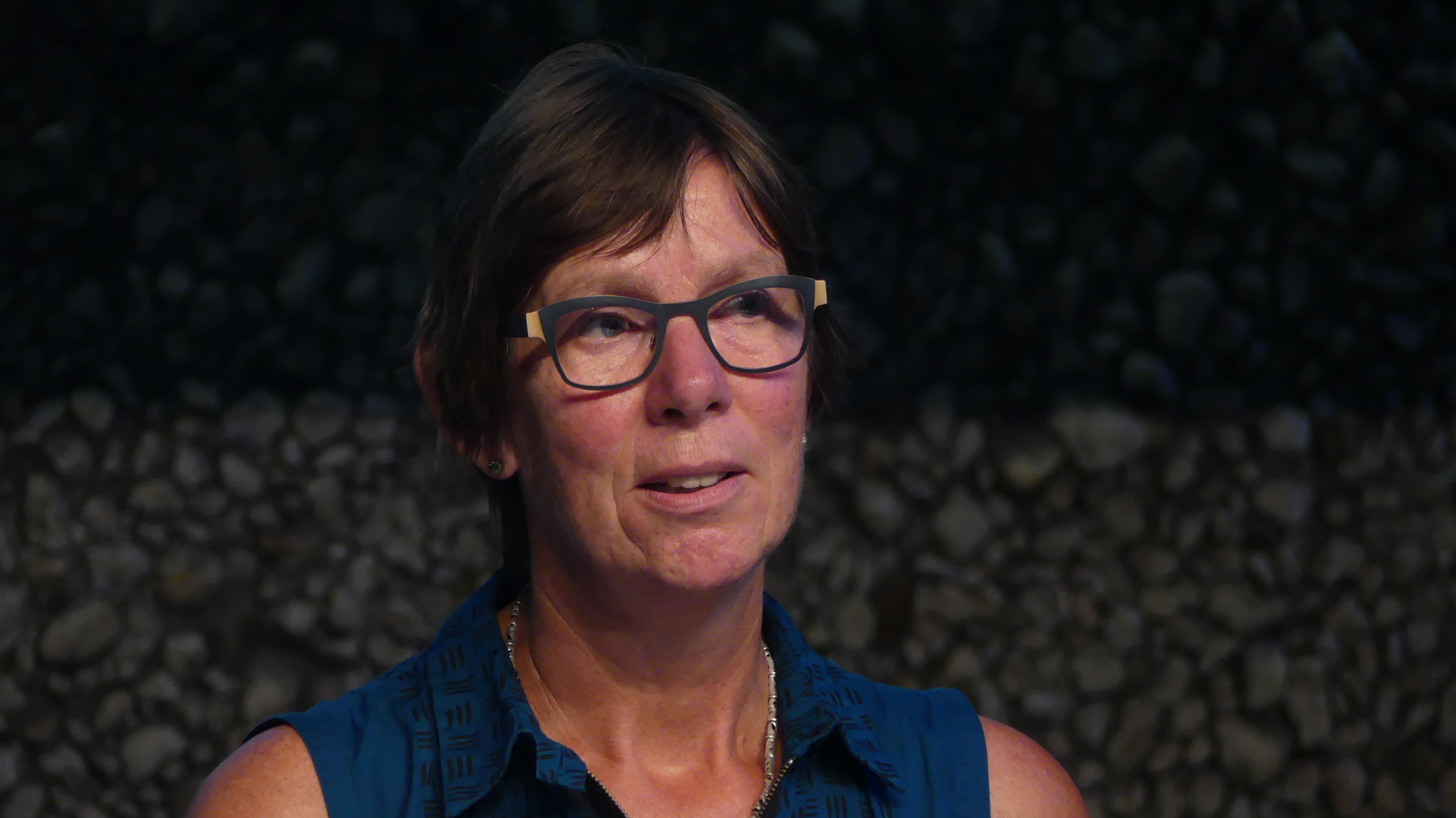
- Bette Westera (2016)
- Born: 20 June 1958 (age 66); Doesburg, Netherlands
- Notable awards: Gouden Griffel 2015; Woutertje Pieterse Prijs 2015

Bette Westera (born 20 June 1958) is a Dutch children's writer. She has won numerous awards for her work.

== Career ==
Westera made her debut as children's book author in 1999 with the book Wil je met me trouwen? Westera went on to win numerous awards for her work, including the Gouden Griffel and the Woutertje Pieterse Prijs in 2015 for her poetry collection Doodgewoon (with illustrations by Sylvia Weve). The previous time a poetry collection won the Gouden Griffel award was twenty years prior in 1995 (Ted van Lieshout's Begin een torentje van niks).

She also won several Zilveren Griffel awards as well as several Vlag en Wimpel awards over the years.

Westera's books have been illustrated by many illustrators, including Annemarie van Haeringen, Barbara de Wolf, Harmen van Straaten, Yvonne Jagtenberg and Sylvia Weve.

== Awards ==
- 2001: Vlag en Wimpel, Een opa om nooit te vergeten
- 2003: Vlag en Wimpel, Alle hens aan dek
- 2006: Vlag en Wimpel, Oma´s rommelkamer
- 2011: Zilveren Griffel, Ik leer je liedjes van verlangen, en aan je apenstaartje hangen
- 2013: Vlag en Wimpel, Aan de kant, ik ben je oma niet! (with Sylvia Weve)
- 2013: Vlag en Wimpel, Dat zou ik nooit doen! (with Naomi Tieman and Sylvia Weve)
- 2014: Zilveren Griffel, Held op sokken
- 2015: Woutertje Pieterse Prijs, Doodgewoon (with Sylvia Weve)
- 2015: Gouden Griffel, Doodgewoon
- 2015: Vlag en Wimpel, Kietel nooit een krokodil
- 2016: Vlag en Wimpel, In een slootje ben ik een bootje
- 2017: Zilveren Griffel, Baby'tje in mama's buik
- 2018: Zilveren Griffel, Was de aarde vroeger plat? (with Sylvia Weve)
- 2018: Vlag en Wimpel, Dag poes! (with Koos Meinderts, Sjoerd Kuyper, Hans Hagen and Monique Hagen)
- 2020: Woutertje Pieterse Prijs, Uit elkaar (with Sylvia Weve)
- 2020: Boekenleeuw, Uit elkaar
- 2024: Mildred L. Batchelder Award honor, Later, When I’m Big (Later als ik groot ben)
