= Martijn van der Linden =

Dutch illustrator (born 1979)

- Born: 1979 (age 46–47)
- Known for: Illustration
- Awards: Woutertje Pieterse Prijs 2016; Gouden Penseel 2017

Martijn van der Linden (born 1979) is a Dutch illustrator.

== Career ==
Van der Linden illustrated the book Stem op de okapi written by Edward van de Vendel and they both won the Woutertje Pieterse Prijs in 2016 for this work. For this book he also received a Vlag en Wimpel award in 2016.

In 2017, van der Linden won the Gouden Penseel award for illustrating the book Tangramkat, written by his wife Maranke Rinck. The book includes a seven-piece tangram puzzle which can be reorganised into pictures of various animals. The illustrations in this book were also part of an exhibition in the Rijksmuseum in Amsterdam that year. In 2018, he received a Vlag en Wimpel award for illustrating the book Van wie is die staart? written by Joukje Akveld.

In 2020, he donated a large part of his personal collection of illustrations to the Literatuurmuseum in The Hague, Netherlands.

Van der Linden has illustrated books by numerous Dutch authors, including Carli Biessels, Benny Lindelauf, Jan Terlouw, Lieneke Dijkzeul and Dolf Verroen. Other authors include Bibi Dumon Tak, Paul van Loon and Annie M.G. Schmidt.

== Awards ==
- 2016: Woutertje Pieterse Prijs, Stem op de okapi
- 2016: Vlag en Wimpel, Stem op de okapi
- 2017: Gouden Penseel, Tangramkat
- 2018: Vlag en Wimpel, Van wie is die staart?
- 2020: Zilveren Griffel, Wat je moet doen als je over een nijlpaard struikelt
- 2024: Boon for Children's and youth literature, Neem nooit een beste vriend (with Erna Sassen)
