= Marjolijn Hof =

Dutch writer

Marjolijn Hof (born 1956) is a Dutch writer who lives in Amsterdam. She has won many awards including the "Gouden Uil Jeugd Literatuurprijs', the "Gouden Uil Prijs van de Jonge Lezer" and the "Gouden Griffel"..

In 2012 she received the Vlag en Wimpel award for her book Mijn opa en ik en het varken Oma with illustrations by Judith Ten Bosch. Ten Bosch also illustrated her book Een boek vol beesten - Neushoorn (2005).

== Works in English translation ==
- Against the Odds, Groundwood Books (2011) ISBN 0-8889-9950-X
- Mother Number One, Groundwood Books (2011) ISBN 1-55498-078-X
