= Diana Lebacs =

Curaçaoan writer and actress (1947–2022)

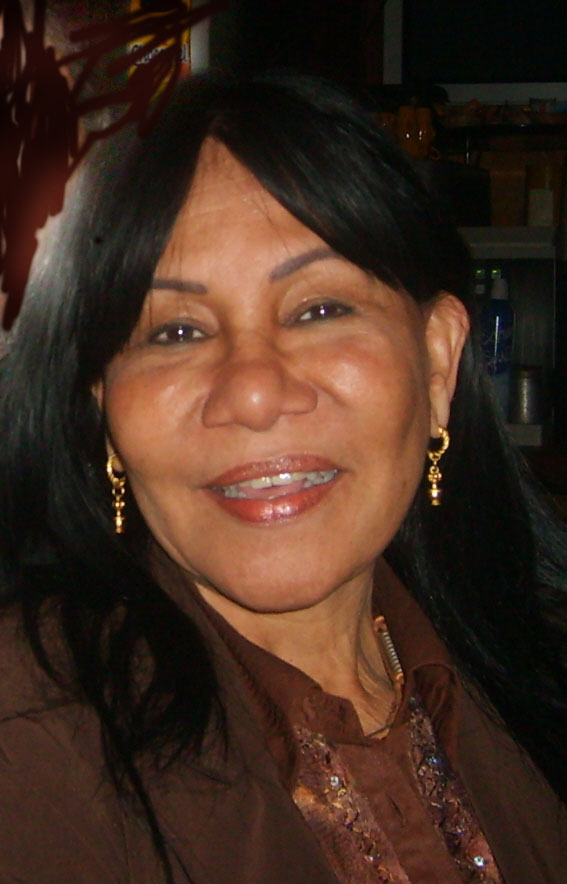
- Lebacs in 2008 in Amsterdam
- Born: Diana Melinda Lebacs; 12 September 1947; Willemstad, Territory of Curaçao, Kingdom of the Netherlands
- Died: 11 July 2022 (aged 74); Willemstad, Curaçao, Kingdom of the Netherlands
- Occupations: Writer, actress, educator
- Years active: 1971–2022

Diana Melinda Lebacs (12 September 1947 – 11 July 2022) was a Curaçaoan educator, actress, and author, most known for her children's literature. She wrote in both Papiamento and Dutch. In 1976 she received the Zilveren Griffel (Silver Stylus) award, one of the Netherlands' highest honors for youth literature, for her book Nancho van Bonaire. In 2003 she earned the inaugural Prins Bernhard Cultuurfonds Caribisch Gebied (PBCCG Cultuurprijs, Prince Bernhard Caribbean Cultural Fund Prize) for her book Caimin's geheim and in 2007 she was honored as a Knight in the Order of Orange-Nassau.

== Early life ==
Diana Melinda Lebacs was born on 12 September 1947 in the Chere Asile neighborhood of Willemstad, capital of the Territory of Curaçao. Her mother, Esther Amalia Doelwijt, was Creole from Suriname and spoke Sranan Tongo, having moved to Curaçao at the age of eighteen. Her father, Willem Mertjo Lebacs, was a chief customs officer who also worked as a carpenter and artistic woodcarver. Willem's father was from Bandabou on Curaçao; he had completed his military service in Indonesia and married a Malay woman there before returning to Curaçao. Her grandmother never learned Dutch and only spoke the Malay language and Papiamento. As her parents could only communicate in Dutch, Lebacs grew up speaking Dutch and Papiamento at home.

After Lebacs completed her primary education at the Philomena School, she attended the María Immaculata Lyceum for her secondary studies. During this time (1960–1961), she began writing novels for teenage girls. She also sang in a band called Teenage Shadows from 1963 to 1966. In 1966, she graduated from the Willemstad Pedagogical Academy. The play performed at the commencement ceremony, Regels voor ezels (Rules for Donkeys), was written by Lebacs. The following year, she married Pacheco Domacassé, who had directed Teenage Shadows and was also a guitarist and singer. He would later head the cultural section of the Education and Cultural Department of Bonaire.

== Career ==
In May 1968, Lebacs' mother died. In August, she and her husband embarked on a six-month tour of western Europe. During their travels, she began to write a novel, Sherry—het begin van een begin (Sherry—The Beginning of the Beginning), a coming of age story of an Antillean girl. The novel delved into the socio-economic development of the islands and the labor strikes which occurred in conjunction with anticolonial uprisings in Curaçao in 1969. That summer, she sent the book to Leopold Publishing in The Hague and waited six months for their response. After agreeing to publish the novel and completing the edits they wanted, Lebacs enrolled in a two-year Papiamento literary course in 1970 to gain a better insight into the lingua franca of her homeland. She wanted to publish children's stories in the language spoken by children in the Dutch Antilles.

In 1971, Sherry premiered and two years later was translated into Finnish by the publisher Tammi. In 1973, Lebacs wrote a youth theater play, which was the first dramatization written in Papiamento in over twenty-five years. Buchi Wan pia fini (Buchi Wan Skinny Legs), premiered with her husband as director, was a critique of European education systems and featured live exchanges between the actors and the audience. After its debut, the play was presented several times in Aruba, Bonaire and Curaçao and published in 1974. Her 1975 book Nancho van Bonaire earned the Zilveren Griffel (Silver Stylus) award in 1976, the first time the honor had been given to a non-European author.

Lebacs continued working on several fronts simultaneously throughout the 1980s and 1990s. She published children's fiction in Dutch and Papiamento, educational textbooks for elementary students, developed television programs about the Spanish and Dutch colonization history of Curacao, and acted in two films, Famia kibrá and Boka Sarantonio (Sarantonio Bay). She also participated in community projects including book fairs, workshops to end violence against women, and programs to protect the environment. In 1994, Lebacs published her first novel for adults, De langste maand (The Longest Month), which evaluates disparities in traditional local values and Westernized expectations.

In 2003 Lebacs earned the inaugural Prins Bernhard Cultuurfonds Caribisch Gebied (PBCCG Cultuurprijs, Prince Bernhard Caribbean Cultural Fund Prize) for her book Caimin's geheim (Caimin's Secret) and in 2007 was honored as a Knight in the Order of Orange-Nassau. That same year, she completed her bachelor's degree in Papiamento at the University of the Netherlands Antilles and went on to earn her master's degree in 2011. Subsequently, she began teaching courses in Papiamento at the university for beginning students. She was a winner of the 2012 Tapushi Literario prize. In 2014, Lebacs debuted her first collection of poetry, Belumbe/De Waterlijn (The Waterline).

== Personal life ==
Lebacs and her husband Pacheco had two children. Lebacs died from pancreatic cancer at a hospice in Willemstad on 11 July 2022 at the age of 74. Pacheco had died in March 2022 at the age of 80.

== Partial bibliography ==
- Lebacs, Diana (1971). Sherry: het begin van een begin [Sherry, The Beginning of a Beginning] (in Dutch). The Hague, The Netherlands: Leopold. ISBN 90-258-3937-1.
- Lebacs, Diana (1975). Nancho van Bonaire [Nancho of Bonaire] (in Dutch). The Hague, The Netherlands: Leopold. OCLC 252457187.
- Lebacs, Diana (1976). Chinina-kome-Lubida (in Papiamento). Curaçao: Montero. OCLC 69338550.
- Lebacs, Diana (1977). Ken-ken pia di wesu (in Papiamento). Curaçao: Montero. OCLC 66361746.
- Lebacs, Diana (1977). Nancho Matroos [Nancho the Sailor] (in Dutch). The Hague, The Netherlands: Leopold. ISBN 978-9-025-83943-7.
- Lebacs, Diana (1979). Nancho Niemand [Nancho the Nobody] (in Dutch). The Hague, The Netherlands: Leopold. ISBN 978-9-025-83920-8.
- Lebacs, Diana (1982). Nancho Kapitein [Nancho the Captain] (in Dutch). The Hague, The Netherlands: Leopold. ISBN 978-9-025-83928-4.
- Lebacs, Diana (1983). Suikerriet Rosy [Sugarcane Rosy] (in Dutch). The Hague, The Netherlands: Leopold. ISBN 978-9-025-83930-7.
- Lebacs, Diana (1990). Lichten boven Klein Bonaire [Lights above Little Bonaire] (in Dutch). The Hague, The Netherlands: Leopold. ISBN 978-9-025-83959-8.
- Lebacs, Diana (1994). De langste maand [The Longest Month] (in Dutch). Amsterdam, the Netherlands: In de Knipscheer. ISBN 978-9-062-65388-1.
- Lebacs, Diana (2001). Caimin's geheim [Caimin's secret] (in Dutch). The Hague, The Netherlands: Leopold. ISBN 978-9-025-83488-3.
- Lebacs, Diana (2009). Waar is Olivier?/Unda Olivier ta? [Where is Olivier?] (in Dutch and Papiamento). Willemstad, Curaçao: Fundashon Editorial Sembra Buki. ISBN 978-9-990-41181-2.
- Lebacs, Diana (2014). Belumbe/De waterlijn [The Waterline] (in Dutch and Papiamento) (1st ed.). Haarlem, The Netherlands: In de Knipscheer. ISBN 978-90-6265-861-9.
- Lebacs, Diana (2016). Duizend leugens bruidstaart: roman [A thousand lies wedding cake] (in Dutch) (Eerste uitgave ed.). Haarlem, The Netherlands: In de Knipscheer. ISBN 978-90-6265-924-1.
