= Harriët van Reek =

Dutch writer and illustrator

- Born: 21 November 1957 (age 68); Voorschoten
- Occupations: Writer, illustrator
- Writing career
- Genre: Children's literature
- Notable awards: Gouden Griffel 1987; Gouden Penseel 2016

Harriët van Reek (born 21 November 1957) is a Dutch writer and illustrator of children's literature.

== Biography ==
Van Reek was born in 1957 as the daughter of comic author Jan van Reek. For two months she studied at the Royal Academy of Art in The Hague. She then studied in Amsterdam to become a teacher in drawing and manual skills.

In 1986, she made her debut with the book De Avonturen van Lena Lena for which she was awarded the Gouden Griffel award a year later. The decision to award her the Gouden Griffel for this book was criticised. She also won the Vlag en Wimpel award for her illustrations in this book.

Since 1987, she has collaborated with Geerten Ten Bosch on various projects, such as books and puppetry shows. Initially, she worked with Ten Bosch on children's magazine St. Kitts van de Bovenwindse. The magazine only lasted a year but this marked the beginning of her collaboration with Ten Bosch. With Ten Bosch, she formed artist collective Banketje and they went on to create various works of art. Some of these artwork were purchased by the Museum Boijmans Van Beuningen and the Nordic Watercolour Museum.

In 1990, she received the Vlag en Wimpel award for the book Het bergje spek. She also won the Zilveren Penseel award for the book Bokje (2001) and also for the book Letterdromen met Do (2007).

In 2013, she published the book Edith en Egon Schiele, inspired by the life of Austrian painter Egon Schiele and his wife Edith. In 2016, she won the Gouden Penseel for the book Lettersoep. Van Reek wrote the book to encourage children to write by hand again in a time when children have become used to text messaging and digital communication.

== Awards ==
- 1987: Gouden Griffel, De Avonturen van Lena Lena
- 1987: Vlag en Wimpel, De Avonturen van Lena Lena
- 1990: Vlag en Wimpel, Het bergje spek
- 2002: Zilveren Penseel, Bokje
- 2008: Zilveren Penseel, Letterdromen met Do
- 2016: Gouden Penseel, Lettersoep

== Work ==
- De Avonturen van Lena Lena (1986)
- Het bergje spek (1989)
- Henkelman, ons Henkelmannetje (1996)
- Bokje (2001)
- Letterdromen met Do (2007)
- Edith en Egon Schiele (2013)
- Lettersoep (2015)
