= Gideon Samson =

Dutch children's writer (born 1985)

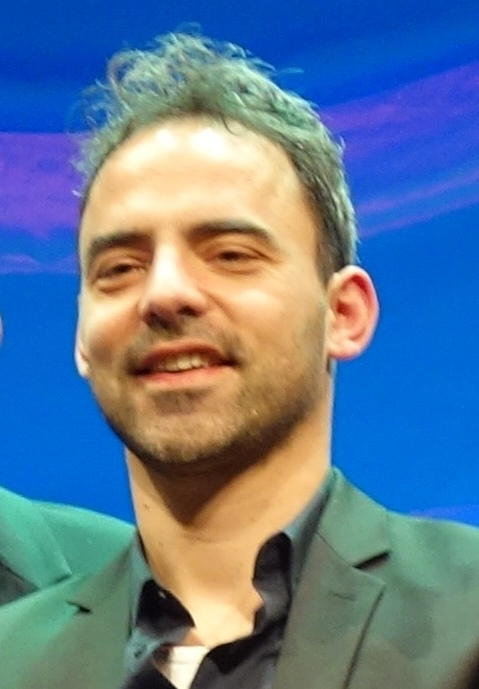
- Samson (2020)
- Born: 17 February 1985 (age 41); The Hague, Netherlands
- Writing career
- Notable awards: Gouden Griffel 2019; Nienke van Hichtum-prijs 2019

Gideon Samson (born 17 February 1985) is a Dutch writer of children's literature.

== Career ==
Samson made his debut as writer with the book Niks zeggen!. He received the Vlag en Wimpel award for this book in 2008. In March 2009, he published the book Ziek and he won the Zilveren Griffel award for this book, making him the youngest winner of this award. He also won the Vlag en Wimpel award in 2017 for the book Eilanddagen and in 2018 for the book Alle dieren drijven.

In 2019, he won three awards for his book Zeb.: the Zilveren Griffel, Gouden Griffel and the Nienke van Hichtum-prijs. His books have been published by the publisher Leopold.

== Awards ==
- 2008: Vlag en Wimpel, Niks zeggen!
- 2010: Zilveren Griffel, Ziek
- 2013: Zilveren Griffel, Zwarte zwaan
- 2017: Vlag en Wimpel, Eilanddagen
- 2018: Vlag en Wimpel, Alle dieren drijven
- 2019: Zilveren Griffel, Zeb.
- 2019: Gouden Griffel, Zeb.
- 2019: Nienke van Hichtum-prijs, Zeb.
