= Koos Meinderts =

Dutch writer of children's literature

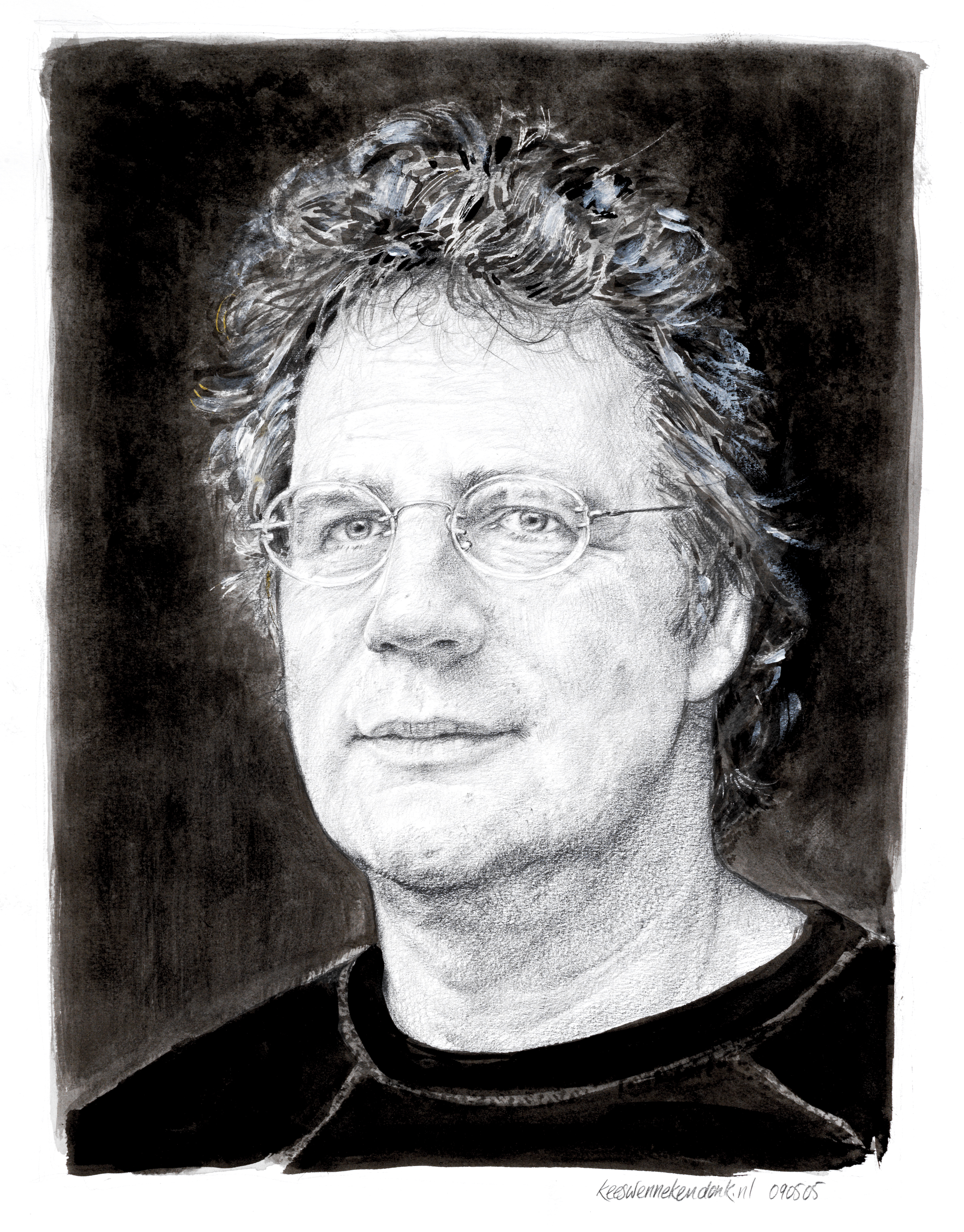
- Born: 20 January 1953 (age 72); The Hague, Netherlands
- Occupation: Writer
- Language: Dutch
- Notable awards: Boekenleeuw 2016; Gouden Griffel 2017

Koos Meinderts (born 20 January 1953) is a Dutch writer of children's literature.

== Career ==
Meinderts made his debut in 1983 with the children's book Mooi meegenomen.

In 2016, he won the Boekenleeuw for his book De zee zien. In 2017, he won the Gouden Griffel for his book Naar het noorden.

Meinderts won the Vlag en Wimpel award three times: in 2003 for the book Keizer en de verhalenvader, in 2018 for the book Dag poes! together with Bette Westera, Sjoerd Kuyper, Hans Hagen and Monique Hagen and in 2019 for the book De schelmenstreken van Reinaert de Vos.

In 2019, his book De Club van Lelijke Kinderen (The Club of Ugly Children) was made into a movie by Jonathan Elbers.

== Awards ==
- 2003: Vlag en Wimpel, Keizer en de verhalenvader
- 2016: Boekenleeuw, De zee zien
- 2017: Zilveren Griffel, Naar het noorden
- 2017: Gouden Griffel, Naar het noorden
- 2018: Vlag en Wimpel, Dag poes! (with Bette Westera, Sjoerd Kuyper, Hans Hagen, Monique Hagen)
- 2019: Vlag en Wimpel, De schelmenstreken van Reinaert de Vos
