= Midas Dekkers =

Dutch biologist, journalist, writer

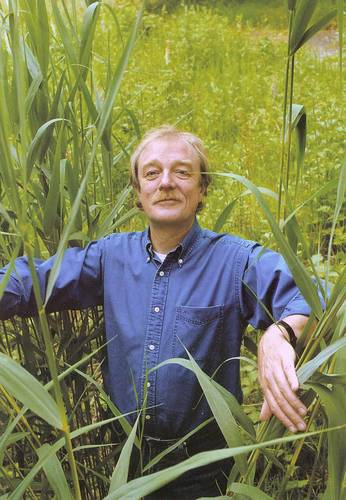
- Midas Dekkers
- Born: 22 April 1946 (age 79); Haarlem, the Netherlands

Wandert Jacobus Dekkers, better known as Midas Dekkers (born 22 April 1946 in Haarlem), is a Dutch biologist, presenter, and writer of fiction and non-fiction for children and adults. At the age of eighteen, he gave himself the name Midas (after Zeke Midas Wolf from Donald Duck).

The well-known children's book writer wrote over fifty children's and youth books, most of which contain stories. In his non-fictional youth books, Dekkers writes about subjects related to biology. Dekkers also writes fictional prose for adults. As a biologist, Dekkers is known for his sharp observations. He can explain biological-scientific themes with a sense of humour. Thanks to his writing style, his books have been reprinted many times.

Dekkers is also known for his often contrary and controversial opinions on subjects such as bestiality, having children, and sports.

== Bibliography (incomplete) ==
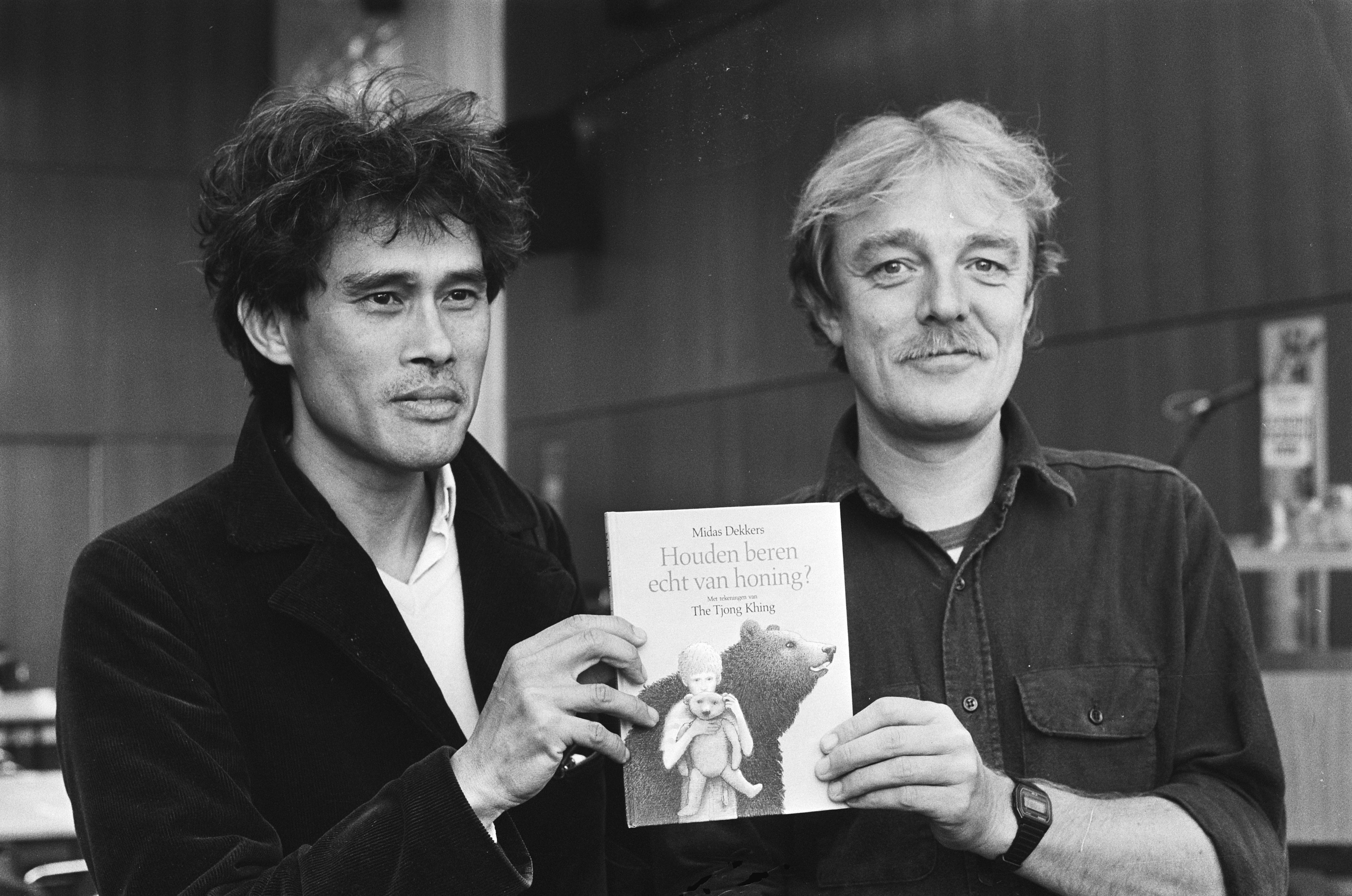
Kinderboekenweekgeschenk 1985 with Thé Tjong-Khing

- 1982 – Het walvismeer
- 1985 – Houden beren echt van honing?, illustrations Thé Tjong-Khing. (kinderboekenweekgeschenk)
- 1992 – Lief dier. Over bestialiteit
- 1995 – De kip en de pinguïn
- 1997 – De vergankelijkheid
- 1999 – De koe en de kanarie
- 2002 – De larf
- 2003 – Mummies
- 2004 – Poot, bundeling columns
- 2004 – Poes, bundeling columns
- 2005 – Pets, bundeling columns
- 2005 – De Hommel en andere beesten
- 2005 – ...leest A. Koolhaas, collection of stories by Anton Koolhaas, collected by Midas Dekkers.
- 2006 – De tor en de koeskoes, collection of columns
- 2006 – Lichamelijke oefening
- 2007 – De Walrus en andere beesten
- 2008 – ...leest de jaloerse kip en andere beesten (audiobook)
- 2009 – Piep. Een kleine biologie der letteren (boekenweekessay)
- 2011 – Rood: Een Bekoring
- 2014 – De kleine verlossing of de lust van ontlasten
- 2015 – De thigmofiel
- 2017 – Volledige vergunning
- 2021 – Wat loopt daar?
