= Käthe Recheis =

Austrian children's writer (1928–2015)

Käthe Recheis (11 March 1928, in Engelhartszell – 29 May 2015, in Linz) was an Austrian children's literature writer. She was the recipient of an Austrian State Prize, an Austrian Decoration for Science and Art, a Kulturpreis des Landes Oberösterreich, and a Heinrich Gleißner Prize.
