= Ida Vos =

Dutch writer

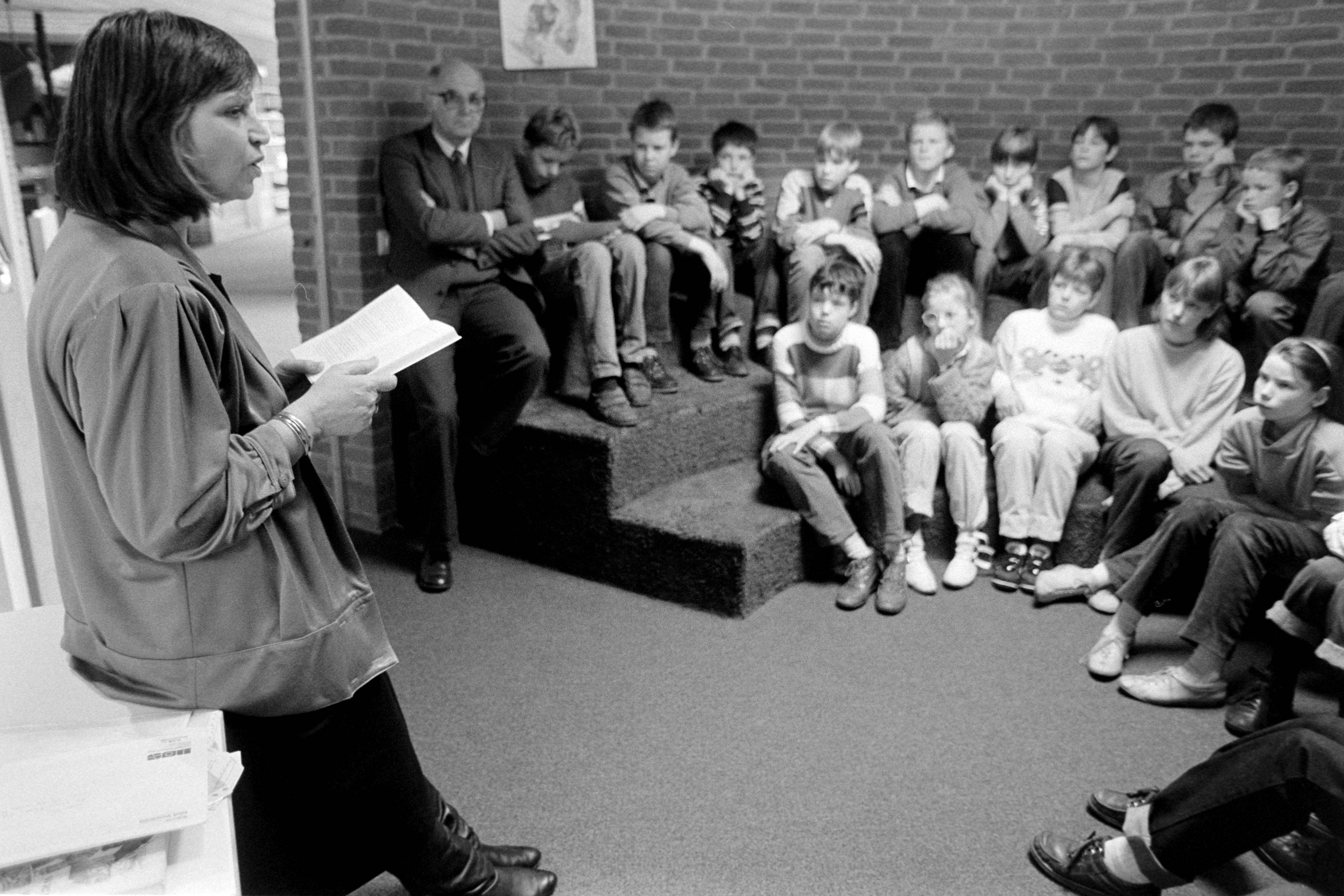
- Ida Vos reading her book to children and adults
- Born: Ida Gudema; December 13, 1931; Groningen
- Died: April 3, 2006 (aged 74); Amstelveen
- Occupations: Writer, educator

Ida Vos (maiden name Gudema) (Groningen, December 13, 1931 – Amstelveen, April 3, 2006) was a Dutch author. She wrote books for adults and children. In most of her books, Vos wrote about her experiences as a Jewish girl during the Second World War. Her best-known book was Wie niet weg is wordt gezien (published in English as Hide and Seek), which was awarded with a Dutch literature prize for children's books in 1982.

From 1936, Vos and her family lived in Rotterdam. In Rotterdam, she experienced the German bombardment of the city in May 1940, after which her family moved to Rijswijk (near The Hague). In 1943 the Gudema family went into hiding. Vos and her sister Elly were separated from their parents during this period (relating to her book Hide and Seek).

After the war Vos became a kindergarten teacher. She married in 1956, and had three children. During the 1970s she was admitted to a hospital due to her war traumas. This led to writing about her experiences, first as poems, but soon in the shape of stories and, eventually, children's books. Central in her work was the infringement on her freedom by the Nazi occupiers and the time she spent in hiding.

Vos died on April 3, 2006, in Amstelveen, at the age of 74.

== Works ==
Several of Vos's books have been translated into English by Terese Edelstein, Inez Smidt, and others.

- 35 Tranen (35 Tears, 1975)
- Schiereiland (Peninsula, 1979)
- Miniaturen (Miniatures, 1980)
- Wie niet weg is wordt gezien (Hide and Seek, 1981)
- Anne is er nog (Anna is still here, 1986)
- Dansen op de brug van Avignon (Dancing on the Bridge of Avignon, 1989)
- Witte zwanen, zwarte zwanen (White Swans, Black Swans, 1992)
- De sleutel is gebroken (The Key is Lost, 1996)
- De lachende engel (The Laughing Angel, 2000)
