= Mirjam Oldenhave =

Dutch writer

Mirjam Oldenhave (born 20 August 1960 in Hengelo) is a Dutch author of children's literature, and the author of the 2010 Kinderboekenweekgeschenk. Initially trained as a drama therapist, she taught drama and music in special education. She published her first children's book in 1998.

== See also ==
- List of publications during the Boekenweek
