= Ted van Lieshout =

Dutch writer of children's literature

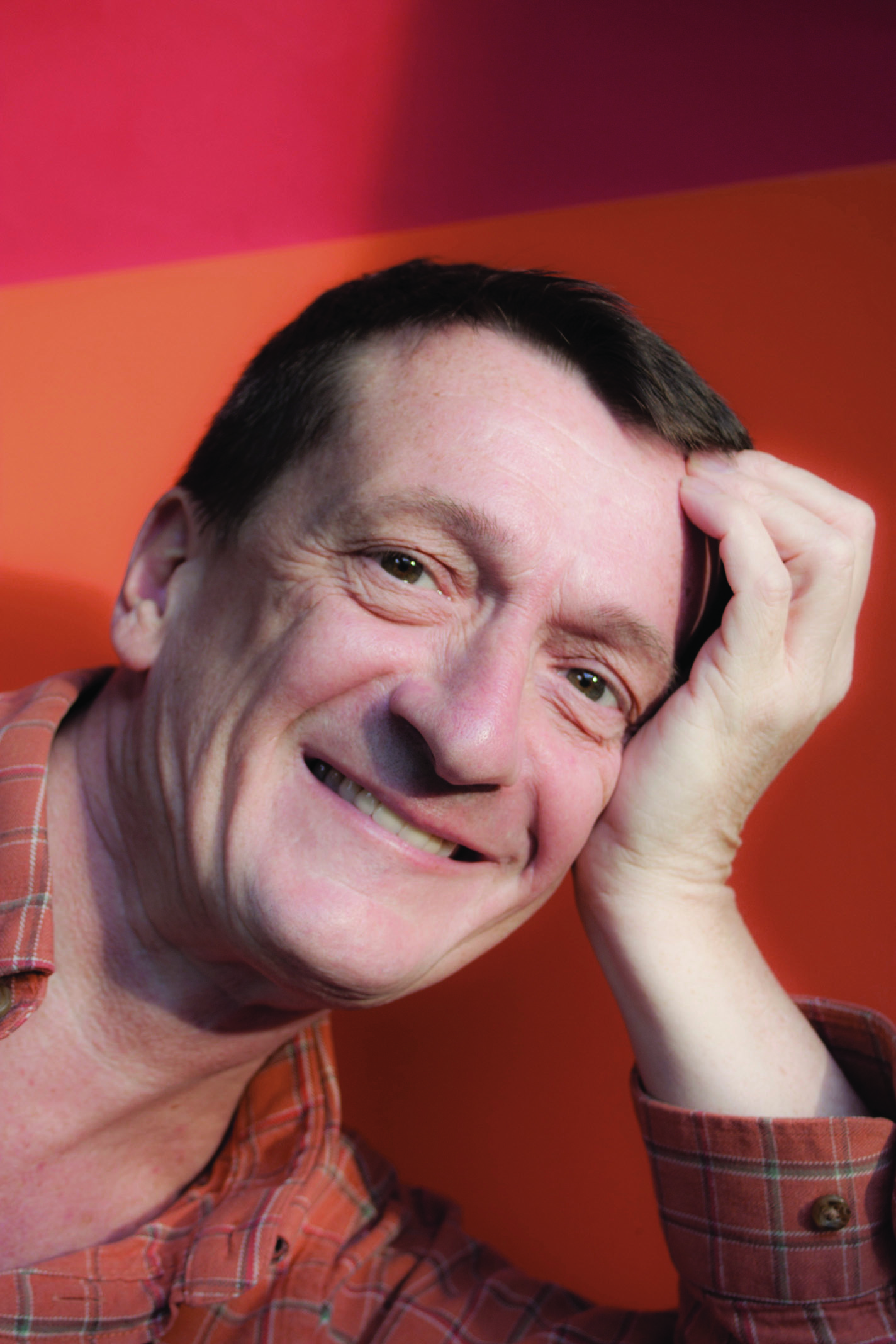
- Ted van Lieshout (2010)
- Born: Theodorus Adrianus (Ted) van Lieshout; 21 December 1955 (age 70); Eindhoven, Netherlands
- Writing career
- Notable awards: Gouden Griffel 1995; Nienke van Hichtum-prijs 2001; Theo Thijssen-prijs 2009; Woutertje Pieterse Prijs 2012

Ted van Lieshout (born 21 December 1955) is a Dutch poet and writer of children's literature. He has won numerous awards for his work.

== Early life ==
Van Lieshout was born in 1955 in Eindhoven, Netherlands. Van Lieshout studied Beeldende Kunsten en Vormgeving between 1975 and 1980 at the Gerrit Rietveld Academie in Amsterdam. Until 1990 he was part-time teacher at the Royal Academy of Art in The Hague. After graduating van Lieshout made drawings for the newspaper NRC Handelsblad as well as magazines such as Avenue and Blauw Geruite Kiel, the youth magazine of Vrij Nederland. He also contributed to the television shows Het Klokhuis and Sesamstraat. He became a full-time writer in 1990.

== Career ==
In 1995, he won the Gouden Griffel award for his book Begin een torentje van niks. This was the first time this award was given for a work of poetry.

Van Lieshout won the Zilveren Zoen for his book Gebr. He also won the Deutscher Jugendliteraturpreis in 1999 for the German translation of the book, Bruder, by Mirjam Pressler. The book has been translated into numerous languages.

In 2001, he won the Nienke van Hichtum-prijs for his book Zeer kleine liefde. In 2009, he won the Theo Thijssen-prijs for his entire oeuvre. In 2012, he won the Woutertje Pieterse Prijs for his book Driedeling paard. Van Lieshout was also nominated for this award in 2016 and 2018 for respectively the books Rond vierkant vierkant rond (2015) and Onder mijn matras de erwt (2017). He also received the Zilveren Griffel award for this book.

Van Lieshout was a finalist for the Hans Christian Andersen Award twice.

Van Lieshout's children's books have been illustrated by various illustrators, including Sieb Posthuma, Annemarie van Haeringen, Daan Remmerts de Vries and Sylvia Weve. Van Lieshout also illustrated many of his books himself. Since 2012 he makes picture books with Philip Hopman: the books about 'Boer Boris', a little farmer boy.

Alongside his work for children, van Lieshout has written novels for adults that address sexual abuse. According to the theatre company Het Nationale Theater, some of these draw on his own childhood experience, at age eleven, of a relationship with an adult man. These works include Mijn meneer (2012) and Schuldig kind (2017); the latter was adapted for the stage by Het Nationale Theater in a production directed by Belle van Heerikhuizen. His 2022 novel Beitelaar follows a fifteen-year-old boy's pursuit of an older man he meets at a cemetery job; reviewing it in De Groene Amsterdammer, a critic wrote that van Lieshout continues to write fearlessly about the ambiguities of sexual abuse.

== Awards ==
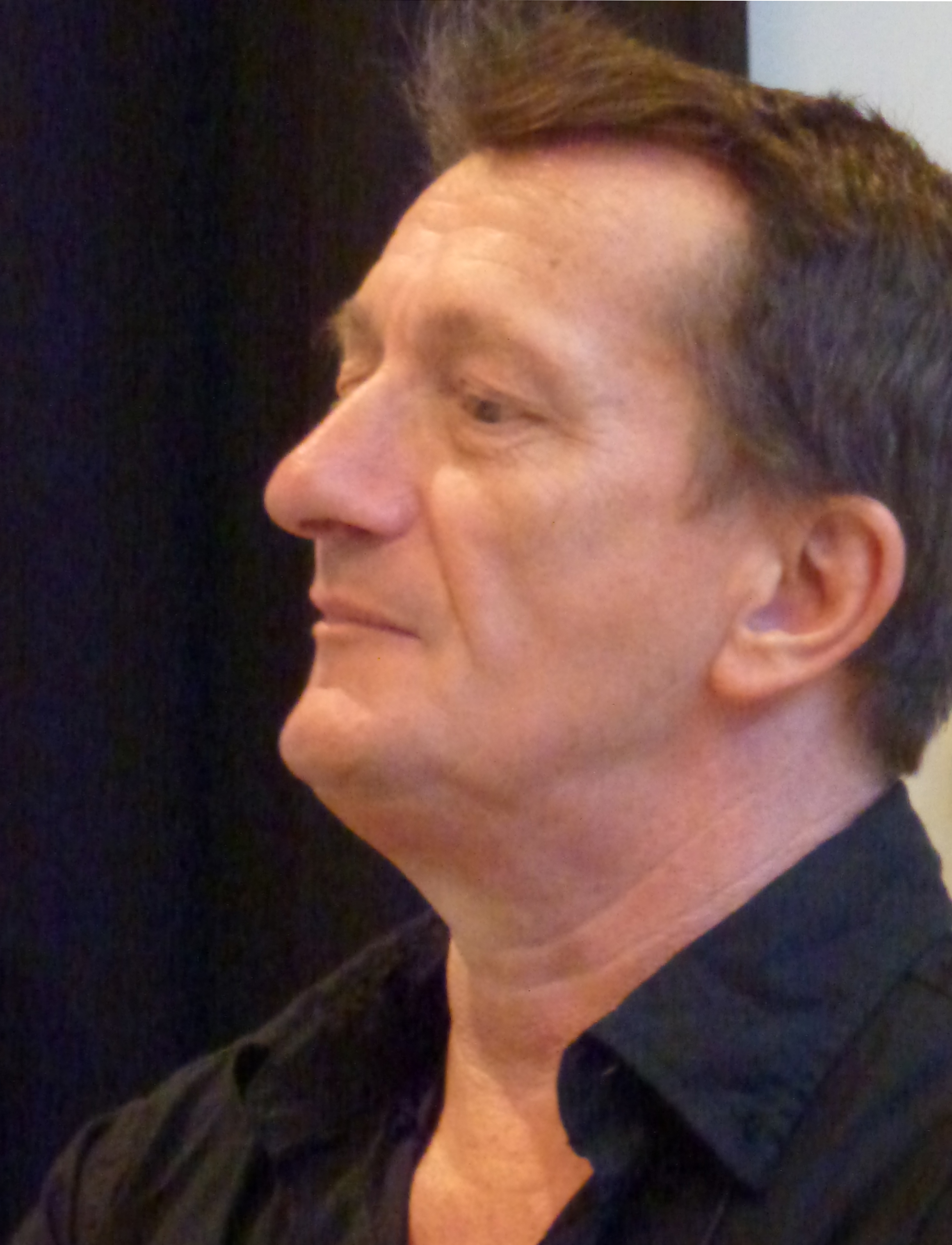
Ted van Lieshout (2014)

- 1987: Vlag en Wimpel, Van verdriet kun je grappige hoedjes vouwen
- 1989: Vlag en Wimpel, De allerliefste jongen van de hele wereld
- 1989: Zilveren Griffel, Och, ik elleboog me er wel doorheen
- 1991: Vlag en Wimpel, Ik ben een held
- 1991: Zilveren Griffel, Mijn botjes zijn bekleed met deftig vel
- 1994: Vlag en Wimpel, Toen oma weg was
- 1995: Gouden Griffel Begin een torentje van niks
- 1997: Zilveren Griffel, Mijn tuin, mijn tuin
- 1997: Zilveren Zoen, Gebr.
- 1999: Deutscher Jugendliteraturpreis, Bruder (German translation of Gebr. by Mirjam Pressler)
- 2001: Nienke van Hichtum-prijs, Zeer kleine liefde
- 2006: Zilveren Griffel, Mama! Waar heb jij het geluk gelaten?
- 2009: Theo Thijssen-prijs, entire oeuvre
- 2009: Zilveren Griffel, Spin op sokken
- 2010: Vlag en Wimpel, Ik wil een naam van chocola
- 2010: Zilveren Griffel, Hou van mij
- 2012: Vlag en Wimpel, Vijf draken verslagen
- 2012: Woutertje Pieterse Prijs, Driedelig paard
- 2012: Zilveren Griffel, Driedelig paard
- 2014: Vlag en Wimpel, Boer Boris in de sneeuw
- 2016: Zilveren Griffel, Rond vierkant vierkant rond
- 2019: Boekensleutel, Ze gaan er met je neus vandoor
- 2021: Zilveren Griffel, De gemene moord op Muggemietje
