= Hilde Vandermeeren =

Belgian writer (born 1970)

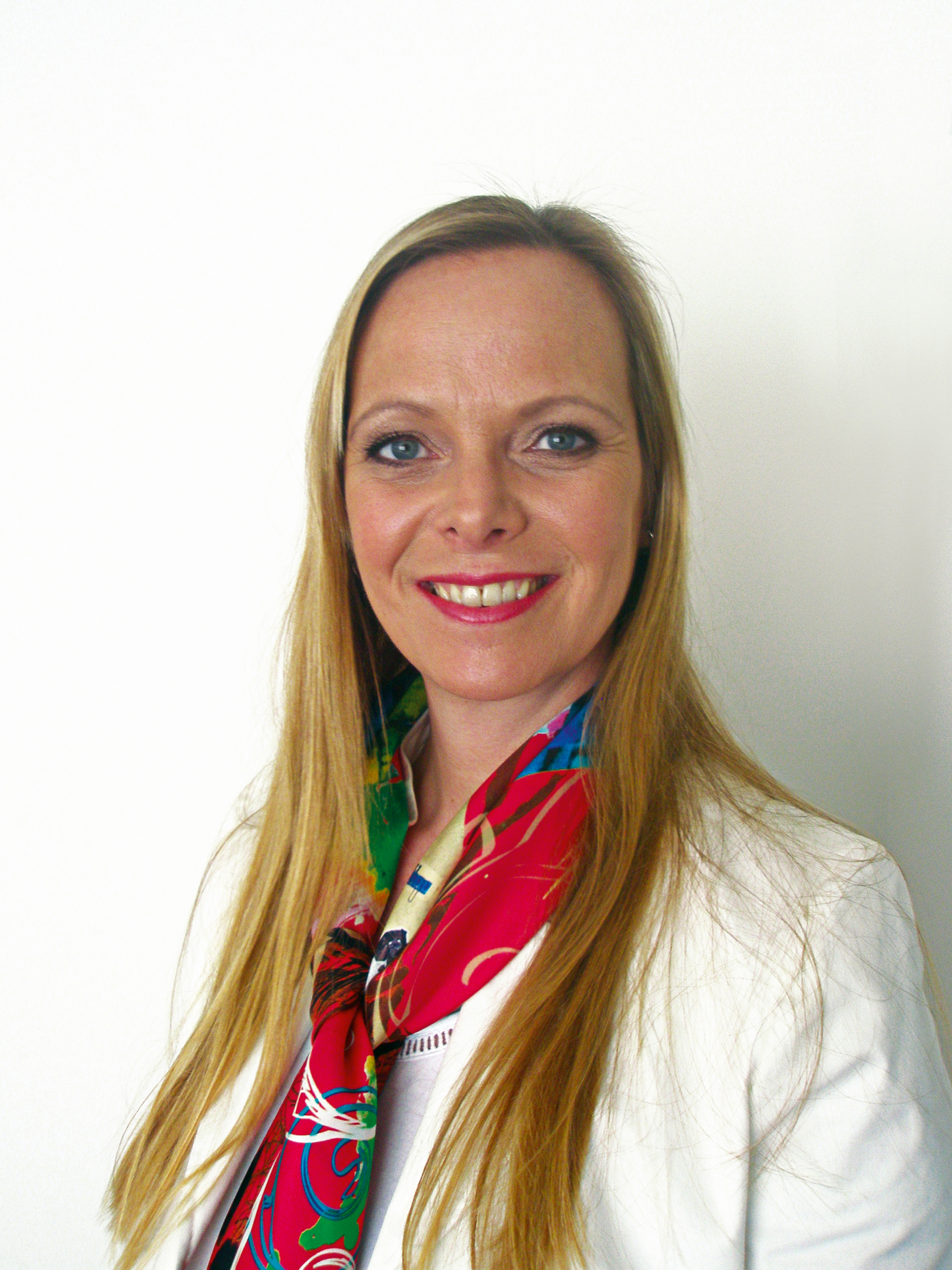
- Born: 25 September 1970 (age 56)
- Writing career
- Genres: thriller, children's books

Hilde Vandermeeren (born 25 September 1970, in Waregem) is a Belgian author of books for children and young people and psychological thrillers.

== Biography ==
Vandermeeren studied psychology and works as a teacher for adults (psychology, creative writing). Since 2001 she has published almost fifty books for children and young people, many of which have been translated into Danish, German, Spanish, Korean, French and Chinese. She has won a number of awards and prizes, including a Zilveren Griffel, a Boekenwelp and a White Raven from the International Youth Library.

Her thriller Als alles duister wordt – When Darkness Descends was published in April 2013 by Q (part of the Singel Publishers Group) and was awarded the Knack Magazine Hercule Poirot Readers Prize in the same year. It was also longlisted for the Diamond Bullet in 2013. Q also published her psychological thrillers De toeschouwers – The Watchers in 2014, Stille grond - Silent Ground in 2015, and Scorpio in 2016. In 2016, Silent Ground was shortlisted for the Golden Nose, the annual award for the best crime novel in the Dutch language. Movie rights for the novel were also sold to Eyeworks Film & TV Drama (Belgium), a part of the international Eyeworks Group.

Her short story The Lighthouse was published in the March/April 2016 edition of Ellery Queen's Mystery Magazine. The second short story Stranger in the Night was released in December 2016 in the same magazine. The Lighthouse was shortlisted for the Derringer Award 2017 Best Short Story. In 2017, Schemerzone was published and received the Hercule Poirot Prize for the best Flemish crime novel of the year. It was also longlisted for the BookSpot Golden Nose in 2018.

The first part of a trilogy in collaboration with criminal lawyer Walter Damen was published in 2018: Restless, followed by Bottomless (2019) and Relentless (2020). This trilogy and her other work are part of the international project DETECt of the KU Leuven, a collaboration between European Universities, TV-channels and professionals from the creative sector.

The worldwide English Rights of Scorpio (The Scorpion's Head) are sold to the UK publishing house Pushkin Press for publication in October 2021. The book is translated by Laura Watkinson and part of a new series Walter Presents, books selected by producer Walter Iuzzolino.

In 2021, Vandermeeren became an honorary citizen of Torhout because of her achievements in the literary sector.

== Awards and nominations ==
Adults

- Hercule Poirot Readers' Prize (Belgium, 2013)
- Longlist Nomination Diamond Bullet (Belgium, 2013)
- Longlist Nomination Hebban Crimezone Thriller Award (The Netherlands, 2014)
- Shortlist Nomination Golden Nose (The Netherlands, 2016)
- Shortlist Derringer Award Best Short Story (USA, 2017)
- Hercule Poirot Prize for best Flemish Crime Novel of the Year (Belgium, 2017)
- Longlist BookSpot Golden Nose (The Netherlands, 2018)
- Longlist VRT Lang Zullen We Lezen-Award category Thrillers (Belgium, 2018)
- Longlist MAX Gouden Vleermuis 2019 - Oeuvre Prize (The Netherlands, 2019)
- Honorable Mention Sabam-jury for Best Author (Belgium, 2020)

Children and young people

- Woord- en Beeld Prize (The Netherlands, 2002)
- Longlist Nomination Golden Owl - Literature for young people (2003)
- Third place - Children and young people Jury Flanders (2004)
- Zilveren Griffel (The Netherlands, 2005)
- Vlag en Wimpel (The Netherlands, 2006)
- Third place - Children and young people Jury Flanders (2006)
- Boekenwelp (2007)
- White Raven (2007)
- Bronze Medal Literature Prize Province of West Flanders, books for children and young people (2009)
- Silver Medal Literature Prize Province of West Flanders, books for children and young people (2009)
- Vlag en Wimpel (The Netherlands, 2013)

General Cultural Awards

- Gouden Feniks 2009, Culture Prize awarded by the Houtland Foundation
- Culture Prize 2014 Torhout in the category Cultural Ambassador
- Juliaan Claerhout Prize 2017 awarded by Culture Council Wielsbeke
- Lifetime Achievement Award 2020 Culture Prize Torhout
- Honorary Citizen of Torhout

== Books ==
Adults

- Als alles duister wordt - As Darkness Descends (2013)
- De toeschouwers - The Watchers (2014)
- Stille grond - Silent Ground (2015)
- Scorpio (2016) / The Scorpion's Head (Pushkin Press, UK, 2021)
- Schemerzone - Shadow Zone (2017)
- Pas op voor de buren - Beware of the Neighbours (2018)
- Rusteloos - Restless : in collaboration with criminal lawyer Walter Damen (2018)
- Bodemloos - Bottomless: in collaboration with criminal lawyer Walter Damen (2019)
- Meedogenloos - Relentless: in collaboration with criminal lawyer Walter Damen (2020)

Children and young people

- Een vroege zomer (2001)
- Een huis om in te verdwalen (2002)
- De prinses en de kurk (2002)
- Het gebroken masker (2003)
- Krullen (2003)
- Het grote Zwinvoorleesboek (diverse auteurs, 2004)
- De twaalfde man (2004)
- Het kistje van Cleo (2005)
- Mijn eerste sprookjesgroeiboek (2006)
- Later word ik circusartiest (2006)
- Later word ik dierenarts (2006)
- Van een kind dat tikkertje speelt met de wind (2006)
- Mijn eerste griezelgroeiboek (2007)
- Schatten zoeken (2007)
- Later word ik brandweerman (2007)
- Later word ik balletdanseres (2007)
- Mijn geheime papa (2008)
- Opeens was ik er (2008)
- Mijn sprookjeskijkboek (2008)
- Mama wil op reis (2008)
- Later word ik verkoopster (2009)
- Later word ik juf (2009)
- Later word ik metselaar (2009)
- Later word ik politieman (2009)
- Maankind (2009)
- Nachtraven en de zaak van de verdwenen postbode (2009)
- Mijn mooiste dierensprookjeskijkboek (2009)
- Operatie Bernie buiten (2009)
- Later word ik dokter (2010)
- Later word ik kok (2010)
- Binnenpoes buiten (2010)
- Nachtraven en het geheim van Cornwall Castle (2010)
- Later word ik voetballer (2011)
- Later word ik kapster (2011)
- Nachtraven en het mysterie van de drie vazen (2011)
- Noor en Fien: het grote Paulien-plan (2011)
- Camping Zeevos (2012)
- Verboden te lachen (2012)
- Noor en Fien: strijd op de dansvloer (2012)
- De Vuurman (2012)
- Het geheim van Barry Boudini (2012)
- Het pleintje: Winterwarmte (2013)
- De jacht op de valse koekjes (2014)
- Het uitzonderlijke leven van Violetta Vonk (2014)
- Wolken boven Waterdorp (2015)
