= Dagmar Stam =

Dutch illustrator

- Born: 10 September 1945 (age 80); Amsterdam, Netherlands
- Occupation: Illustrator
- Notable work: Eend op de pot, Knofje, Iris en Michiel series

Dagmar Stam (born 10 September 1945 in Amsterdam) is a Dutch illustrator, best known for her work in children's literature. She gained prominence through her collaborations with popular children's authors such as Carry Slee, Jacques Vriens, and Burny Bos.

== Career ==
Stam studied drawing at a fashion academy in Amsterdam and later took evening courses in printmaking at the Gerrit Rietveld Academie while working at an advertising agency. She eventually became a freelance illustrator.

One of her early long-term projects was illustrating the "Libelle weet 't" column in the Dutch magazine Libelle, a role she held for about sixteen years. She also started contributing to the children's magazine Bobo in 1979.

In 1994, she received the Venz Kinderboekenprijs together with Carry Slee for Sneeuwman, pak me dan, the best-selling Dutch children's book of 1993.

== Illustrative Work ==
Stam illustrated her first children's books in 1978: Bas loopt weg and Wie wil koek? by Nini Jurriëns. She gained wider recognition when her illustrations for Eend op de pot (1981) by Nannie Kuiper were featured in the book that won the 1982 Gouden Griffel. In 1998, she updated the book with new watercolor illustrations.

She collaborated frequently with Burny Bos on the Knofje series, originally published in Bobo and later in book form, and with Jacques Vriens on books such as Dag, Sinterklaasje. Her most prolific collaboration was with Carry Slee, with whom she created the Iris en Michiel series starting in 1989. She worked together with Corrie Hafkamp during the 1980s drawing a large part of the Pinkeltje-series.

Stam developed a signature style that featured plump, expressive children with humorous features like button noses. She often used watercolor and pencil and aimed for a timeless aesthetic. To stay realistic, she frequently observed children in schools and public places and sketched them from life.

== Notable Projects ==
In 1988, Stam launched her own interactive picture book series titled Mix en maak... with titles like Je eigen huis and Je eigen kleding.

She also worked on Francine Oomen's Saartje en Tommie stories, which appeared on Sesamstraat and in various book formats like bath books and soft fabric books. Their collaboration also led to the creation of Voorleesverhalen uit Knuffeldorp in 1998.

With Carry Slee, Stam created the Kwispelstaartjes series in 1998, introducing young children to animals in themed environments.

== Recognition ==
Critics praised Stam's work for its emotional resonance and appeal to children. She and Carry Slee received the Venz Kinderboekenprijs for the most sold children's book of the year.

== Selected bibliography ==
=== As author and illustrator ===
- Je eigen dier (1988)
- Je eigen huis (1988)
- Je eigen kleding (1988)
- Je eigen voertuig (1988)

=== As illustrator (selection) ===
- Nini Jurriëns – Bas loopt weg (1978)
- Burny Bos – Knofje, waar zit je? (1980)
- Nannie Kuiper – Eend op de pot (1981)
- Carry Slee – Morgen mag ik in het diepe (1989)
- Carry Slee – Sneeuwman, pak me dan (1993)
- Francine Oomen – Voorleesverhalen uit Knuffeldorp (1998)
