= Daan Remmerts de Vries =

Dutch writer and illustrator (born 1962)

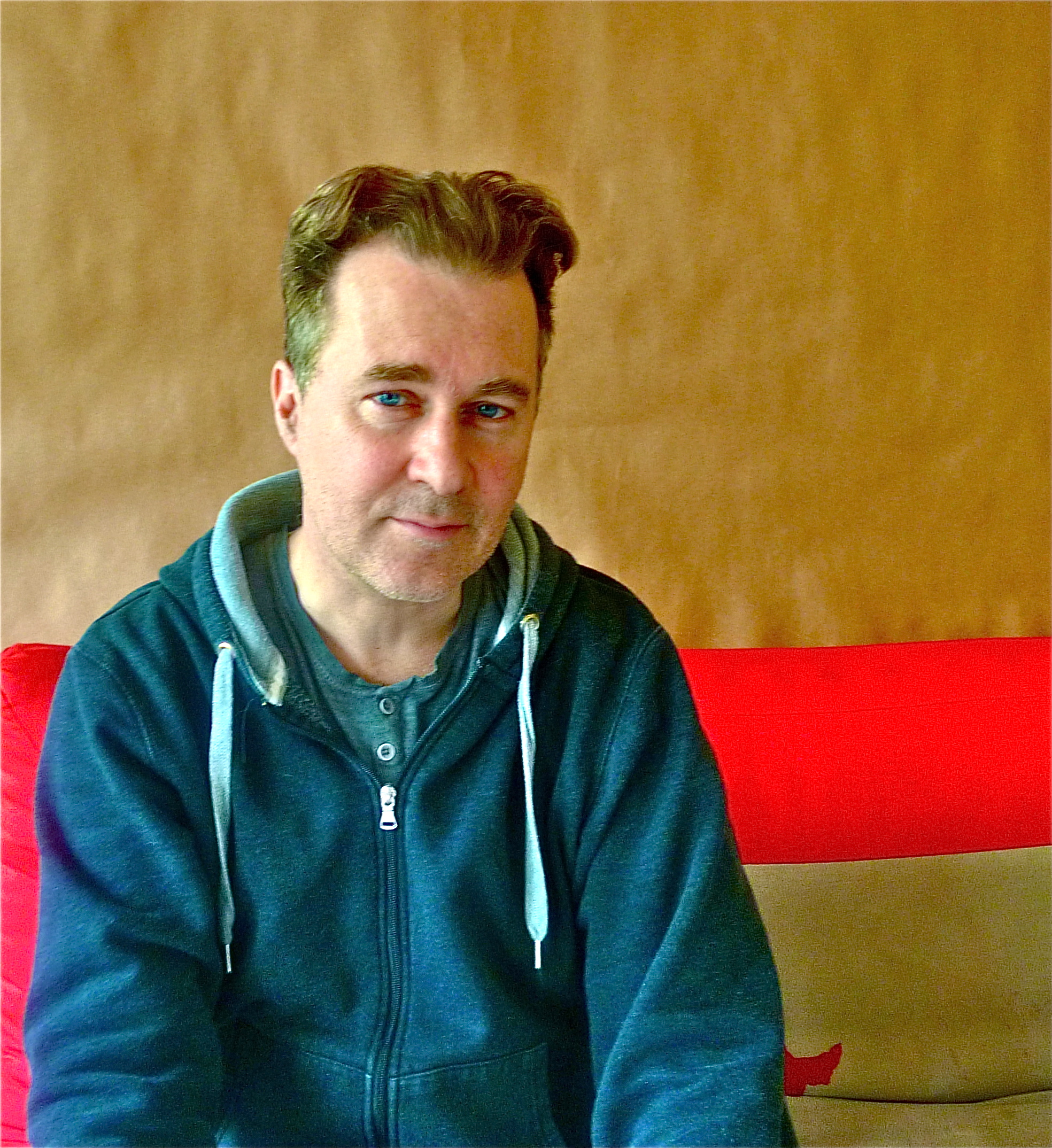
- Daan Remmerts de Vries (2016)
- Born: 5 April 1962 (age 62); Leeuwarden, Netherlands
- Occupation: Writer, illustrator
- Language: Dutch
- Notable awards: Gouden Griffel 2003 2010

Daan Remmerts de Vries (born 5 April 1962) is a Dutch writer and illustrator.

== Career ==
Remmerts de Vries made his debut in 1990 with Zippy en Slos, a collection of short stories.

He won the Gouden Griffel award twice: in 2003, for his book Godje and, in 2010, for his book Voordat jij er was. He also won the Zilveren Griffel award in 2015 for Soms laat ik je even achter and in 2017 for T.rex Trix in Naturalis.

In 2021, he won the Theo Thijssen-prijs for his entire oeuvre.

Remmerts de Vries has illustrated books written by several authors, including Ted van Lieshout, Sjoerd Kuyper and Francine Oomen. He has also illustrated many of his own books.

== Awards ==
- 1997: Vlag en Wimpel, Mijn tuin, mijn tuin (written by Ted van Lieshout)
- 2000: Vlag en Wimpel, Willis
- 2003: Gouden Griffel, Godje
- 2005: Zilveren Griffel, De Noordenwindheks
- 2009: Vlag en Wimpel, Bernie King en de magische cirkels
- 2010: Gouden Griffel, Voordat jij er was
- 2015: Zilveren Griffel, Soms laat ik je even achter
- 2017: Zilveren Griffel, T.rex Trix in Naturalis
- 2018: Vlag en Wimpel, De cycloop
- 2021: Theo Thijssen-prijs, entire oeuvre
