= Tjibbe Veldkamp =

Dutch children's writer (born 1962)

Tjibbe Veldkamp (Dutch pronunciation: [ˈtɕɪbə ˈvɛltkɑmp]; born 19 October 1962) is a Dutch author of children's books.

Veldkamp was born in Groningen and studied psychology at the University of Groningen. He became a scientist. In 1988 someone suggested that he write children's books. It wasn't until he read The Marzipan Piglet by Russel Hoban that he knew he wanted to do something similar. So, in 1990 he turned to writing children's books; his first book, Een ober van niks translated to "A Waiter from Nothing", was published in 1992. He made this in collaboration with illustrator Philip Hopman. He also works with illustrator Kees De Boer.

Since then, he combines writing books with writing for the Dutch Donald Duck magazine. He's also been a full-time writer and translator since 2001.

In 2009 he was awarded a Silver Griffel for Tiffany Dop, and in 2010 he was asked to produce the 2011 Kinderboekenweekgeschenk.

In 2012, he translated Dav Pilkey's Captain Underpants series into Dutch.

In 2024, the book De jongen die van de wereld hield (The Boy Who Loved the World) that Veldkamp created in collaboration with illustrator Mark Janssen was awarded the Woutertje Pieterse Prijs.

Currently Tjibbe Veldkamp lives in Groningen.

== See also ==
- List of publications during the Boekenweek
