= Dolf Verroen =

Dutch writer of children's literature

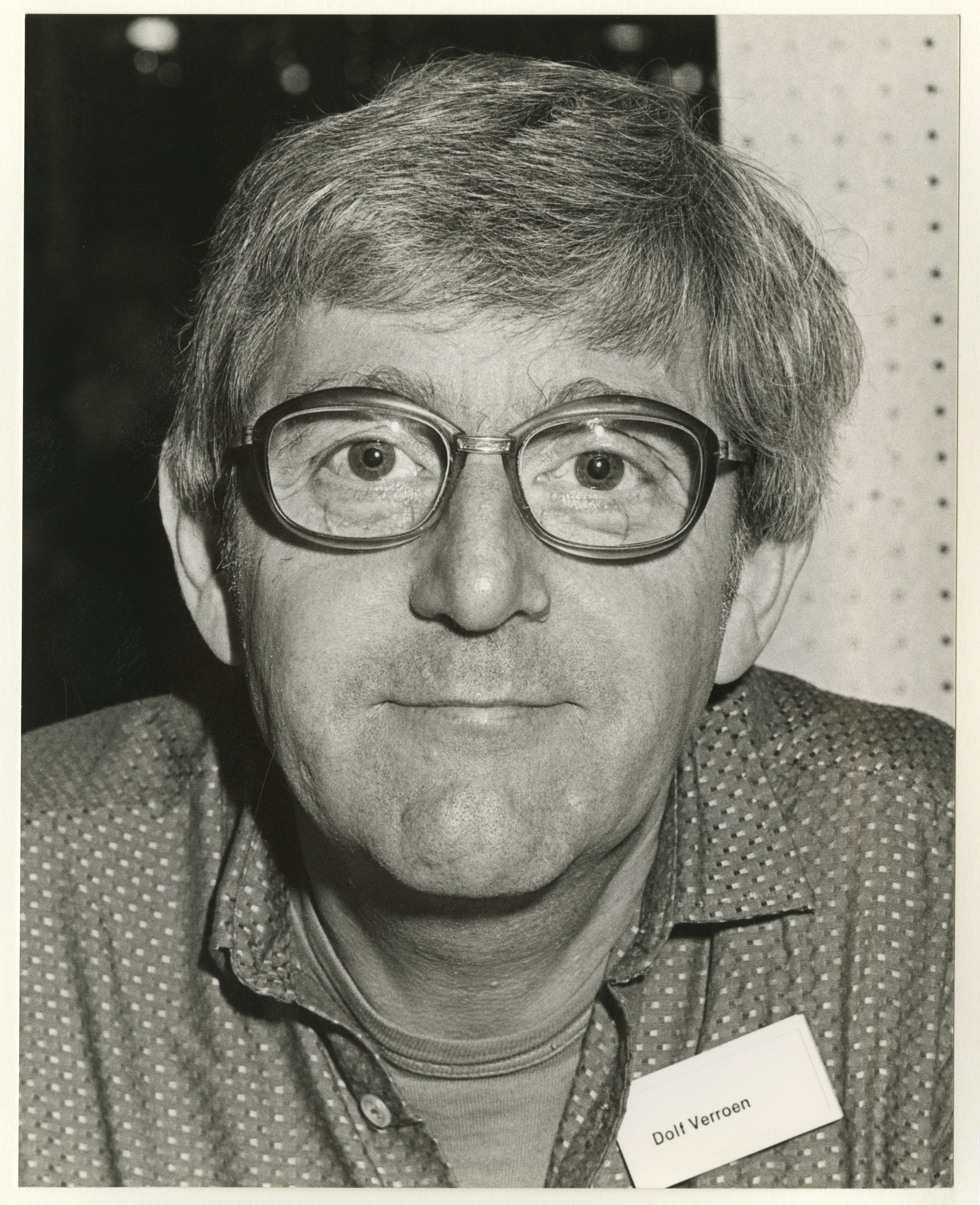
- Dolf Verroen, 1980
- Born: 20 November 1928 (age 96); Delft, Netherlands
- Occupation: Writer
- Notable awards: Zilveren Griffel 1979 1981 1987 2019 2020

Dolf Verroen (born 20 November 1928) is a Dutch writer of children's literature. He won the Zilveren Griffel award five times.

== Career ==
Early in his career, he worked for the newspaper Het Vrije Volk. Verroen made his debut in 1955 with the poetry collection In los verband. His first children's book Het boek van Jan-Kees, later republished as Paarden, van die enge grote, was published in 1958 although he wrote the story originally between age 14 and 15.

He won the Zilveren Griffel award five times: in 1979 for De kat in de gordijnen, in 1981 for Hoe weet jij dat nou?, in 1987 for Een leeuw met lange tanden, in 2019 for Droomopa and in 2020 for Niemand ziet het.

In 2006, he won the Deutscher Jugendliteraturpreis for his book Wie schön weiß ich bin, a German translation of Slaaf Kindje Slaaf by Rolf Erdorf. The book was later republished under the title Hoe mooi wit ik ben with illustrations by Martijn van der Linden. The book is inspired by his journey to Suriname with Miep Diekmann in 1976.

In 1999, he became Ridder in the Order of the Netherlands Lion.

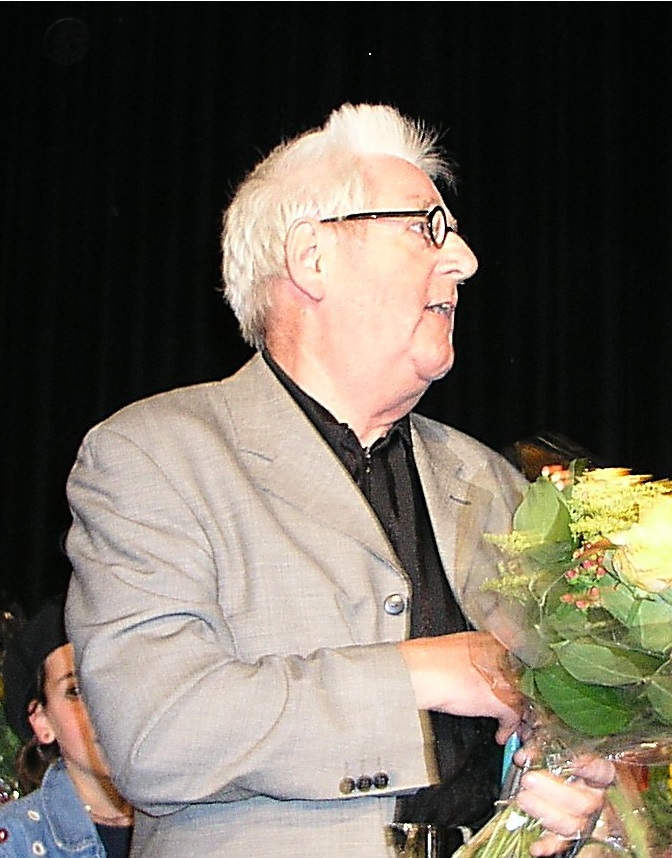
Dolf Verroen (2003)

In 2016, Verroen published Oorlog en vriendschap, the Kinderboekenweekgeschenk, a publication on the occasion of the annual Boekenweek (Dutch Book Week).

Verroen's books have been illustrated by various illustrators, including Jet Boeke, Thé Tjong-Khing and Harrie Geelen.

== Awards ==
- 1979: Zilveren Griffel, De kat in de gordijnen
- 1981: Zilveren Griffel, Hoe weet jij dat nou?
- 1982: Vlag en Wimpel, Juf is gek (with illustrations by Thé Tjong-Khing)
- 1987: Zilveren Griffel, Een leeuw met lange tanden
- 1989: Vlag en Wimpel, De liefste poes van de wereld
- 2006: Deutscher Jugendliteraturpreis, Wie schön weiß ich bin (translated by Rolf Erdorf)
- 2019: Zilveren Griffel, Droomopa
- 2020: Zilveren Griffel, Niemand ziet het
