= Annemarie van Haeringen =

Dutch illustrator (born 1959)

- Born: 16 February 1959 (age 67); Haarlem, Netherlands
- Awards: Gouden Penseel 1999 2000 2005; Max Velthuijs-prijs 2025

Annemarie van Haeringen (born 16 February 1959) is a Dutch illustrator. She won the Gouden Penseel award three times: in 1999, 2000 and 2005. She won the Max Velthuijs-prijs for her entire oeuvre in 2025.

== Career ==
Van Haeringen has illustrated books for numerous Dutch authors, including Tonke Dragt, Ted van Lieshout and Bette Westera.

In 2019, she published the picture book De dag waarop de draak verdween with illustrations made entirely using ballpoint pens. In that same year, the book Laat een boodschap achter in het zand (written by Bibi Dumon Tak) with her illustrations was on the shortlist for the Jan Wolkers Prijs.

In 2023, Van Haeringen and Bibi Dumon Tak won the Woutertje Pieterse Prijs for the book Vandaag houd ik mijn spreekbeurt over de anaconda.

== Selected works ==
Annemarie van Haeringen has published a number of books, including:

- De dag waarop de draak verdween
- Laat een boodschap achter in het zand
- Mijn Mama (in English published by Gecko Press as My Mama)
- Een hapje voor Kleine Ezel, text by Rindert Kromhout (in English published by Gecko Press as Eat Up, Little Donkey)
