= Rindert Kromhout =

Dutch author

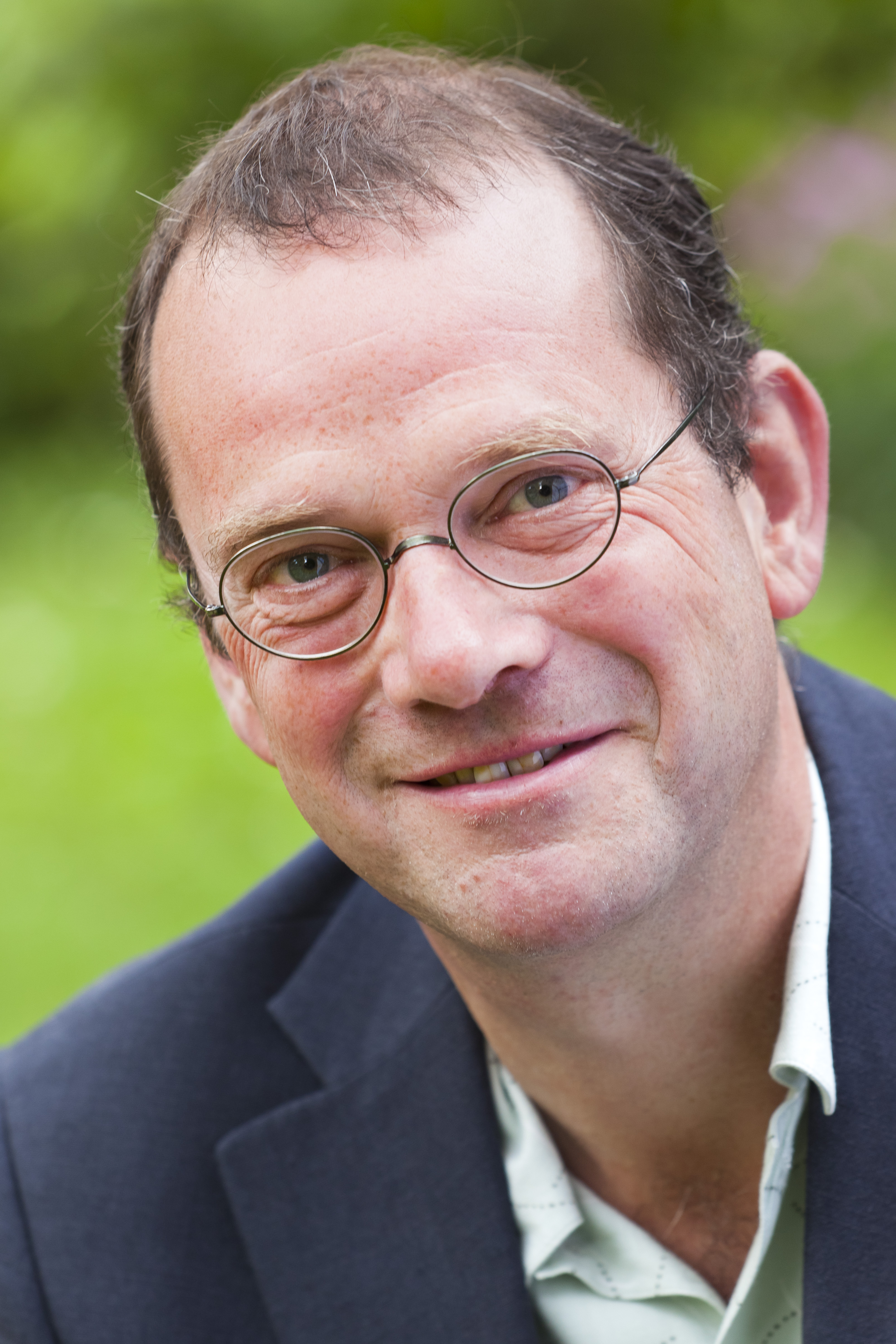
- Born: Rindert Kromhout van der Meer; 9 August 1958; Rotterdam, Netherlands
- Occupation: Author
- Writing career
- Genres: Children's literature, young adult fiction
- Website: www.rindertkromhout.nl

Rindert Kromhout (born 9 August 1958) is a Dutch author of children's books and young adult fiction. He is the author of the 2002 kinderboekenweekgeschenk, a commissioned book given away to book buyers during the annual Boekenweek.

== Biography ==
Kromhout spent part of his childhood in children's homes. He graduated from the MAVO and then attended the Pedagogische academie voor het basisonderwijs, with the intent to teach elementary school. He was more interested in writing, though, and wrote stories and toured with a puppet theater. In 1978 a story of his was published in the Dutch Donald Duck, and two years later he published his first book, Een muis bij het fornuis. In 1982 he became a full-time writer.

In 2011 his Soldaten huilen niet won the inaugural Gouden Lijst, awarded by the Collectieve Propaganda van het Nederlandse Boek for the best Dutch young-adult novel (ages 12–15).

He is partner of agronomist and politician Eric Smaling.
