= Ienne Biemans =

Dutch author (born 1944)

- Born: Angelina Maria Johanna Biemans; 15 August 1944 (age 80)
- Occupation: Writer
- Language: Dutch
- Notable awards: Nienke van Hichtum-prijs 1989; Vlag en Wimpel 1989 2013; Zilveren Griffel 1990

Ienne Biemans (born 15 August 1944) is a Dutch author of children's literature and children's poems.

== Career ==
In 1989, Biemans won the Nienke van Hichtum-prijs for her book Lang zul je leven. She also won a Vlag en Wimpel award that year for this book. In 1990, she won the Zilveren Griffel for her book Ik was de zee. In 2013, she also won a Vlag en Wimpel award for her book Waar was Hans?.

Biemans' books have been illustrated by various illustrators, including Margriet Heymans and Mance Post. Biemans also translated several books into Dutch, including the book Der Mann im Jasmin (1971) by Unica Zürn and Der gefrorene Prinz (1997) by Christine Nöstlinger.

== Publications ==
- 1985: Mĳn naam is Ka. Ik denk dat ik besta (illustrated by Mance Post)
- 1988: Lang zul je leven (illustrated by Mance Post)
- 1989: Ik was de zee (illustrated by Margriet Heymans)
- 1992: Het Akke-Takke-kistje (illustrated by Margriet Heymans)
- 1993: Jetje (illustrated by Margriet Heymans)
- 1993: Koning, Nar en Hartenvrouw (including Imme Dros, Koos Meinderts, Lydia Rood, Veronica Hazelhoff and Harrie Geelen)
- 2001: Met mĳn rechteroog dicht, mĳn linkeroog open (illustrated by Margriet Heymans)
- 2003: Engeltje, bengeltje (illustrated by Alice Hoogstad)
- 2003: Onder de maan (illustrated by Margriet Heymans)
- 2006: Paperasje (illustrated by Jan Jutte)
- 2008: Paperasje ging op reis (illustrated by Jan Jutte)
- 2010: Rosa en de wonderschoenen (illustrated by Ceseli Josephus Jitta)
- 2012: Waar was Hans? (illustrated by Ceseli Josephus Jitta)

== Translations ==
Biemans translated the following books into Dutch:

- 1987: De man in jasmijn (Der Mann im Jasmin, 1971, by Unica Zürn)
- 1991: De bevroren prins (Der gefrorene Prinz, 1997, by Christine Nöstlinger)
- 1992: De twaalf dagen van Kerstmis (The twelve days of Christmas, 1992, by Dorothée Duntze)

== Awards ==
- 1989: Nienke van Hichtum-prijs, Lang zul je leven (illustrated by Mance Post)
- 1989: Vlag en Wimpel, Lang zul je leven
- 1990: Zilveren Griffel, Ik was de zee (illustrated by Margriet Heymans)
- 2013: Vlag en Wimpel, Waar was Hans? (illustrated by Ceseli Josephus Jitta)
