= Biemans =

Biemans is a Dutch surname. Notable people with the surname include:

- Bart Biemans (born 1988), Belgian footballer
- Ienne Biemans (born 1944), Dutch author of children's literature

== See also ==
- Biemann
