= Harry Hargreaves (cartoonist) =

English cartoonist (1922–2004)

- Born: 9 February 1922 Manchester, England
- Died: 12 November 2004 (aged 82)
- Area: Cartoonist
- Notable works: The Bird; Hayseeds
- Spouse: Penny Vickery (m. 1948)

Example of Harry Hargreaves' work.

Harry Hargreaves (9 February 1922, in Manchester – 12 November 2004, in Yeovil, Somerset) was an English cartoonist, best remembered for The Bird, which he produced for Punch, and for Hayseeds in the London Evening News.

== Biography ==
Born the son of a civil servant, Hargreaves was educated at Chorlton High School. Here he produced cartoons for the school magazine at the age of twelve, and two years later his first cartoon was published by the Manchester Evening News. He was a choirboy at Manchester Cathedral in the years 1930–33. When his parents split up he left school at sixteen to work for Lorne & Howarth, an interior design company, studying architecture, mechanical drawing, and furniture design at Manchester School of Art in his spare time. This led to a 1938 position as trainee engineer, for companies which included Rolls-Royce, Ford and Kestrel Engines. 1939 found him working for the Manchester art agency Kayebon Press as assistant to Hugh McNeill on strips like Pansy Potter for The Dandy and The Beano. During World War II he joined the Royal Air Force Volunteer Reserve Signals, began contributing to Blighty, and was posted to India, Ceylon, and Persia.

Following the War Hargreaves worked at Gaumont British as a trainee animator in the period 1946–49. Here he met Penny Vickery, whom he married in 1948, the couple raising two daughters, Penny and Debbie.

The 1950s saw the closing of Gaumont British and his return to freelance strip work in children's comics with his work on Harold Hare and Ollie the Alley Cat in The Sun, Don Quickshot in Knockout Fun Book and Terry the Troubadour in TV Comic.

In 1953 he moved to Amsterdam to work at the studio of Dutch cartoonist Marten Toonder, being involved with the production of Panda, which at that time was syndicated to a hundred and fifty European papers, including the London Evening News. Returning to England in 1954, Hargreaves carried on drawing the strip until 1961.

In 1957 Hargreaves began contributing to Punch, a relationship which would last 17 years. In October 1958 he created The Bird, cartoon strips featuring a small, cheeky, wren-like bird. This was so successful that he was paid a retainer. He also contributed strips to the TV pop show Discs-a-GoGo, which would run them to accompany new pop songs, including "Puff the Magic Dragon".

The year 1968 saw the debut of a daily strip, The Hayseeds, for the London Evening News. It featured talking animals and was based on Walt Kelly's strip Pogo, but not as political. This strip was dropped in 1974 when the London Evening News adopted a tabloid format, but its popularity rescued it and it continued until 1980.

In 1969 Hargreaves designed the Deep Sea Band cereal premiums for Australian plastics company Rosenhain & Lipmann. These were included in boxes of Kellogg's cereal in Australia, the UK, and Japan. Other Hargreaves premiums for R&L and Kellogg's included Camel Train, Tooly Birds, and Fringes, all of which were released on the US market.
