= Schoeters =

Schoeters is a surname of Dutch origin. Notable people with the surname include:

- Gaea Schoeters (born 1976), Belgian author
- Georges Schoeters (1930–1994), Belgian revolutionary
- Jozef Schoeters (1947–1998), Belgian cyclist

== See also ==
- Schoevers
