= Jan Jutte =

Dutch illustrator (born 1953)

- Born: 1 October 1953 (age 72); Arnhem, Netherlands
- Known for: Illustration
- Awards: Gouden Penseel 1994 2001 2004

Jan Jutte (born 1 October 1953) is a Dutch illustrator of children's literature. He received the Gouden Penseel award several times for his work.

== Career ==
Jutte made his debut as an illustrator in 1983 with his illustrations in Annie M. G. Schmidt's book Het Beertje Pippeloentje. In the years that followed Jutte illustrated the books of various Dutch authors, including Toon Tellegen, Guus Kuijer, Edward van de Vendel, Bibi Dumon Tak, Ienne Biemans and Doeschka Meijsing.

In 1993, he illustrated the book Lui Lei Enzo written by Rindert Kromhout. Kromhout won the Zilveren Griffel award and Jutte won the Gouden Penseel award for this book. Jutte also won the Gouden Penseel award in 2001 for his illustrations in the book Tien stoute katjes written by Mensje van Keulen and in 2004 for the book Een muts voor de maan written by Sjoerd Kuyper.

== Awards ==
- 1994: Pluim van de maand, Liselotje op het potje
- 1994: Gouden Penseel, Lui Lei Enzo (written by Rindert Kromhout)
- 2001: Gouden Penseel, Tien stoute katjes (written by Mensje van Keulen)
- 2002: Pluim van de maand, Ruimtereis (April 2002)
- 2004: Gouden Penseel, Een muts voor de maan (written by Sjoerd Kuyper)
