= Woutertje Pieterse Prijs =

Dutch language literary award

- Awarded for: Award for best children's book
- Country: Netherlands
- Reward: €15,000
- First award: 1988

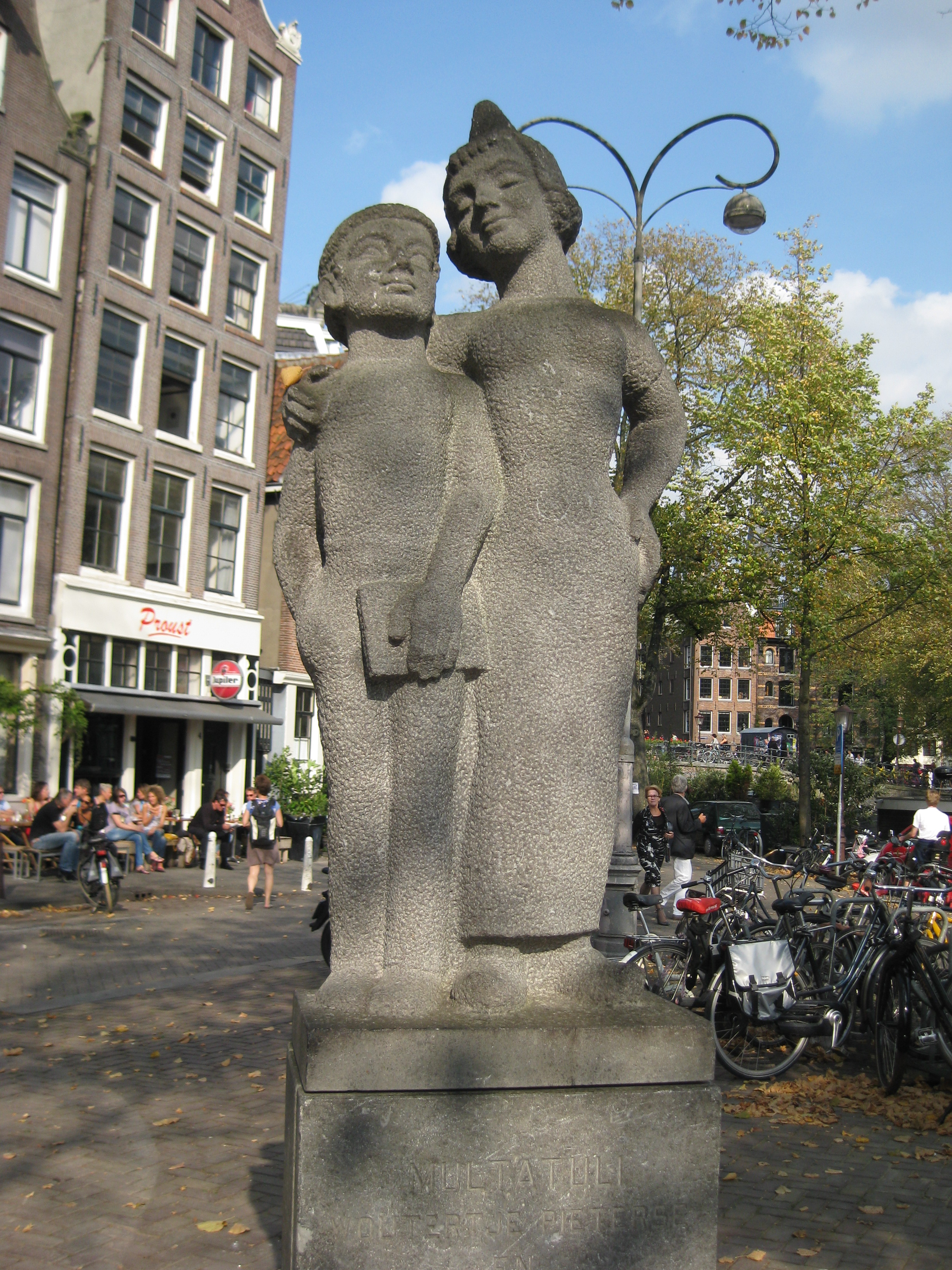
Woutertje Pieterse and Femke (statue by Frits Sieger in Amsterdam)

The Woutertje Pieterse Prijs (Dutch pronunciation: [ˈʋʌutərtɕə ˈpitərse ˈprɛis]; Dutch for Woutertje Pieterse Prize) is an annual Dutch literary award for the best children's book of the preceding year.

== History ==
The award was first given in 1988. The winner of the prize receives €15,000, the highest amount among Dutch literary awards for children's literature. The award is awarded annually in March or April.

The award is named after the character Woutertje Pieterse in Ideeën written by Multatuli. The award's name refers to the character's curiosity and tendency to go against society's morals. Similarly, the Woutertje Pieterse Prijs is awarded to books that differ from children's literature with a didactic or moralistic nature.

Some authors have received the award multiple times, including Toon Tellegen (1992, 1994), Joke van Leeuwen (1997, 1999), and Paul Biegel (1991, 2000). In 2018, Annet Schaap with her book Lampje was the first author to receive this award with a debut novel. Jaap Lamberton is the only person to have received the award posthumously (in 1993).

The prize money has been provided by various organisations over the years, including the Lirafonds and Bruna. The award was sponsored by Lirafonds until 2014 and by Bruna in 2015, 2016 and 2017. The 2018 edition of the award was sponsored using one-off funding. The 2019 and 2020 editions of the award were sponsored by the Brook Foundation and Stichting De Versterking.

== Winners ==
- 1988 - Imme Dros, Annetje Lie in het holst van de nacht
- 1989 - Margriet Heymans, Lieveling, boterbloem
- 1990 - Anne Vegter and Geerten Ten Bosch, De dame en de neushoorn
- 1991 - Paul Biegel, Anderland: een Brandaan mythe
- 1992 - Toon Tellegen, Juffrouw Kachel
- 1993 - Jaap Lamberton (awarded posthumously), Een heel lief konijn, written by Imme Dros
- 1994 - Toon Tellegen, Bijna iedereen kon omvallen
- 1995 - Anne Provoost, Vallen
- 1996 - Anton Quintana, Het boek van Bod Pa
- 1997 - Joke van Leeuwen, Iep!
- 1998 - Wim Hofman, Zwart als inkt
- 1999 - Joke van Leeuwen and Malika Blain, Bezoekjaren
- 2000 - Paul Biegel, Laatste verhalen van de eeuw
- 2001 - Bart Moeyaert, Broere
- 2002 - Peter van Gestel, Winterijs
- 2003 - Guus Kuijer, Ik ben Polleke hoor!
- 2004 - Edward van de Vendel and Fleur van der Weel, Superguppie
- 2005 - Thé Tjong-Khing, Waar is de taart?
- 2006 - Harrie Geelen and Imme Dros, Bijna jarig
- 2007 - Harm de Jonge, Josja Pruis
- 2008 - Hans Hagen, Verkocht
- 2009 - Peter Verhelst and Carll Cneut, Het geheim van de keel van de nachtegaal
- 2010 - Carli Biessels, Juwelen van stras
- 2011 - Benny Lindelauf, De hemel van Heivisj
- 2012 - Ted van Lieshout, Driedelig paard
- 2013 - Kristien Dieltiens, Kelderkind
- 2014 - Marjolijn Hof, De regels van drie
- 2015 - Bette Westera and Sylvia Weve, Doodgewoon
- 2016 - Edward van de Vendel and Martijn van der Linden, Stem op de okapi
- 2017 - Gerda Dendooven, Stella, ster van de zee
- 2018 - Annet Schaap, Lampje
- 2019 - Kathleen Vereecken and Charlotte Peys, Alles komt goed, altijd
- 2020 - Bette Westera and Sylvia Weve, Uit elkaar
- 2021 - Benny Lindelauf and Ludwig Volbeda, Hele verhalen voor een halve soldaat
- 2022 - Raoul Deleo and Noah J. Stern, Terra Ultima
- 2023 - Bibi Dumon Tak and Annemarie van Haeringen, Vandaag houd ik mijn spreekbeurt over de anaconda
- 2024 – Tjibbe Veldkamp and Mark Janssen, De jongen die van de wereld hield
- 2025 – Ludwig Volbeda, Oever
- 2026 – Bart Moeyaert and Mark Janssen, Atman!
