= De Boon =

Flemish literary award established in 2022

- Awarded for: Best book originally written in Dutch
- Sponsored by: Flemish Government
- Reward: 50.000 EUR
- First award: 2022; 4 years ago
- Website: www.deboon.be

De Boon is a Flemish annual literary award for the best Dutch-language books published in Flanders and the Netherlands. The award was established in 2022 and awarded by the Flemish Government. It is awarded annually for two categories: one Boon for fiction and non-fiction and one Boon for children's and youth literature.

A jury of expert first puts together a longlist with 15 titles per category, followed by a shortlist of five titles and finally one winner. Laureates are awarded with €50.000 and a custom-made ring. Additionally, there is an audience award of €5.000 for both categories, which may overlap with the jury choice.

The award is named after Belgian author Louis Paul Boon. The goal of the award it to increase the visibility of literature in Flanders, recognise writers and illustrators and increase the reading, lending and buying of books.

== List of laureates ==
=== Fiction and non-fiction ===
Year	Fiction and non-fiction	Audience award fiction and non-fiction	Reference
2022	Mijn lieve gunsteling - Marieke Lucas Rijneveld	Mijn lieve gunsteling - Marieke Lucas Rijneveld	
2023	Wat we toen al wisten: de vergeten groene geschiedenis van 1972 - Geert Buelens	De draaischijf - Tom Lanoye	
2024	Alkibiades - Ilja Leonard Pfeijffer	Alkibiades - Ilja Leonard Pfeijffer	
2025	Oroppa - Safae el Khannoussi	De levens van Claus - Mark Schaevers	
2026	Grondwerk - Tijl Nuyts	Het geschenk - Gaea Schoeters	

=== Children's and youth literature ===
Year	Children's and youth literature	Audience award Children's and youth literature	Reference
2022	Een zee van liefde - Pieter Gaudesaboos	Een zee van liefde - Pieter Gaudesaboos	
2023	Misjka - Edward van de Vendel, Anoush Elman and Annet Schaap	Morris - Bart Moeyaert and Sebastiaan Van Doninck	
2024	Neem nooit een beste vriend - Erna Sassen and Martijn van der Linden	Kijk dan toch! - Elvis Peeters and Sebastiaan Van Doninck	
2025	Wat ons nog rest - Aline Sax	Het grote kippenboek - Evelien De Vlieger and Jan Hamstra	
2026	De vrouw en zijn hoofd - Benny Lindelauf and Ingrid Godon	Krekel - Annet Schaap	
