= Jan Geurt Gaarlandt =

Dutch writer (born 1946)

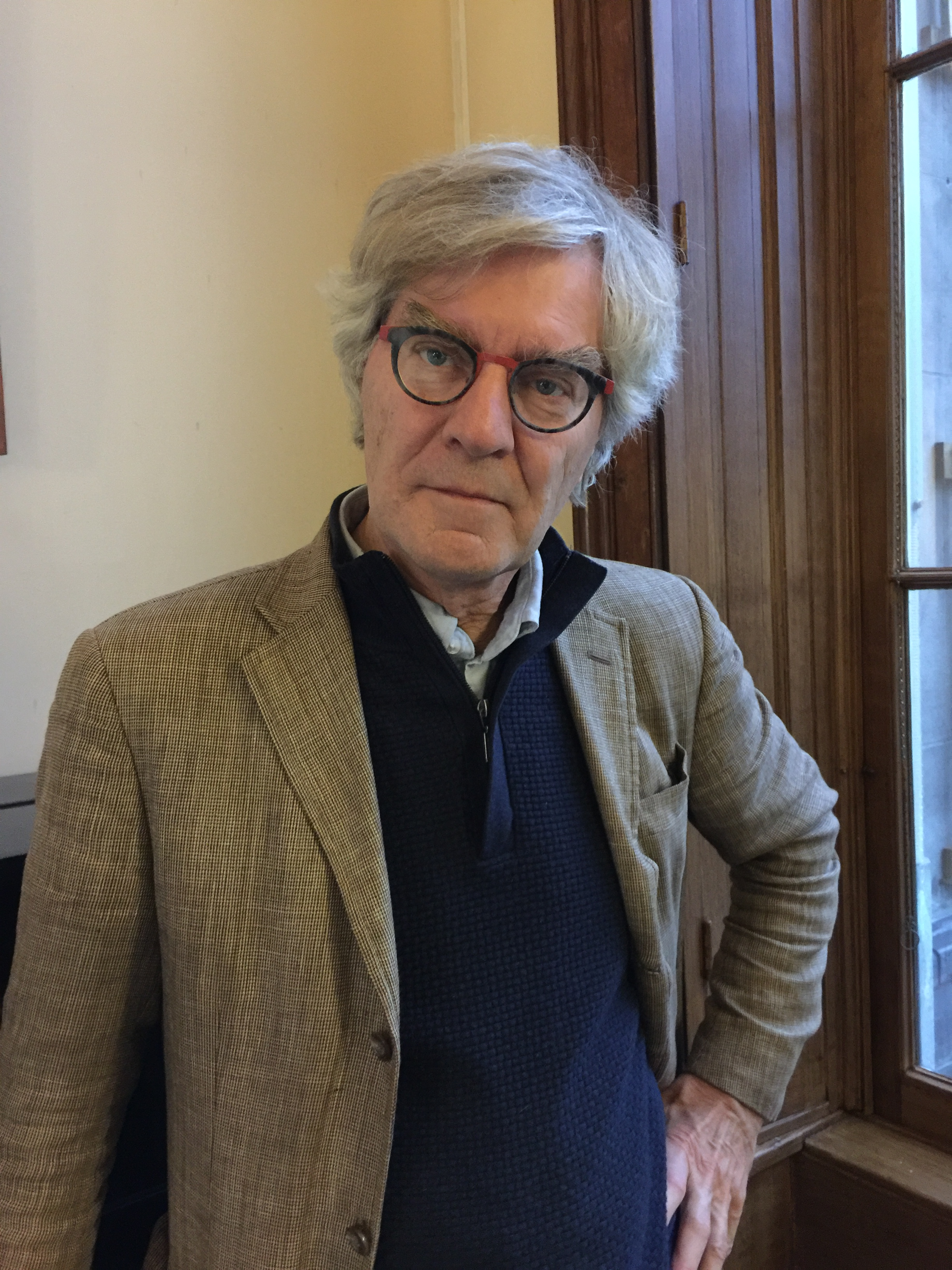
- J.G. Gaarlandt (2019)
- Born: October 9, 1946 (age 79)
- Citizenship: Dutch
- Education: University of Leiden
- Spouse: Françoise Kist
- Writing career
- Pen name: Otto de Kat
- Language: Dutch
- Notable works: Julia, News From Berlin
- Notable awards: Halewijn prize for literature (2005)
- Website: www.ottodekat.nl

Jan Geurt Gaarlandt (born October 9, 1946) is a Dutch journalist, poet, translator, editor and novelist. He writes novels under the pseudonym Otto de Kat.

== Biography ==
Gaarlandt was born in Rotterdam on October 9, 1946, to the son of Hans Gaarlandt and Anna Wilhelmina Gaarlandt Hupkes. He is a grandson of Egbertus Gerrit Gaarlandt, a mayor of Gouda, and Hermina Johanna Maria de Kat. In 1977, he married Françoise Kist, with whom he has a son and a daughter.

Gaarlandt studied theology at the University of Leiden, following which he took up studies in art criticism, completing a thesis on the art theory of the German philosopher Martin Heidegger. An article on Van Geel, published in the journal Raam attracted attention, and he was invited by the de Volkskrant newspaper to write reviews for them. In 1995, Gaarlandt became the Lord of the Manor of Barendrecht, a purely honorary position without any role of governance. The hereditary title belonged to his uncle, after whose death, he purchased it for 10,000 guilders. Previously, Gaarlandt has also been Mayor of Emmen and a Queen's Commissioner in Drente.

== Career ==
Gaarlandt's early career was as a reviewer of theological works for the de Volkskrant and the Vrij Nederland magazine between 1973-1979, following which he was assigned more and more literary criticism. Over time, he began to lose interest in reviewing Dutch literature. He said, "My frustration with the quality of the Dutch literature increased more and more. My pieces were increasingly acidic and cynical." He responded to an advertisement for an editorship at De Haan and started work there in 1977. One of his early successes was his discovery of the war diaries of Etty Hillesum in 1981. The diaries described Hillesum's experiences at the Westerbork transit camp. He edited several volumes of the diaries. Subsequently, he was an editor for the ten volume Modern Encyclopedia of World Literature. He also began to translate books from German.

In 1986, Gaarlandt founded the non-fiction imprint Balans, which later merged with De Bezige Bij. Balans became established following the successful publication of Hillesum's books; another popular work was the newly translated Bible by Nico ter Linden. The publishing house was also instrumental in establishing biography as a popular genre in the Netherlands, with the issue of a series of books on Queen Wilhelmina, Hendrikus Colijn, Henriette Roland Holst, and Herman Gorter.

Gaarlandt's first book The Ironic Charter, published in 1975, was a collection of poetry. His first novel, The Figure in the Distance, was published in 1998 under the pseudonym Otto de Kat. The pseudonym derived from a distant relative of Gaarlandt's, the painter Otto B. de Kat. His second novel, Man on the Move came out in 2002, while his third, Julia was published in 2008. His 2012 novel News from Berlin was made into a film by Ben Verbong based on a screenplay by Toenke Berkelbach.

Translations of Gaarlandt's books have appeared in German, French, Italian and English.

== Selected bibliography ==
=== Poetry ===
- 1975 - Het ironisch handvest, Amsterdam: Van Oorschot

=== Novels ===
- 1998 - Man in de verte (English translation by Arnold Pomerans and Erica Pomerans: The Figure In The Distance. Harvill. 2002. ISBN 978-1-86046-882-7.)
- 2004 - De inscheper (English translation by Sam Garrett: Man on the Move. Quercus. 2010. ISBN 978-1-84916-806-9.)
- 2008 - Julia (English translation by Ina Rilke: Julia. Maclehose Press, Quercus. 2011. ISBN 978-0-85705-055-7.)
- 2012 - Bericht uit Berlijn (English translation by Ina Rilke: News from Berlin. Quercus. 2 January 2014. ISBN 978-1-84866-233-9.)

=== Edited works ===
- 1984 - An Interrupted Life: The Diaries and Letters of Etty Hillesum, 1941-1943 (English translation by Arnold Pomerans, Pantheon Books)
- 1989 - Men zou een pleister op vele wonden willen zijn (Collected essays on Etty Hillesum)

== Awards and recognition ==
Gaarlandt served as a juror for the Multatuli prize in 1977, and for the Laurens Janszoon Coster prize in 1997.

In 2005, Gaarlandt received the Halewijn prize for literature.
