= Jaap Lamberton =

Dutch illustrator

- Born: 1941 or 1946
- Died: 1991
- Known for: Illustration

Jaap Lamberton (1941 or 1946 - 1991) was a Dutch illustrator of comics and children's literature.

== Career ==
Lamberton collaborated with Harrie Geelen on commercials and animated cartoons. He was one of the last remaining artists to work at the comics department of Toonder Studios by Marten Toonder, together with Richard Klokkers and Frits Godhelp. He also illustrated the Panda comic strip series with stories written by Harrie Geelen and Ruud Straatman.

He was production coordinator for the animated feature film The Dragon That Wasn't (Or Was He?).

In 1993, he was posthumously awarded the Woutertje Pieterse Prijs for illustrating Een heel lief konijn, written by Imme Dros.
