= My Extraordinary Summer with Tess =

2019 film

- Film poster
- Dutch: Mijn bijzonder rare week met Tess
- Directed by: Steven Wouterlood
- Starring: Sonny Coops Van Utteren; Josephine Arendsen; Tjebbo Gerritsma; Jennifer Hoffman
- Music by: Franziska Henke
- Distributed by: September Film
- Release dates: 7 February 2019 (Berlin); 3 July 2019 (Netherlands)
- Running time: 82 minutes
- Countries: Netherlands; Germany
- Languages: Dutch; German
- Box office: $79,893

My Extraordinary Summer with Tess (Dutch: Mijn bijzonder rare week met Tess) is a 2019 Dutch-German comedy-drama film directed by Steven Wouterlood. It is based on the book of the same name by Anna Woltz.

The film won the Grand Prize Feature Film Award at the New York International Children's Film Festival in 2019. It also won awards at the Berlin International Film Festival and the KinoKino International Film Festival. In July 2019, it was shortlisted as one of the nine films in contention to be the Dutch entry for the Academy Award for Best International Feature Film at the 92nd Academy Awards but it was not selected.

== Cast ==
- Sonny Coops Van Utteren as Sam
- Josephine Arendsen as Tess
- Tjebbo Gerritsma as the father of Sam
- Jennifer Hoffman as Ida(the mother of Tess)
