= Maatstaf =

Dutch literary magazine

Maatstaf was a Dutch literary magazine, founded in 1953 by Bert Bakker. Bakker, who was the magazine's first editor, is credited with bringing in poets such as Ida Gerhardt. The magazine had a reputation for publishing "realist" authors (such as Maarten 't Hart), and was categorized as "neoromantic," one of a number of Dutch literary magazines in an "anti-experimental tradition." Dutch poet Gerrit Komrij, who edited the magazine from 1969 on, was the subject of a themed issue in 1984, and again in 1996, this last time centered on a collection of ten homo-erotic poems he had published in 1978, Capriccio. In that same year, 1996, the magazine, with a new team of editors, was renewed following a "conservative revolution."

Maatstaf was a leading magazine for Dutch poetry until the 1970s, when it was supplanted by magazines such as De Revisor and Raster. In 1999, De Arbeiderspers ceased its publication.

== Editors ==
- Gerrit Komrij (1969 - ?)
- Mensje van Keulen (1972 - 1980)
