= Sonia Garmers =

Writer from Curaçao (1933–2025)

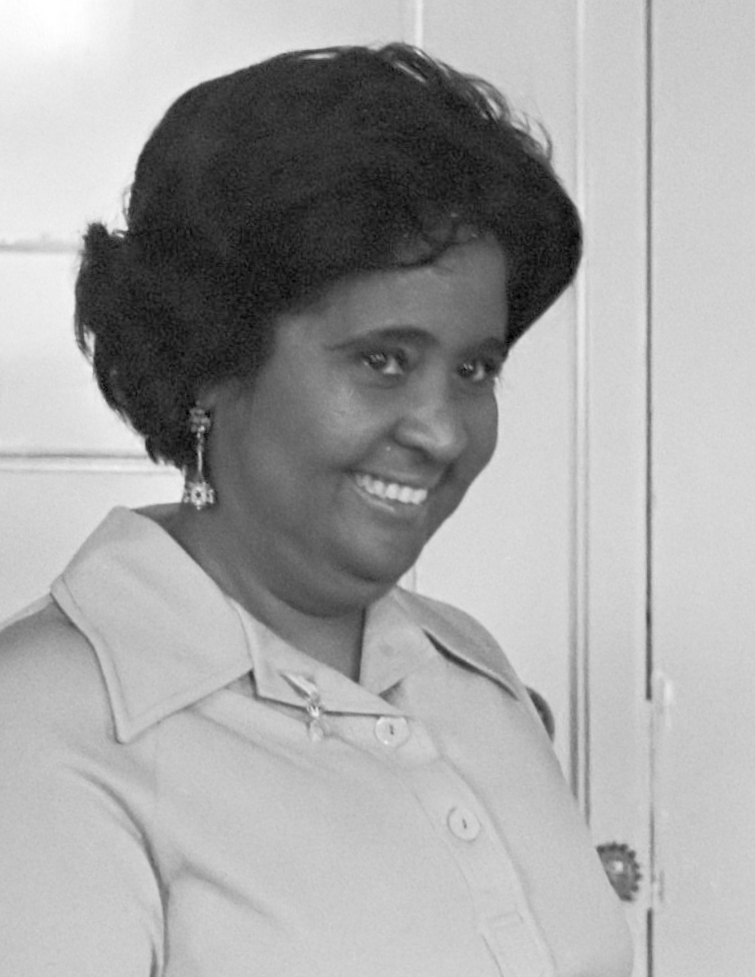
- Sonia Garmers (1976)
- Born: 9 January 1933 Colony of Curaçao and Dependencies
- Died: 18 March 2025 (aged 92)
- Notable awards: Nienke van Hichtum-prijs 1981

Sonia Garmers (9 January 1933 – 18 March 2025) was a writer from Curaçao.

== Life and career ==
Garmers wrote various books both in Papiamento and in Dutch. Garmers published her first book in Papiamento in 1955. Her first book written in Dutch Lieve koningin, hierbij stuur ik U mijn dochter ("Dear Queen, I hereby send you my daughter") was published in 1976. This book addresses Juliana of the Netherlands, who was Queen of the Netherlands at the time, with regard to Garmers sending each of her four daughters to the Netherlands for study. This, coincidentally, is the same number of daughters as Juliana. Juliana also received a copy of the book.

Garmers first met Miep Diekmann in 1958. Diekmann started coaching Garmers and taught her, among other things, how to best structure a book. Diekmann coached Garmers when she was writing her first Dutch book Lieve koningin, hierbij stuur ik U mijn dochter (1976).

In 1973, she published a collection of poems in collaboration with Nydia Ecury and Mila Palm.

In 1981, she won the Nienke van Hichtum-prijs for her book Orkaan en Mayra (1980). The book is a sequel to her first Dutch language children's book Orkaan which was published in 1977 and illustrated by Thé Tjong-Khing.

In 1983, she won the Cola Debrotprijs for her contributions to literature.

Garmers died on 18 March 2025, at the age of 92.

== Awards ==
- 1981: Nienke van Hichtum-prijs, Orkaan en Mayra
- 1983: Cola Debrotprijs
