= Benny Lindelauf =

Dutch writer of children's literature

- Born: 15 December 1964 (age 61) Sittard, Netherlands
- Occupation: Writer
- Language: Dutch
- Notable awards: Thea Beckmanprijs 2004; Nienke van Hichtum-prijs 2011; Woutertje Pieterse Prijs 2011

Benny Lindelauf (born 15 December 1964) is a Dutch writer of children's literature.

== Career ==
Lindelauf made his debut in 1998 with the book Omhoogvaldag, a collection of sixteen short stories. Lindelauf has written various stories for children's magazines Okki and Taptoe.

He received the Thea Beckmanprijs in 2004 for his book Negen open armen. For this book he also received the Gouden Zoen award in 2005. In 2011, he won the Nienke van Hichtum-prijs for his book De hemel van Heivisj. In the same year he also won the Dioraphte Jongerenliteratuur Prijs and the Woutertje Pieterse Prijs for this book. In 2017, he received the Gouden Lijst award for his book Hoe Tortot zijn vissenhart verloor.

Lindelauf's books have been illustrated by various illustrators including Karina Mucek, Wilbert van der Steen and Martijn van der Linden.

== Awards ==
- 2004: Thea Beckmanprijs, Negen open armen
- 2005: Gouden Zoen, Negen open armen
- 2011: Nienke van Hichtum-prijs, De hemel van Heivisj
- 2011: Woutertje Pieterse Prijs, De hemel van Heivisj
- 2011: Dioraphte Jongerenliteratuur Prijs, De hemel van Heivisj
- 2017: Gouden Lijst, Hoe Tortot zijn vissenhart verloor
- 2021: Woutertje Pieterse Prijs, Hele verhalen voor een halve soldaat (with Ludwig Volbeda)
- 2026: Boon for Children's and youth literature, De vrouw en zijn hoofd (with Ingrid Godon)
