= Bert Bakker =

Dutch writer and publisher (1912–1969)

Bert Bakker (May 1954)

Lambertus Jozef (Bert) Bakker (3 April 1912 in Huizum (Leeuwarden) – 19 September 1969 in Ilpendam) was a Dutch writer and publisher in the Netherlands. He wrote literary studies, two novels, poetry, and children's books. In World War II he was involved in the Dutch Resistance and assisted in the (illegal at the time) publication of Vrij Nederland. After the war he founded a publishing company under his own name; his nephew, also named Bert Bakker, ran the company until 1993. In 1953 he founded the literary magazine Maatstaf, which he edited until 1969. He (along with fellow publisher Geert van Oorschot) was described as a "living legend" in the Dutch publishing industry, having supported and published authors such as Adriaan Roland Holst, Martinus Nijhoff, Gerrit Achterberg, and Neeltje Maria Min.

== Books ==
- Au revoir (1934, poetry)
- De spannende zomer van Botte Spoelstra (1935, children's book)
- Drijfzand (1935, novel)
- Een held op sokken (1935, children's book)
- Reizigers (1935)
- Sjefs eerste luchtreis (1935, children's book)
- Ieder is alleen (1937, novel)
- A. Roland Holst (1958)
- S. Vestdijk (1958)
- J. Slauerhoff (1961)
- Pierre Kemp (1961)
- Anna Blaman (1966)
