= Nienke van Hichtum-prijs =

Dutch literary award

- Awarded for: Award for best children's book
- Country: Netherlands
- Presented by: Jan Campert foundation, Literature Museum
- Reward: €6,000
- First award: 1964
- Website: https://literatuurmuseum.nl/literatuurprijzen/nienke-van-hichtum-prijs

The Nienke van Hichtum-prijs (Dutch for Nienke van Hichtum Prize) is a biennial Dutch literary award for children's literature awarded by the Jan Campert-Stichting. The award is named after children's author Nienke van Hichtum and was first awarded in 1964. The winner of the prize receives €6,000.

Annet Schaap with her book Lampje is the first author to have received this award with a debut novel.

== Winners ==
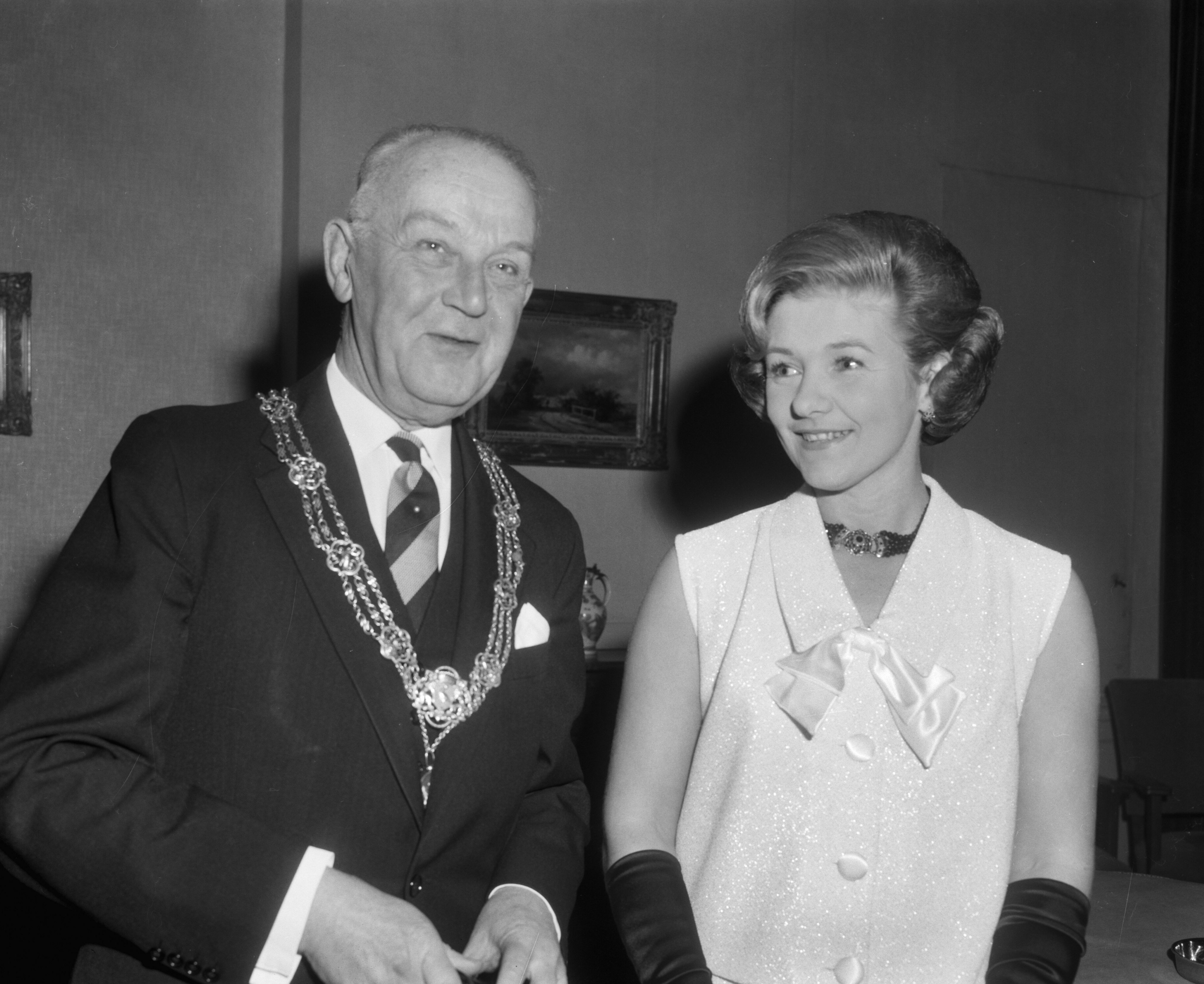
Gertie Evenhuis (1964 award)

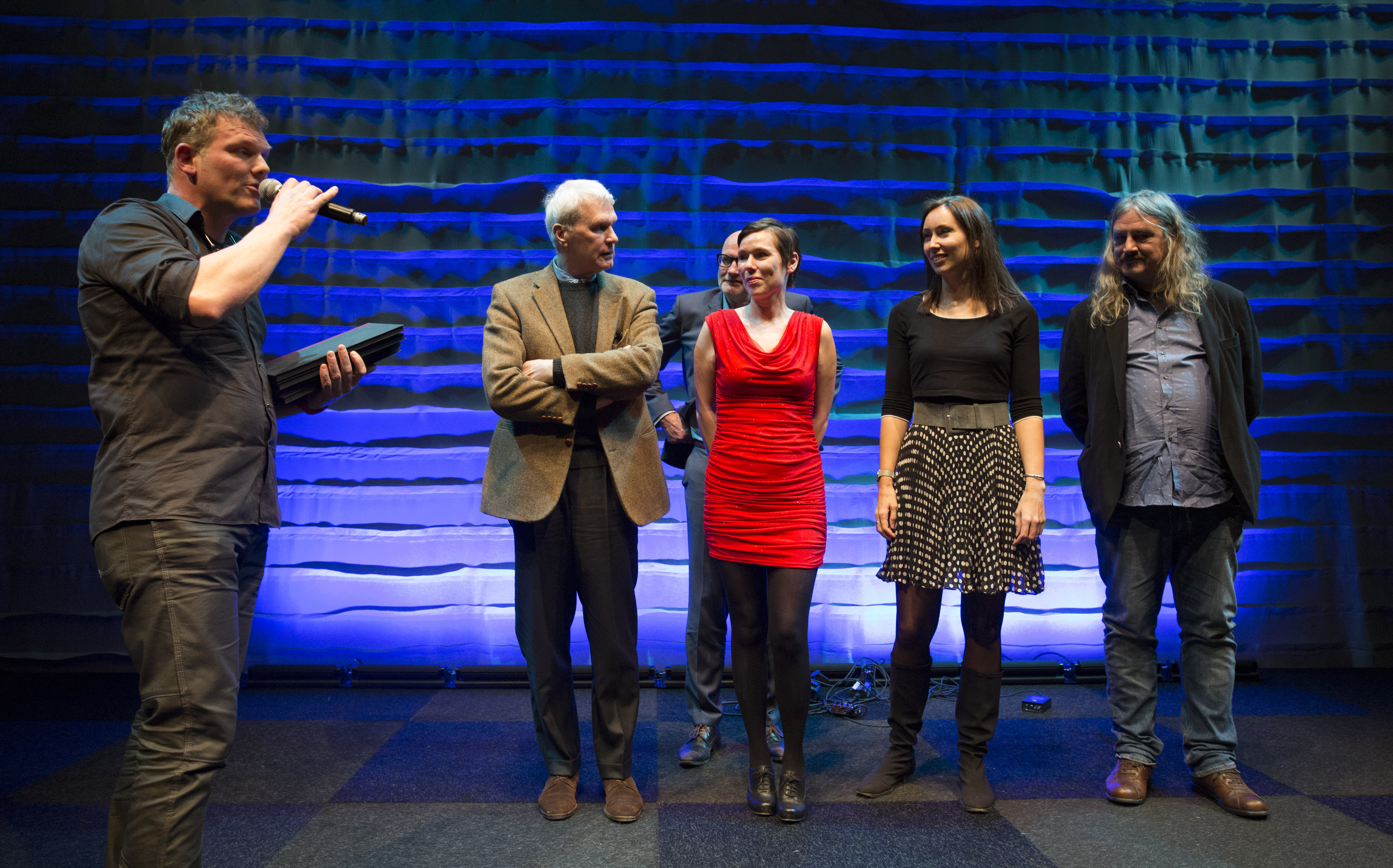
Anna Woltz (2015 award)

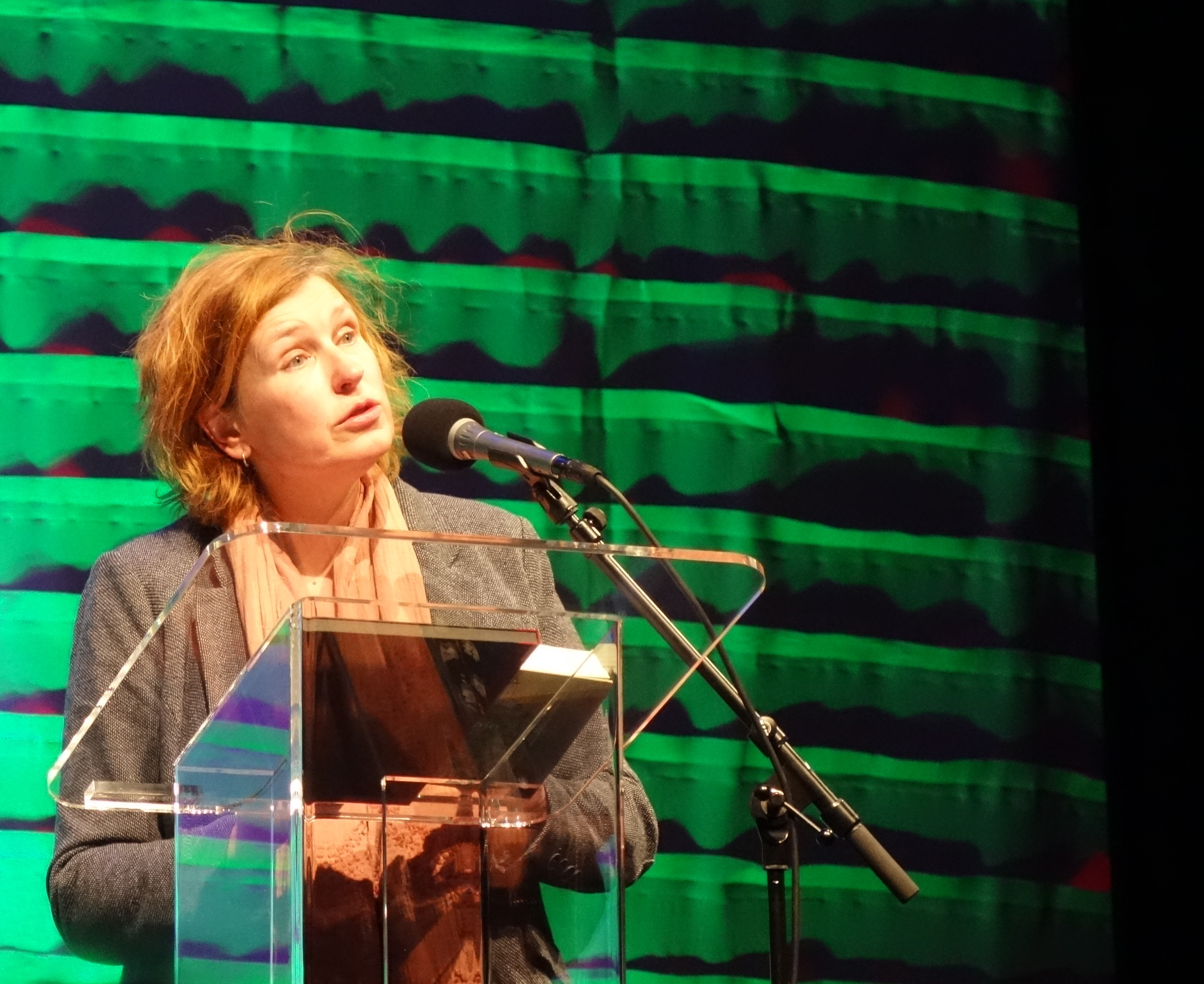
Annet Schaap (2017 award)

- 1964 - Gertie Evenhuis, Wij waren er ook bij
- 1971 - Tonke Dragt, Torenhoog en mijlenbreed
- 1972 - Jaap ter Haar, Geschiedenis van de Lage Landen
- 1973 - Paul Biegel, De twaalf rovers
- 1975 - Miep Diekmann, Dan ben je nergens meer
- 1977 - Wim Hofman, Wim
- 1979 - Henk Barnard, Laatste nacht in Jeque
- 1981 - Sonia Garmers, Orkaan en Mayra
- 1983 - Imme Dros, En een tijd van vrede
- 1985 - Willem Wilmink, Het verkeerde pannetje
- 1987 - Peter van Gestel, Ko Kruier en zijn stadsgenoten
- 1989 - Ienne Biemans, Lang zul je leven
- 1991 - Mensje van Keulen, Vrienden van de maan
- 1993 - Margriet Heymans and Annemie Heymans, De prinses van de moestuin
- 1995 - Veronica Hazelhoff, Veren
- 1997 - Rita Verschuur, Vreemd land
- 1999 - Eva Gerlach, Hee meneer Eland
- 2001 - Ted van Lieshout, Zeer kleine liefde
- 2003 - Peter van Gestel, Winterijs
- 2005 - Bart Moeyaert, Dani Bennoni
- 2007 - Margriet Heymans, Diep in het bos van Nergena
- 2009 - Els Beerten, Allemaal willen we de hemel
- 2011 - Benny Lindelauf, De hemel van Heivisj
- 2013 - Jan Paul Schutten, Het raadsel van alles wat leeft
- 2015 - Anna Woltz, Honderd uur nacht
- 2017 - Annet Schaap, Lampje
- 2019 - Gideon Samson, Zeb.
- 2021 - Erna Sassen, Zonder titel
- 2023 - Tjibbe Veldkamp, De jongen die van de wereld hield
- 2025 - Jowi Schmitz, Kip op je kop
