= Margriet Heymans =

Dutch writer and illustrator of children's literature (1932–2023)

Margiet Heymans
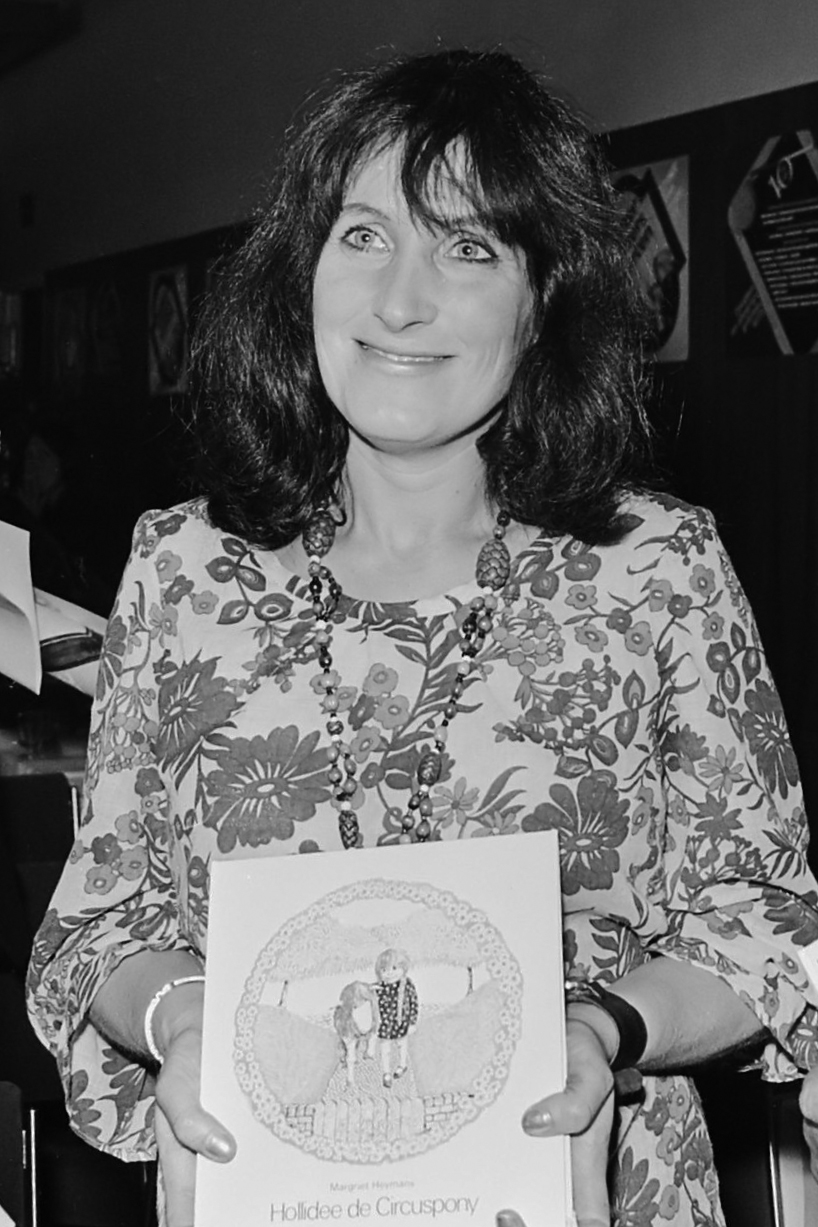
- Heymans in 1973
- Born: Margaretha Henrica Gerardus Maria Heijmans; 29 October 1932 's-Hertogenbosch, Netherlands
- Died: 27 July 2023 (aged 90) 's-Hertogenbosch, Netherlands
- Occupations: Writer, illustrator
- Children: 5
- Writing career
- Genre: Children's literature

Margaretha Henrica Gerardus Maria Heijmans (29 October 1932 – 27 July 2023) was a Dutch writer and illustrator of children's literature.

Heymans wrote and illustrated various books in collaboration with her sister Annemie Heymans, including Het poppenfeest (1971), De gele draad (1982), Adam Wortel krijgt bezoek (1986) and De prinses van de moestuin (1991).

== Early life ==
Heymans was born on 29 October 1932, in 's-Hertogenbosch, Netherlands. After attending a gymnasium Heymans studied for two years at the School voor Kunst en Kunstnijverheid in 's-Hertogenbosch. She then moved to Amsterdam to study at the Rijksakademie van beeldende kunsten.

== Career ==
Heymans first published in 1958 in children's magazine Kris Kras.

Heymans illustrated various books written by Dutch authors, including Annetje Lie in het holst van de nacht by Imme Dros and Ik was de zee by Ienne Biemans. Heymans received the Gouden Penseel award for her illustrations in Annetje Lie in het holst van de nacht and Heymans stated in 2013 that she considers this book to be the most beautiful story by another author that she has ever illustrated. Dros received a Zilveren Griffel award and the very first Woutertje Pieterse Prijs for this book.

Heymans lectured in illustration at the Koninklijke Academie voor Kunst en Vormgeving from 1972 till 1993.

Her collaborations with her sister Annemie have been exhibited in Paris in 1981 and in Voorhout in 1984. In 2018, Heymans donated her original illustrations to the Dutch Museum of Literature in The Hague. In 2020, some of her illustrations for Annie M. G. Schmidt's books appeared in an online exhibition by the same museum. The exhibition was held to mark the 25th anniversary of Schmidt's death.

== Personal life and death ==
Margriet Heymans married twice and had five children.

She died on 27 July 2023, at the age of 90.

== Publications ==
- Het poppenfeest (1971)
- Hollidee de circuspony (1972)
- Kattekwaad en popperommel (1975)
- De gele draad (1982)
- Ik ben Jantje en ik kan al lezen (1982)
- Mijn muis wil een boek (1982)
- Moe vist een bel op (1982)
- Wie ziek is, wil geen kaas (1982)
- Jipsloop (1984)
- Adam Wortel krijgt bezoek (1986)
- Lieveling, boterbloem (1988)
- Ik wil naar huis! (1989)
- Wie heeft er mijn broertje gezien? (1990)
- De prinses van de moestuin (1991)
- Goede raad kan geen kwaad (1992)
- Riet op de mat (1992)
- De wezen van woesteland (1997)
- Dora, of De tante van de trollen (1999)

== Awards ==
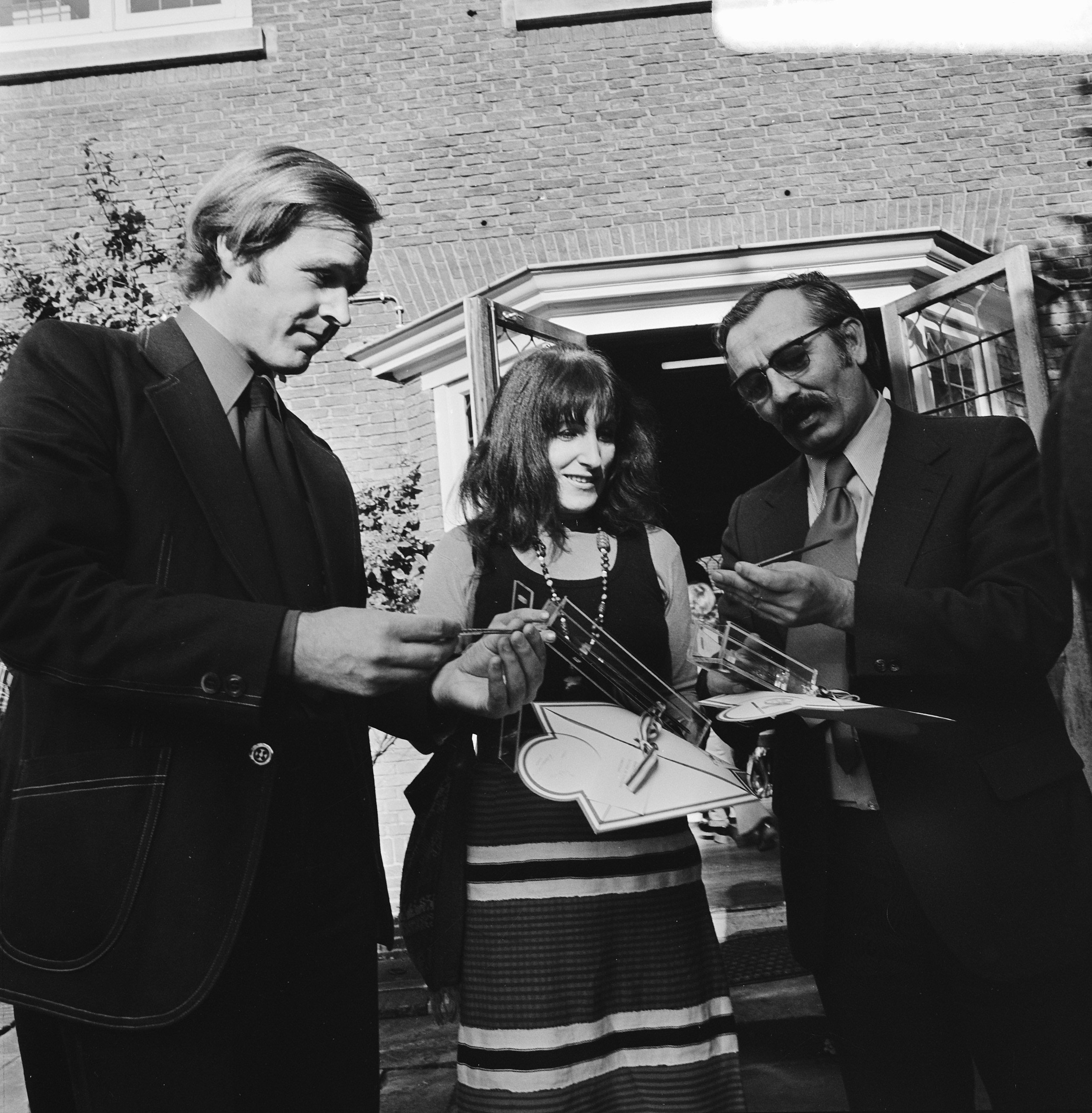
Jan Terlouw, Margriet Heymans and Henk Barnard receiving an award in 1973.

Heymans received numerous awards for her work:

- Gouden Penseel (1973, for Hollidee de circuspony)
- Zilveren Penseel (1985, for Jipsloop)
- Gouden Penseel (1988, for Annetje Lie in het holst van de nacht written by Imme Dros)
- Zilveren Griffel (1989, for Lieveling, boterbloem)
- Woutertje Pieterse Prijs (1989, for Lieveling, boterbloem)
- Zilveren Griffel (1992, for De prinses van de moestuin)
- Nienke van Hichtum-prijs (1993, for De prinses van de moestuin)
- Gouden Penseel (1998, for De wezen van Woesteland)
- Nienke van Hichtum-prijs (2007, for Diep in het bos van Nergena)
