= Anna Woltz =

Dutch writer (born 1981)

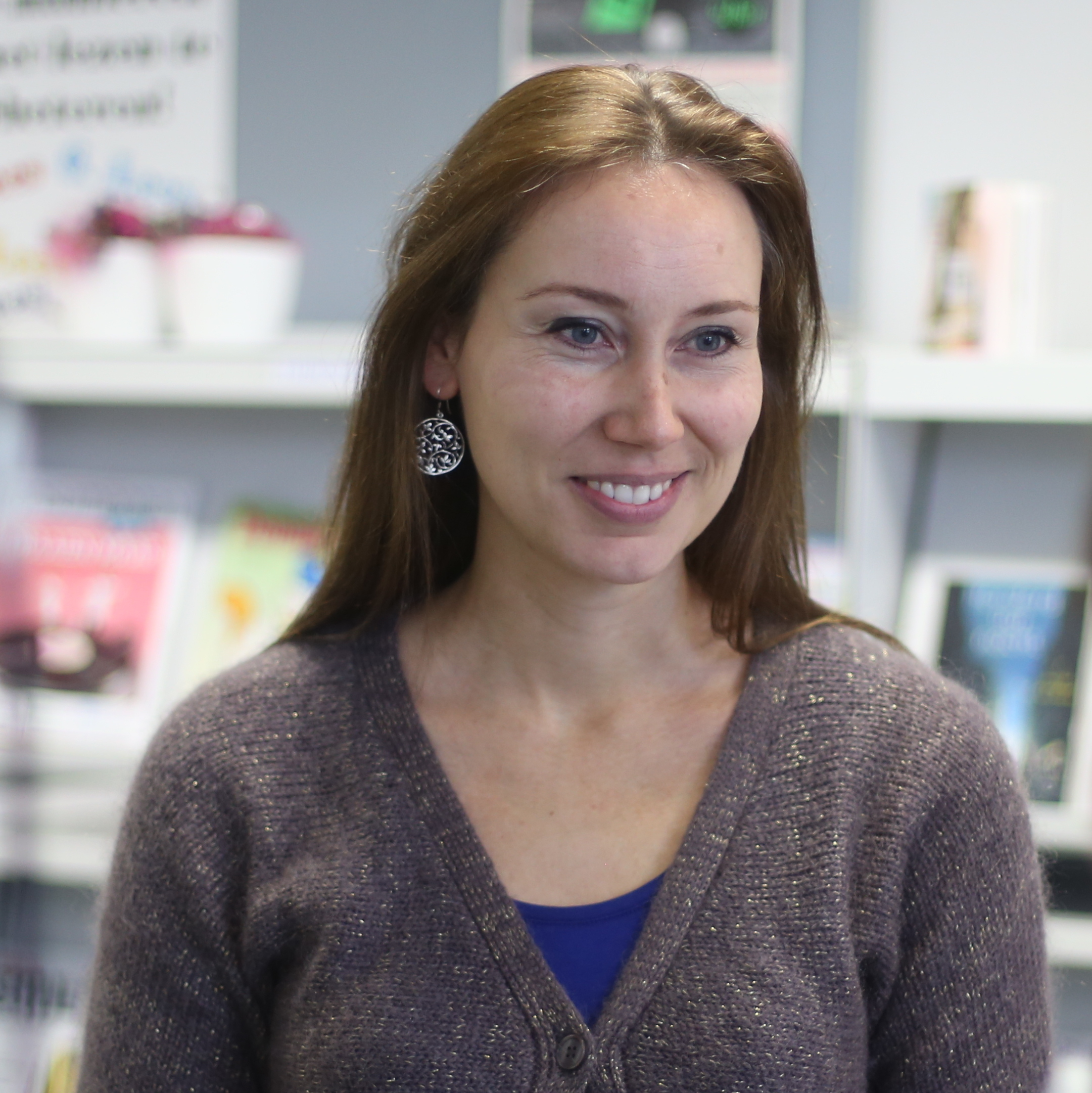
- Anna Woltz (2017)
- Born: 29 December 1981 (age 43)
- Notable awards: Nienke van Hichtum-prijs 2015; Gouden Griffel 2016; Zilveren Griffel 2017

Anna Woltz (born 29 December 1981) is a Dutch writer of children's literature.

== Early life ==
Woltz was born in 1981 in London, United Kingdom. Her father is Wout Woltz who was the editor-in-chief of NRC Handelsblad between 1983 and 1989.

== Career ==
In 2006, Woltz co-authored the book Post uit de oorlog with her father based on his experiences during World War II.

In 2015, Woltz received the Nienke van Hichtum-prijs for her children's book Honderd uur nacht (2014), a story inspired by Woltz's time in New York City when Hurricane Sandy struck the city. A year later, Woltz received the Gouden Griffel award for her book Gips (2015). Woltz also received the Zilveren Griffel award in 2016 for Gips and in 2017 she received the same award for her book Alaska.

Her book Mijn bijzonder rare week met Tess (2013) was awarded the Thea Beckmanprijs and in 2019 it was adapted to film by Steven Wouterlood. The film adaptation, internationally titled My Extraordinary Summer with Tess, won the Grand Prize Feature Film Award at the 2019 New York International Children's Film Festival.

In 2022, her book De tunnel was nominated for the Flemish literary award Boon in the category children's literature.

Woltz was also the author of Haaientanden, the Kinderboekenweekgeschenk published during the Kinderboekenweek of 2019.

== Personal life ==
She studied history in Leiden, Netherlands.

== Awards ==
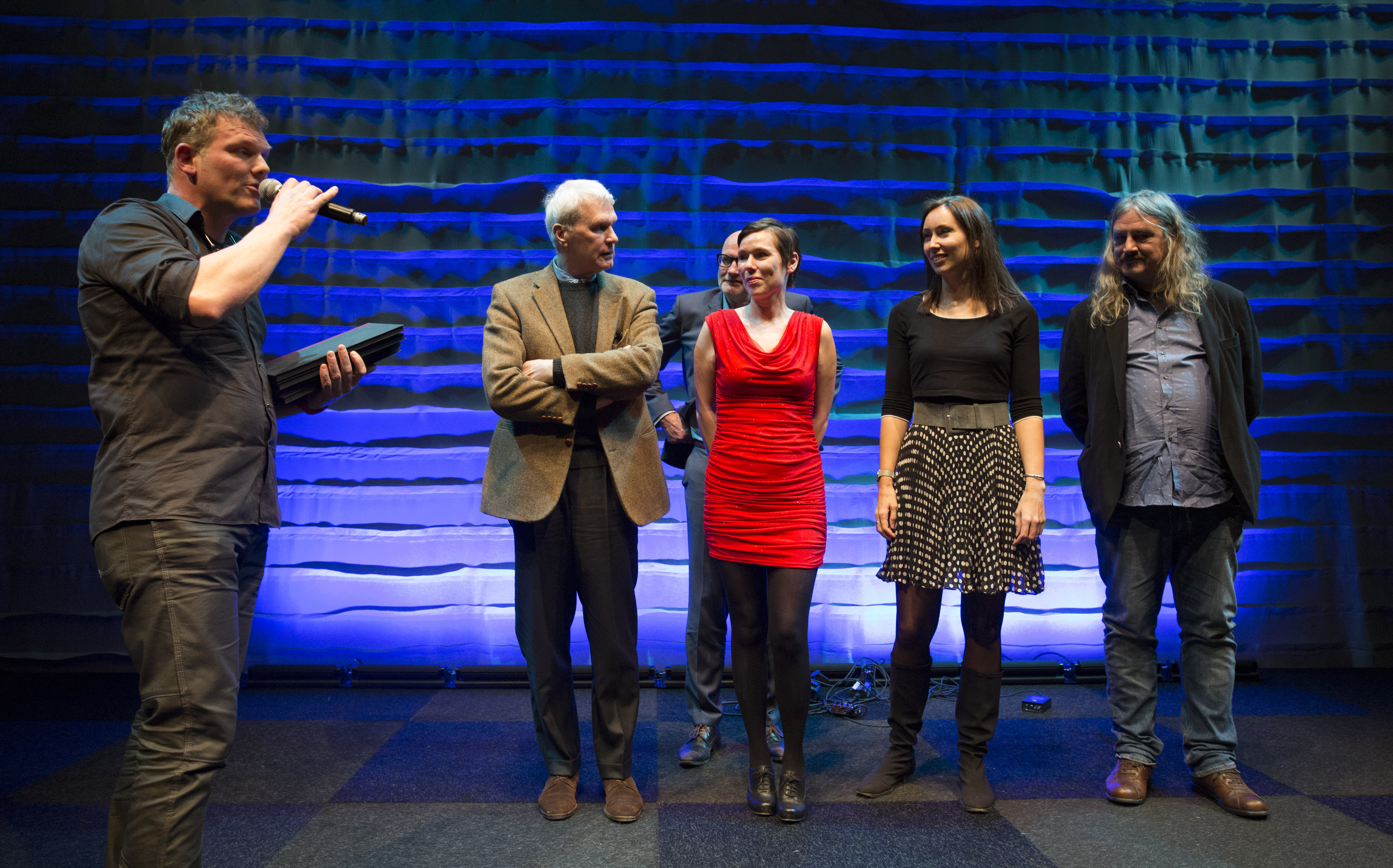
Anna Woltz receiving the Nienke van Hichtum-prijs in January 2016.

- 2012: Thea Beckmanprijs, Ik kan nog steeds niet vliegen
- 2015: Nienke van Hichtum-prijs, Honderd uur nacht
- 2016: Gouden Griffel, Gips
- 2016: Kleine Cervantes, Honderd uur nacht
- 2017: Zilveren Griffel, Alaska
