= Mensje van Keulen =

Dutch writer (born 1946)

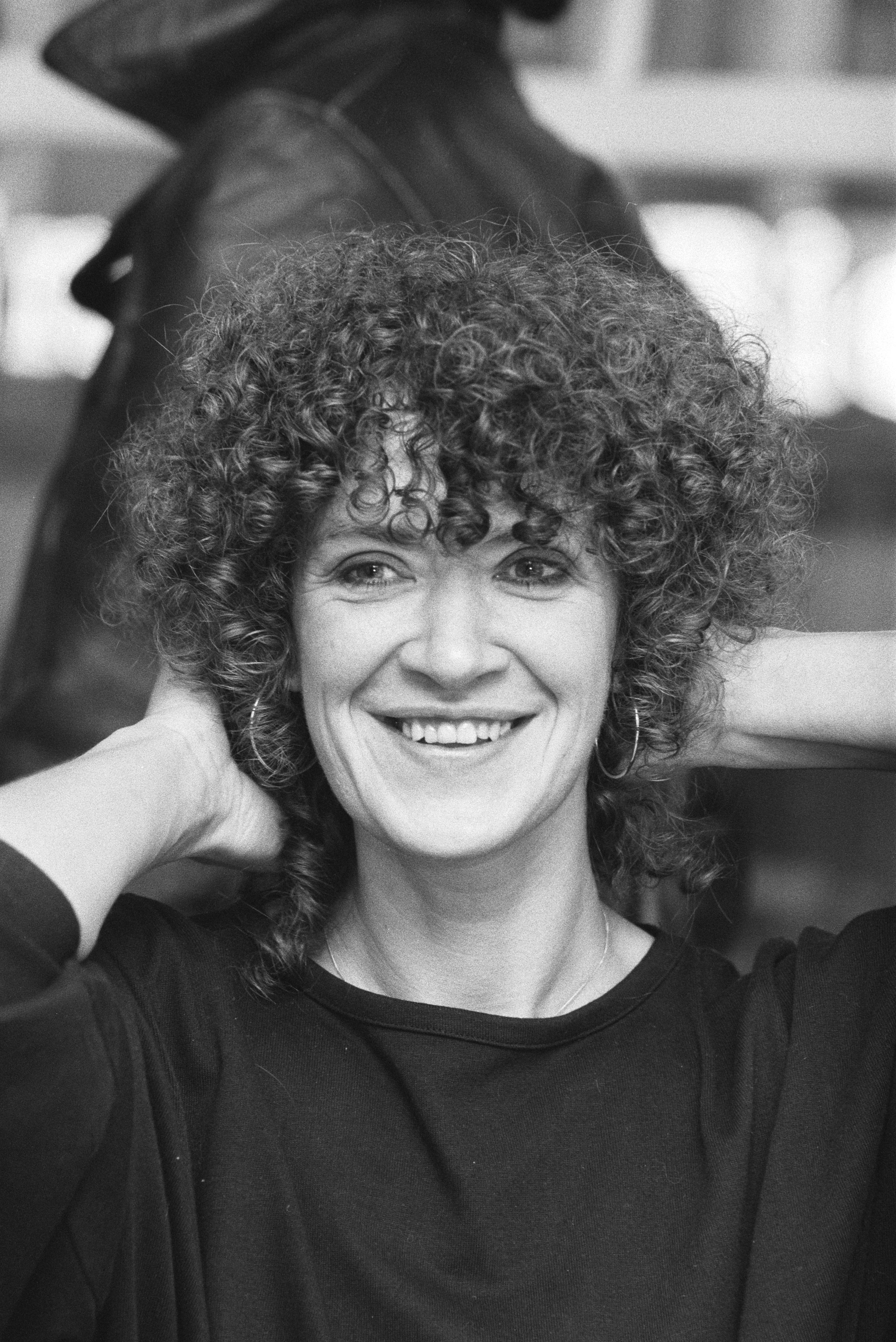
- Mensje van Keulen (1983)
- Born: Mensje Francina van der Steen; 10 June 1946 (age 80); The Hague, Netherlands
- Writing career
- Pen name: Mensje van Keulen, Josien Meloen, Constant P. Cavalry
- Notable awards: Zilveren Griffel 1986; Nienke van Hichtum-prijs 1991; Charlotte Köhler Prize 2011; Constantijn Huygens Prize 2014

Mensje van Keulen (born 10 June 1946), pseudonym of Mensje Francina van der Steen, is a Dutch writer.

== Career ==
Early in her career van Keulen made drawings, stories and poems for the magazine Propria Cures. Van Keulen made her debut in 1972 with the book Bleekers zomer. Van Keulen was editor of the magazine Maatstaf between 1973 and 1981.

In 1986, van Keulen won the Zilveren Griffel award for her first children's book Tommie Station (1985). In 1991, she won the Nienke van Hichtum-prijs for her children's book Vrienden van de maan. A few years later, she received a Vlag en Wimpel award in 1993 for her book Meneer Ratti.

For her entire oeuvre she won the Charlotte Köhler Prize in 2011. She also won the Constantijn Huygens Prize in 2014 for her entire oeuvre. In 2021, she won the J.M.A. Biesheuvelprijs for her short stories collection Ik moet u echt iets zeggen. As of September 2026, she is scheduled to write the Boekenweekgeschenk for the 2027 Boekenweek event.

Van Keulen's children's books have been illustrated by various illustrators, including Thé Tjong-Khing, Willem van Malsen and Jan Jutte.

Some of van Keulen's work has been published under the pseudonyms Josien Meloen and Constant P. Cavalry.

== Politics ==
Van Keulen was also lijstduwer for the Party for the Animals during the European Parliament election in the Netherlands in 2004 as well as in 2014.

She was also on the list of candidates during the 2006 Dutch general election as well as the 2017 Dutch general election.

== Personal life ==
Van Keulen has been a vegetarian from age 20. Van Keulen was married and she has one son.

== Awards ==
- 1986: Zilveren Griffel, Tommie Station
- 1991: Nienke van Hichtum-prijs, Vrienden van de maan
- 1993: Vlag en Wimpel, Meneer Ratti
- 2003: Annie Romeinprijs, entire oeuvre
- 2011: Charlotte Köhler Prize, entire oeuvre
- 2014: Constantijn Huygens Prize
- 2021: J.M.A. Biesheuvelprijs, Ik moet u echt iets zeggen
