= Kees Fens =

Dutch writer (1929–2008)

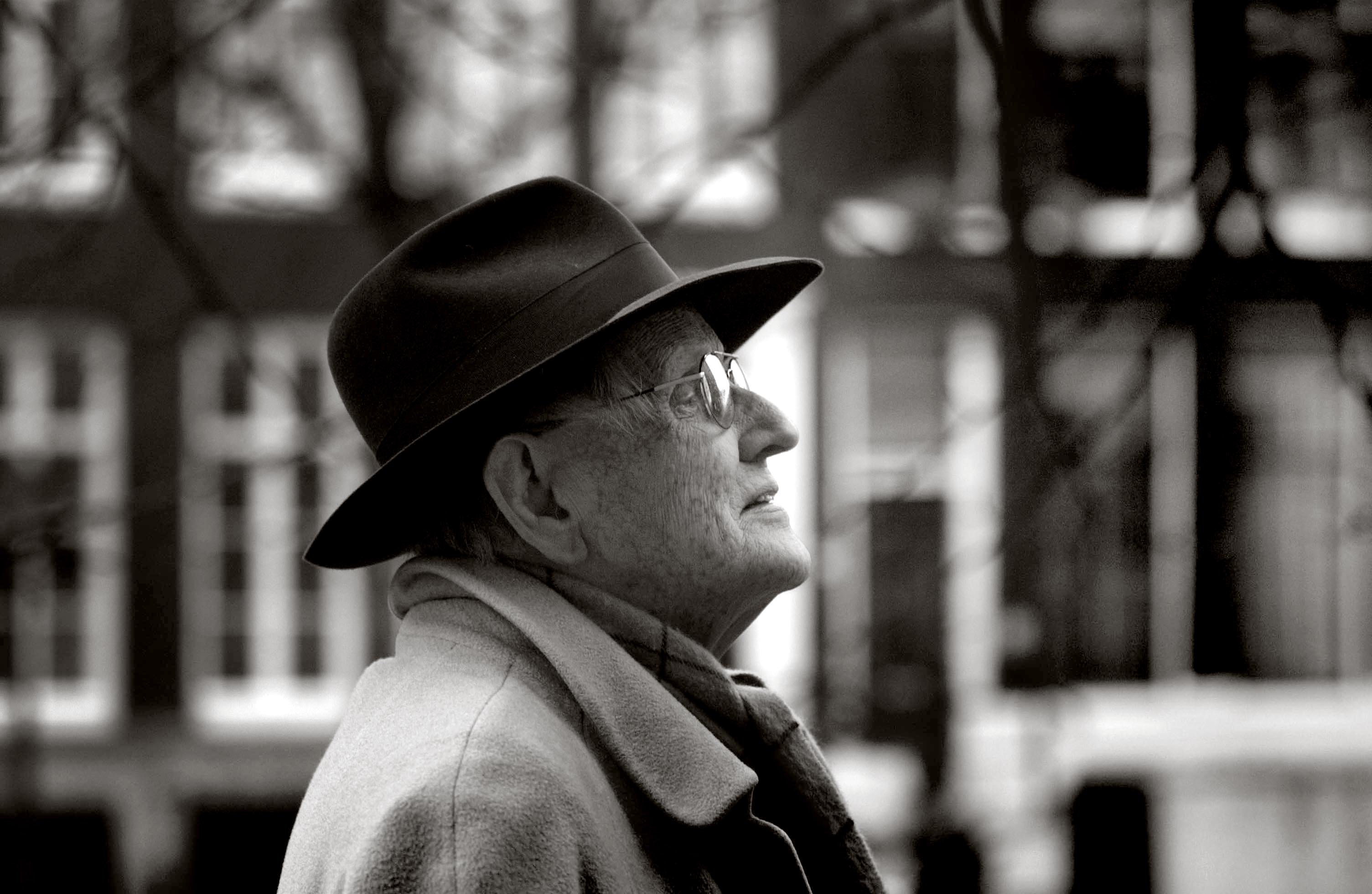
- Born: 18 October 1929; Amsterdam, Netherlands
- Died: 14 June 2008 (aged 78)
- Occupation: writer

Kees Fens (18 October 1929 in Amsterdam – 14 June 2008) was a Dutch writer, essayist and literary critic.

Fens received the P. C. Hooft Award in 1990. In 1999 he received the Laurens Janszoon Costerprijs.

== Awards ==
- 1986: Frans Erens Award
- 1990: The P. C. Hooft Award
