= Miep Diekmann =

Dutch writer of children's literature

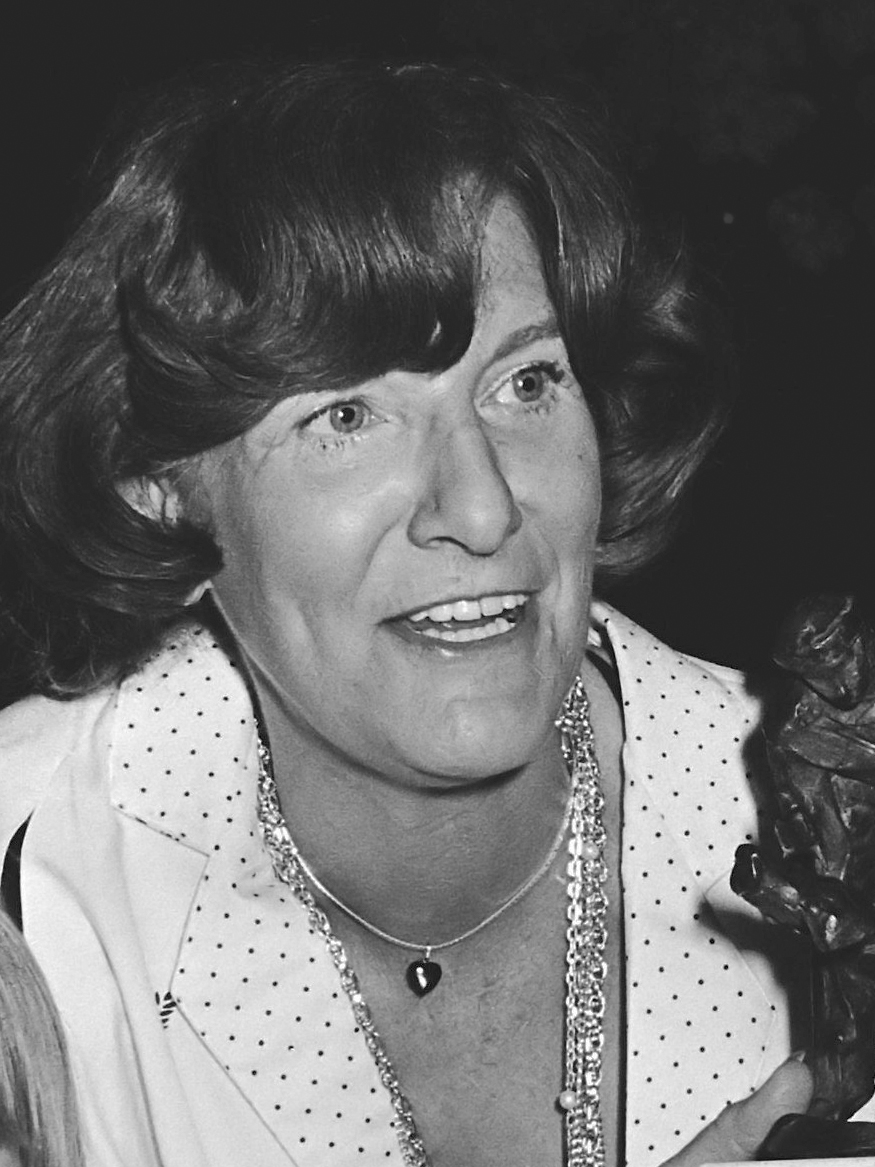
- Miep Diekmann in 1979
- Born: Maria Hendrika Jozina Diekmann; 26 January 1925; Assen, Netherlands
- Died: 9 July 2017 (aged 92); Scheveningen (The Hague), Netherlands
- Occupation: Writer
- Writing career
- Genre: Children's literature

Miep Diekmann (26 January 1925 – 9 July 2017) was a Dutch writer of children's literature.

== Early life ==
Diekmann was born in 1925 in Assen. Her father worked in the military and as a result the family moved several times: Diekmann moved to Kampen in 1928, to Vreeland in 1930 and in 1934 to Willemstad, Curaçao, where she lived until 1939.

== Career ==
=== Dutch Caribbean ===
Her early life in Curaçao would become the source of inspiration for several children's books, including De boten van Brakkeput (1956), Padu is gek (1957) and De dagen van Olim (1971). In 1956 she won the Kinderboek van het jaar literary award for her book De boten van Brakkeput and the story was turned into a radio play in 1959.

Together with Alice van Romondt and Liesbet ten Houten she helped found Aruban publishing company Charuba in 1984 in cooperation with Dutch publishing company Leopold. Between 1981 and 1988 she stayed in Aruba for several months a year to coach Aruban writers. Some of the writers she coached include Sonia Garmers, Richard Piternella, Frances Kelly, Josette Daal, Desiree Correa and Diana Lebacs.

=== Czechoslovakia / Czech Republic ===
Diekmann traveled to Czechoslovakia during the 1960s and 1970s to help various Czech authors. In 1981, she won the Boekensleutel award together with Czech writer and poet Dagmar Hilarová for the book Ik heb geen naam. Both were awarded the Janusz Korczak Literary Prize by the Polish National Section of the International Board on Books for Young People in 1983 for this book. Between 1979 and 1982, Diepmann was also the head of the Dutch Section of the International Board on Books for Young People. She became an honorary member of PEN International in the Czech Republic in 1994 for her contributions to Czech literature.

=== Other ===
In 1964, she won the Deutscher Jugendbuchpreis for her book En de groeten van Elio (1961). The story was also turned into a radio play for German radio. In 1970, she received the Staatsprijs voor kinder- en jeugdliteratuur literary award. Diepmann worked to create this award a few years earlier in 1964. For her book Dan ben je nergens meer she received the Nienke van Hichtum-prijs literary award in 1975 .

In 1978, she wrote children's poetry book Wiele wiele stap with illustrations by Thé Tjong-Khing. Diekmann won a Gouden Griffel award for the book and Thé Tjong-Khing won a Gouden Penseel award. Her next children's poetry book Stappe stappe step, also illustrated by Thé Tjong-Khing, received a Vlag en Wimpel award in 1980. For her contributions to children's literature she won the Laurens Janszoon Costerprijs in 1979.

In 1985, she won the Vlag en Wimpel literary award for the book Hannes en Kaatje, 2 in een straatje. She also won the Vlag en Wimpel award in 1986 for Hannes en Kaatje en het rommellaatje. Her books featuring the characters Hannes and Kaatje have been described as a modern version of Jip and Janneke or Ot and Sien. Together with her daughter in law Marlieke van Wersch she also won a Vlag en Wimpel in 1987 for Hoe schilder hoe wilder, a novel that aims to relate the work of 17th century painters to everyday life in that era.

Her books translated into English include De boten van Brakkeput (as The Haunted Island, 1959), Gewoon een straatje (as Just a Street, 1963), Marijn bij de lorredraaiers (as Slave Doctor, 1970), and Jossy wordt een Indiaan (as Indian Jossy, 1970).

== Personal life ==
Diekmann was married from 1948 to 1954 to journalist Anton Kamphoff, with whom she had two sons. Diekmann died on 9 July 2017.

== Awards ==
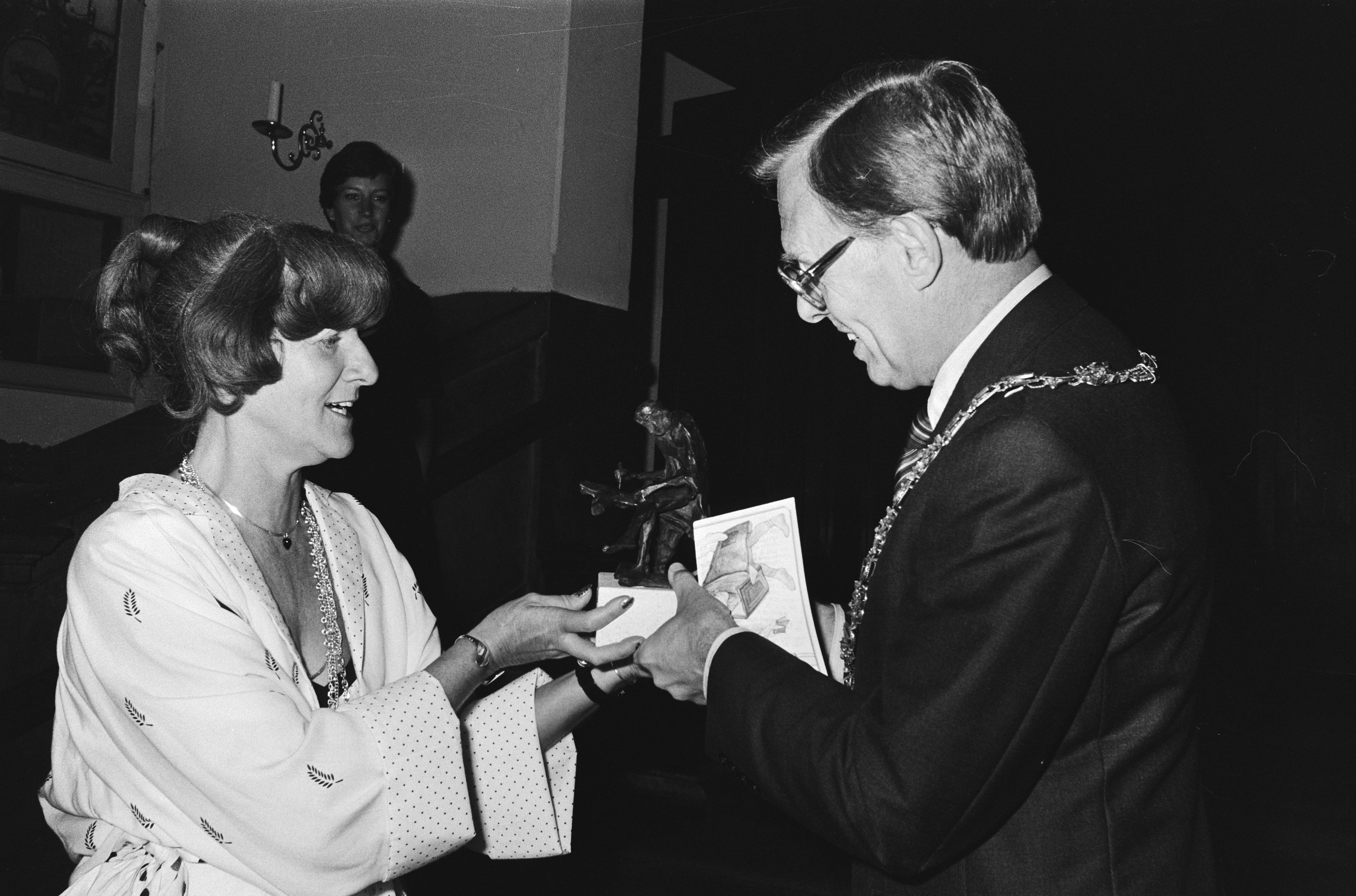
Miep Diekmann receiving the Laurens Janszoon Costerprijs from mayor of Haarlem Jan Reehorst in 1979.

- 1956: Kinderboek van het jaar (De boten van Brakkeput)
- 1964: Deutscher Jugendbuchpreis (En de groeten van Elio)
- 1970: Staatsprijs voor kinder- en jeugdliteratuur
- 1975: Nienke van Hichtum-prijs (Dan ben je nergens meer)
- 1978: Gouden Griffel (Wiele wiele stap)
- 1979: Laurens Janszoon Costerprijs
- 1980: Vlag en Wimpel (Stappe stappe step)
- 1981: Boekensleutel (Ik heb geen naam)
- 1986: Vlag en Wimpel (Hannes en Kaatje, 2 in een straatje)
- 1987: Vlag en Wimpel (Hannes en Kaatje en het rommellaatje)
- 1987: Vlag en Wimpel (Hoe schilder hoe wilder)
- 1991: nomination Publieksprijs voor het Nederlandse Boek
