= Terry Willers =

Terry Willers (1935 – 9 November 2011) was a cartoonist and comics artist in Ireland. He was born in Barnet in North London but spent most of his life in Ireland, living initially in Carrigower then for over 40 years in Rathdrum, both in County Wicklow. In 1992, he was the co-founder and chairman of the Guinness International Cartoon Festival, which ran for three years in Rathdrum. He was a winner of the Jacobs Award for his work for television.

Willers worked as an errand boy at a film studio in London when he was 15, then he joined British Disney magazine Mickey Mouse Weekly. At the age of 17 he was contributing the four-panel cartoon 'Tich' to TV Comic (1952–53). In 1959, he also contributed the cartoon Zip to Jack & Jill.

Around this time, Willers began working for the Marten Toonder Studio in the Netherlands, drawing 'Panda' and, from 1963, 'Tom Poes', a hugely popular newspaper strip created by Toonder in 1941. According to Lambiek, "he added a slapstick element to the strips, and intensified the absurdism in the artwork." The strip ran in the Dutch newspaper De Volkskrant and various regional papers until 1965. He then went to draw 'Kappie', the adventures of Captain Anne Wobke and the crew of his tug, the Kraak for three years. In 1968, he returned to 'Tom Poes', when he did a comic strip for Donald Duck comic. Willers also contributed briefly to British comics during this period, ghosting episodes of 'General Nitt and His Barmy Army' and 'Georgie's Germs' for Wham!.

Willers contributed in the 1970s and 1980s to the RTÉ television programmes, Hall's Pictorial Weekly, hosted by Frank Hall, and The Mike Murphy Show. He was also a prolific contributor to magazines, including the Farmer's Journal, Sunday Independent, Evening Herald and Wicklow People. In the 1990s, Willers contributed to The Yellow Press, an Irish anthology comic, and The Beano, drawing 'Minder Bird' in 1995. He also illustrated several books, including Brian Power presents 'It's All Happening' (1970), The TV Generation by Desmond Forristal (1970), Gift of the Gab! The Irish Conversation Guide by Tadhg Hayes (1996, later reprinted as The Wit of Irish Conversation), Twelve Days Of Chaos by Frank Kelly (1997) and Stop Howling At The Moon by Eamon O'Donnell (2007).

When he died aged 76, a posthumous appreciation in the Irish Independent said, "Nobody who encountered Terry in full flight in his persona as Rathdrum's cartoon ambassador to the world is likely to forget him...Terry must have had three hands because despite having a cigarette in one and a glass in the other, he was always drawing on any surface that held still -- even the walls of his beloved Cartoon Inn in Rathdrum village where so many of his exuberant productions are still proudly displayed." Willers was described as "a stylish and dapper dresser" who was never seen without a shirt and tie and "the sort of pastel blazer favoured by the gameshow host that he so resembled".

Writing in the Irish Times, fellow cartoonist Martyn Turner wrote, "He was always very happy and full of jokes and was an incredibly talented artist. Most cartoonists become cartoonists because they have to...but Terry could draw anything and everything. In many ways he was an artist more than he was a cartoonist."
