= Gertie Evenhuis =

Dutch writer (1927–2005)

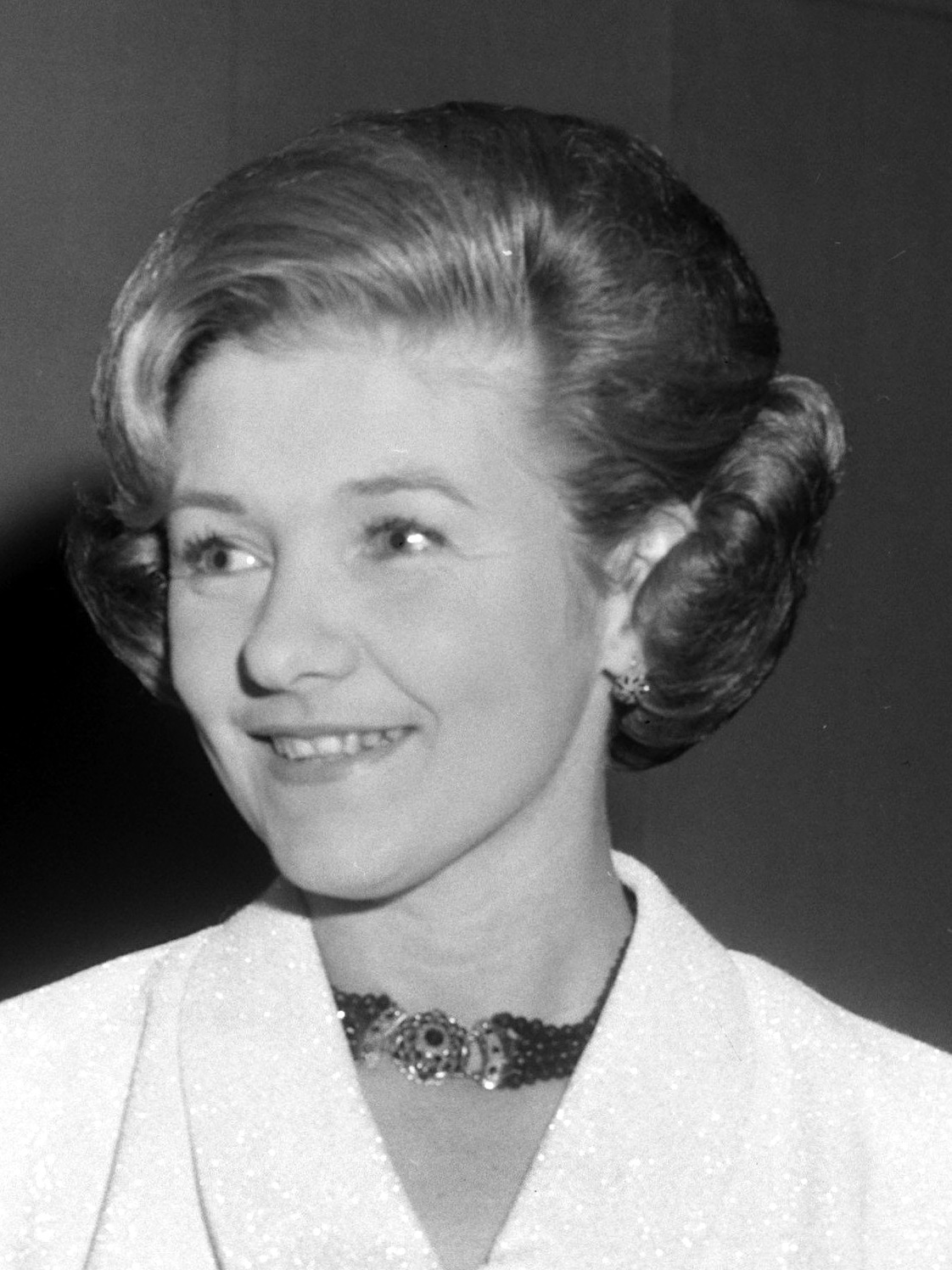
- Gertie Evenhuis (1964)
- Born: 4 March 1927; Stadskanaal, Netherlands
- Died: 19 August 2005 (aged 78); Amsterdam, Netherlands
- Occupation: Writer
- Writing career
- Language: Dutch
- Notable awards: Nienke van Hichtum-prijs 1964; Zilveren Griffel 1974

Gertie Evenhuis (4 March 1927 – 19 August 2005) was a Dutch writer of children's literature.

== Biography ==
Evenhuis made her debut in 1958 with the book Avontuur aan de grens.

She received the very first Nienke van Hichtum-prijs in 1964 for her book Wij waren er ook bij based on the diary that she kept during World War II. Her experience of growing up during World War II was also used for the books De vaders en broers van Putten (1965) and En waarom ik niet? (1970).

In 1974, she received the Zilveren Griffel for her book Stefan en Stefan, a story about a boy from Amsterdam visiting Romania to find his grandfather. Evenhuis traveled to Romania for a month to study the country's culture. Evenhuis also wrote De tram is geel het gras is groen which was the Kinderboekenweekgeschenk published during the Kinderboekenweek of 1978.

In 1973, Evenhuis and Jos Vandeloo wrote the screenplay for the television series Boerin in Frankrijk, based on Wil den Hollander's autobiographic books.

Evenhuis' books have been illustrated by various illustrators, including Otto Dicke, Jenny Dalenoord and Rien Poortvliet.

Evenhuis married and had four children.

Evenhuis died of a heart attack in 2005. She was buried at Zorgvlied.

== Awards ==
- 1964: Nienke van Hichtum-prijs, Wij waren er ook bij
- 1974: Zilveren Griffel, Stefan en Stefan
