= Panda (comics) =

Dutch comic strip series

- Author(s): Marten Toonder (assistants: Jan Gerhard Toonder, Lo Hartog van Banda, Eiso Toonder, Wim Lensen, Ben van Voorn, Richard Klokkers, Harry Hargreaves, Terry Willers, Fred Julsing, Dick Matena and Piet Wijn.)
- Current status/schedule: Discontinued
- Launch date: 1946
- End date: 1991
- Genre(s): Action, Humor, adventure, satire

Panda was a Dutch comic strip series, created by Marten Toonder. After Tom Puss it was his second most successful and well known comic strip and very popular in foreign translations. It debuted in 1946 and ran until 1991.

== Concept ==
Panda is a talking animal comic strip about a young panda, Panda. The stories take place in a fantasy environment with anthropomorphic animals. Like many Dutch comic strips in the 1940s and 1950s it was published in a text comic format, with the text below the images. Later stories have been published as a balloon comic too.

=== Characters ===
- Panda: A young, smart and intelligent panda who travels into the wide world. In terms of design he looks very similar to Tom Poes. He lives in Hobbeldonk.
- Jollipop: A dog who is Panda's personal servant. In terms of design he is an expy of Joost, the butler of Oliver B. Bumble in the Tom Poes stories.
- Joris Goedbloed: A sly fox who is a con-artist and a trickster. He often expresses himself in macaronic Latin. He serves as the antagonist of the series, but despite his lies, tricks and frequent abuse of Panda's confidence he also ensures that the little bear is not put in actual danger.

== History ==
Marten Toonder created the strip on December 23, 1946. The series was a success in the Netherlands, but was also published in Australia, Belgium, Curaçao, Denmark, Germany, Great Britain, Finland, France, Ireland, Luxembourg, Norway, Iceland and Sweden. Most of the art work was done by his personal studio, Toonder Studios. Among the artists who drew the series are Jan Gerhard Toonder, Lo Hartog van Banda, Eiso Toonder, Wim Lensen, Ben van Voorn, Richard Klokkers, Jaap Lamberton, Harry Hargreaves, Terry Willers, Fred Julsing, Dick Matena and Piet Wijn. About 199 stories have been drawn. On December 31, 1991 the final episode was published.

== Availability ==
The Dutch publishing company Panda, who specialize in luxury editions of Dutch comics, were named after the series. In 2012, to commemorate Toonder's 100th birthday, the complete Panda stories were published in 44 luxury books.
