= Mance Post =

Dutch illustrator (1925–2013)

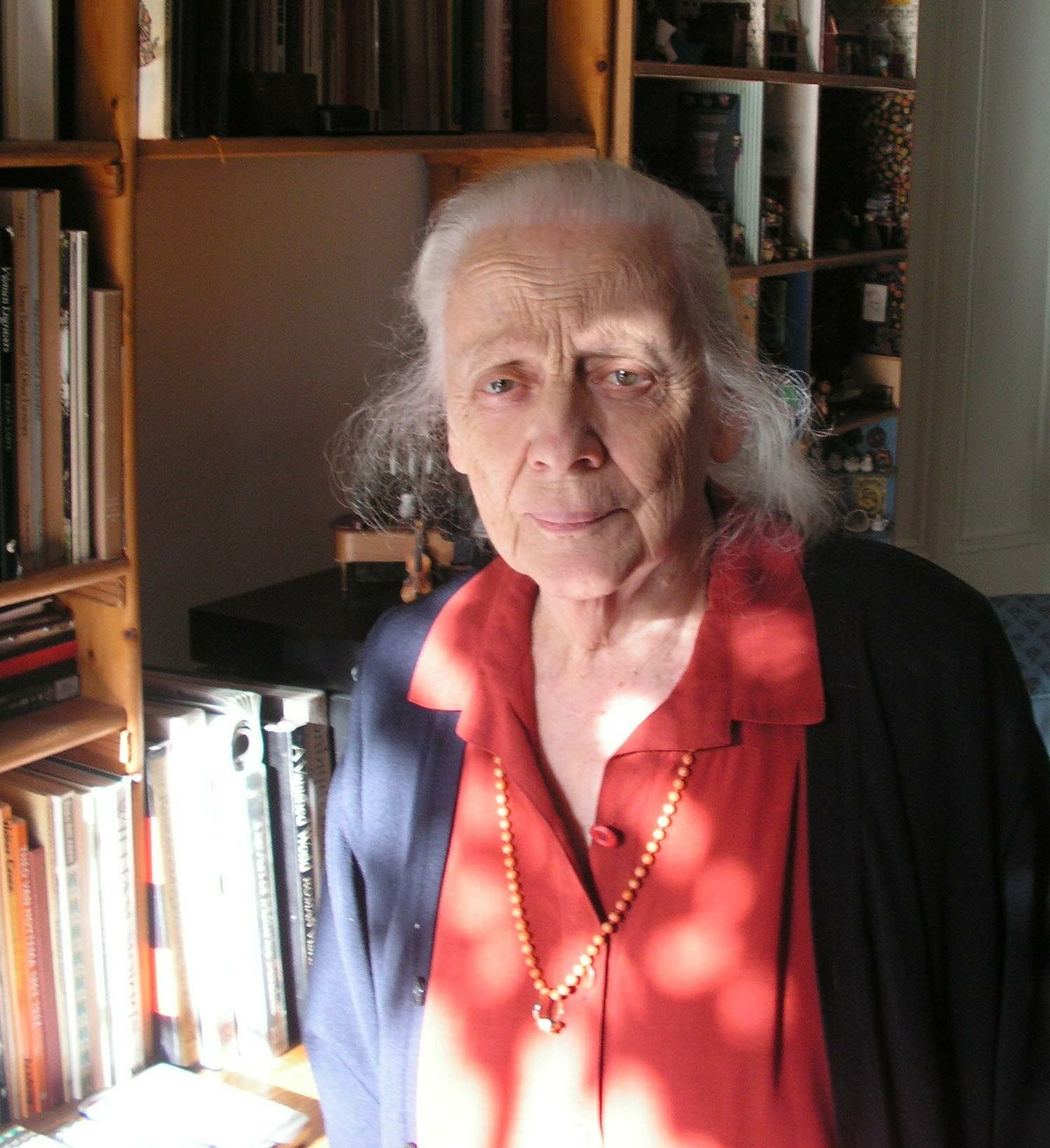
- Mance Post (2007)
- Born: Hermance Berendina Post; 11 January 1925; Amsterdam, Netherlands
- Died: 2 December 2013 (aged 88); Amsterdam, Netherlands
- Known for: Illustration
- Awards: Zilveren Penseel 2006; Max Velthuijs-prijs 2007

Mance Post (11 January 1925 – 2 December 2013) was a Dutch illustrator.

She is known for illustrating many books written by various Dutch authors, in particular Guus Kuijer and Toon Tellegen.

== Career ==
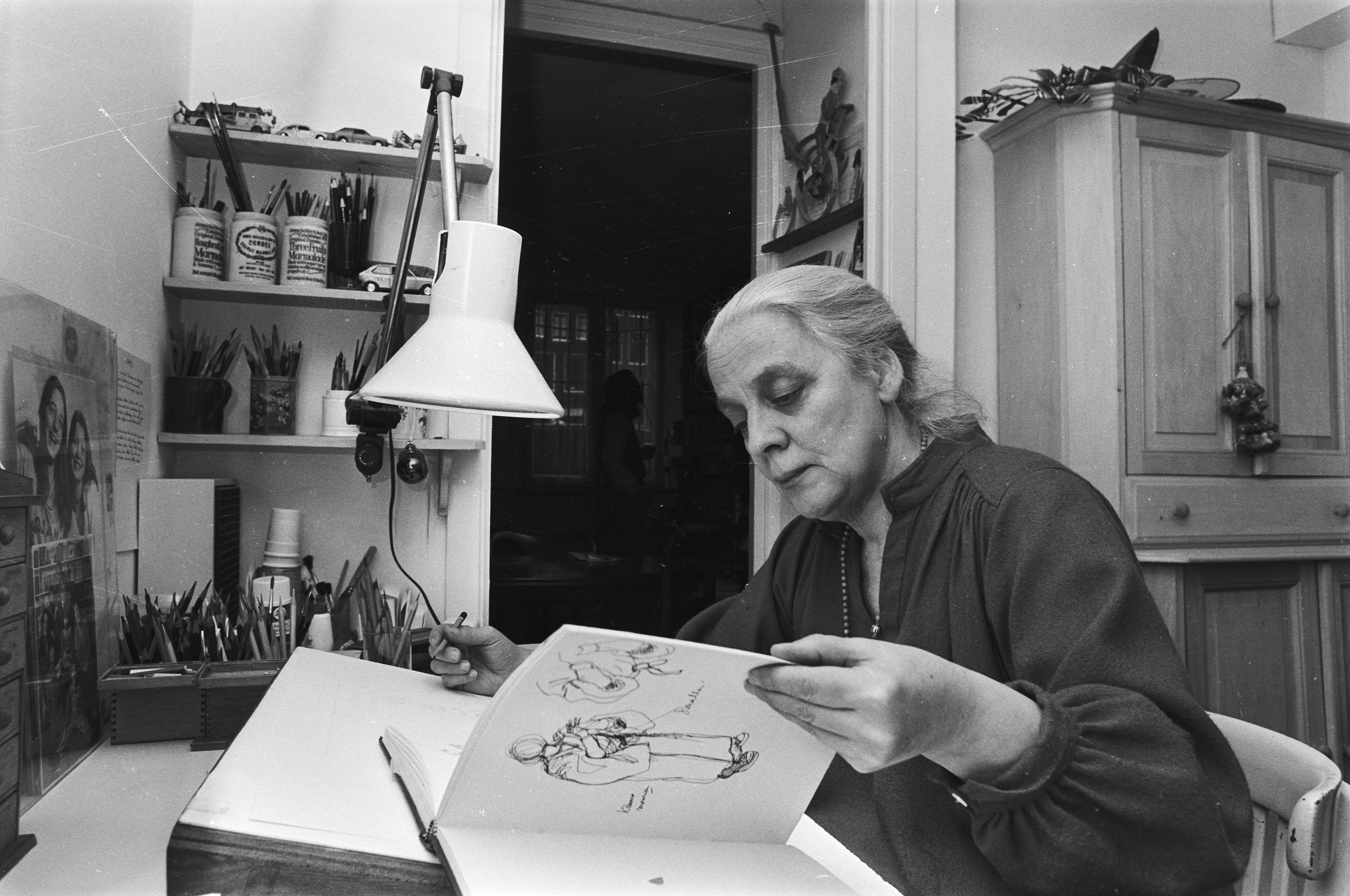
Mance Post (1980)

Post made her debut in 1946 as illustrator of the book Het boek van Thijs en Claartje written by J.A. Schreuder. Post won a Vlag en Wimpel award in 1980 for illustrating the book Ik woonde in een leunstoel by Guus Kuijer and also in 1984 for illustrating the book Het geheim van Toet-Mu-Is III by Mansfield Kirby.

Post illustrated many of Guus Kuijer's books, in particular his Madelief book series. Kuijer won two Gouden Griffel awards and one Zilveren Griffel award for three books in the series. The series was later adapted to television (Madelief, 1994) and film (Scratches in the Table, 1998). In 1982 she won the Deutscher Jugendliteraturpreis together with Guus Kuijer for the book Erzähl mir von Oma, the German translation of Krassen in het tafelblad (1978).

From 1985 onwards Post illustrated many of Toon Tellegen's books for almost three decades. In 2006, at age 81, Post received the Zilveren Penseel award for her illustrations in Tellegen's book Midden in de nacht.

Post illustrated books by many other Dutch authors as well, including Annie M.G. Schmidt, Ienne Biemans and Hans Hagen. In 2020, some of her illustrations for Annie M. G. Schmidt's books appeared in an online exhibition by the Dutch Literature Museum. The exhibition was held to mark the 25th anniversary of Schmidt's death.

Post was the first recipient of the prestigious Max Velthuijs-prijs for her entire oeuvre in 2007.

== Death ==
Post died in December 2013.

== Awards ==
- 1980: Vlag en Wimpel, Ik woonde in een leunstoel
- 1982: Deutscher Jugendliteraturpreis, Erzähl mir von Oma (written by Guus Kuijer)
- 1984: Vlag en Wimpel, Het geheim van Toet-Mu-Is III
- 2006: Zilveren Penseel, Middenin de nacht
- 2007: Max Velthuijs-prijs, entire oeuvre
