= Fleur van der Weel =

Dutch illustrator (born 1970)

- Born: 9 February 1970 (age 55); Middelburg, Netherlands
- Known for: Illustration
- Awards: Woutertje Pieterse Prijs 2004

Fleur van der Weel (born 9 February 1970) is a Dutch illustrator.

== Career ==
In 2004, Van der Weel and Edward van de Vendel won the Woutertje Pieterse Prijs for their book Superguppie (2003). She also received the Vlag en Wimpel award for her illustrations in this book. In the years that followed, both published several other books in the Supperguppie book series. In 2012, they both also published the book Hallo, a picture book on the occasion of the Kinderboekenweek.

Van der Weel has illustrated books by various Dutch authors, including Bibi Dumon Tak, Fiona Rempt, Magda Ria Rapoye and Rindert Kromhout.

== Awards ==
- 2004: Woutertje Pieterse Prijs, Superguppie (with Edward van de Vendel)
- 2004: Vlag en Wimpel, Superguppie
