= Annet Schaap =

Dutch illustrator and writer (born 1965)

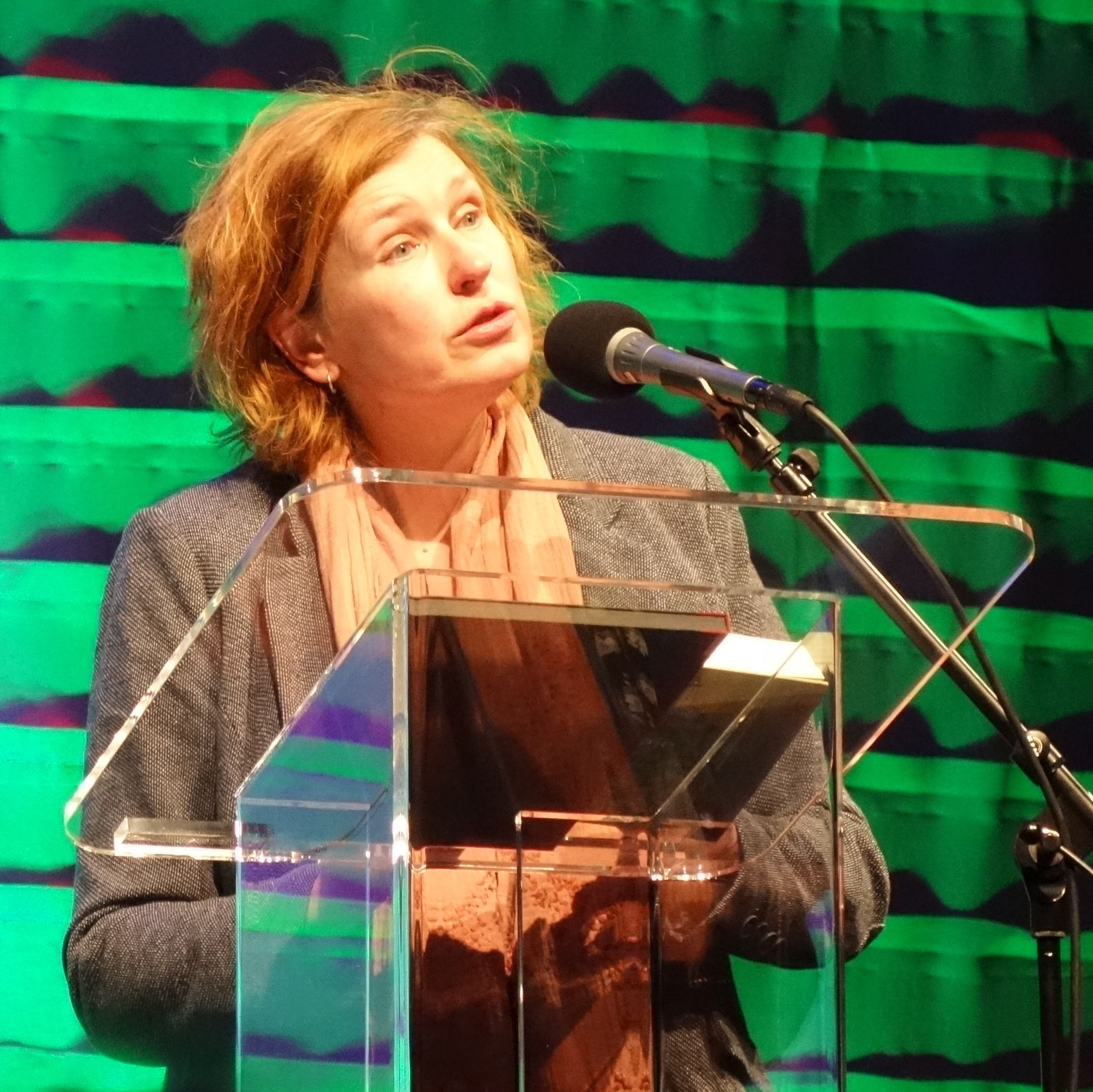
- Annet Schaap (2018)
- Born: 27 February 1965 (age 61); Ochten, Netherlands
- Known for: Illustration
- Awards: Gouden Griffel 2018; Woutertje Pieterse Prijs 2018

Annet Schaap (born 27 February 1965, Ochten) is a Dutch illustrator and writer of children's literature.

== Biography ==
Schaap studied at an art school in Kampen (Christelijke Academie voor Beeldende Kunsten) and later at the Royal Academy of Art in The Hague. One of her teachers was Peter van Hugten. Between 1995 and 1999 she studied at a writers' school in Amsterdam.

In 1988, she illustrated her first children's book, Joppe, Julia en Jericho by Austrian writer Christine Nöstlinger. Schaap went on to illustrate numerous books for numerous authors, including Francine Oomen, Jacques Vriens, Mieke van Hooft, Thea Dubelaar and Janneke Schotveld. Other authors include Liesbeth van der Jagt, Paul Biegel and Astrid Lindgren. Her illustrations have also been published in children's magazines, such as Okki and Taptoe.

In 2017, she made her debut as author with the book Lampje. For this book she won the Nienke van Hichtum-prijs, the Woutertje Pieterse Prijs and the Gouden Griffel. Schaap is the first author to win the Woutertje Pieterse Prijs with a debut novel. She became the second author to win these three awards for her book, Peter van Gestel being the first with his book Winterijs in 2001. In 2018, Schaap also won the Boekenleeuw award for Lampje. The book has been translated by Laura Watkinson into English as Lampie and the Children of the Sea. In 2020, the book was nominated for the Carnegie Medal award. This was the first time a translated book was nominated for the award.

Schaap won the 2026 De Boon audience award, a Flemish literary award, in the category children's books for her book Krekel.

== Awards ==
- 2017: Nienke van Hichtum-prijs, Lampje
- 2018: Woutertje Pieterse Prijs, Lampje
- 2018: Gouden Griffel, Lampje
- 2018: Boekenleeuw, Lampje
- 2023: De Boon for Children's and youth literature, Misjka (with Edward van de Vendel and Anoush Elman)
- 2026: De Boon audience award for Children's and youth literature, Krekel
