= Kristien Dieltiens =

Flemish author (born 1954)

- Born: 29 September 1954 (age 70); Antwerp, Belgium
- Language: Dutch
- Notable awards: Woutertje Pieterse Prijs 2013

Kristien Dieltiens (born 27 September 1954) is a Flemish author.

== Career ==
Dieltiens made her debut in 1997 with De gouden bal. For her book Olrac (2000) she won the Prijs van de Kinder- en Jeugdjury Vlaanderen in 2002.

For her 50th book Kelderkind Dieltiens won the Woutertje Pieterse Prijs in 2013. The book draws inspiration from the life of Kaspar Hauser, a German youth who claimed to have grown up in the total isolation of a darkened cell. In 2012, Dieltiens also won the West-Vlaamse Provinciale Prijs Letterkunde for this book and it was also nominated for a Boekenleeuw.

Her son Gust Van den Berghe (born 1985) is a renowned film director.

== Awards ==
- 2002: Prijs van de Kinder- en Jeugdjury Vlaanderen, Olrac
- 2012: West-Vlaamse Provinciale Prijs Letterkunde, Kelderkind
- 2013: Woutertje Pieterse Prijs, Kelderkind
- 2014: Kleine Cervantes, Kelderkind
