= Boekensleutel =

Dutch literary award

The Boekensleutel is a Dutch literary award infrequently awarded by the Dutch organisation Collectieve Propaganda van het Nederlandse Boek. The Boekensleutel is awarded to books that stand out due to their genre, techniques used or for reasons that are not traditionally covered by other literary awards. Books that are translated into Dutch are also eligible for the award.

== Winners ==
- 1979: Virginia Allen Jensen (Wat is dat?)
- 1981: Dagmar Hilarová and Miep Diekmann (Ik heb geen naam)
- 1986: Virginia Allen Jensen (Pak me dan)
- 1988: Janet and Allan Ahlberg (De puike postbode)
- 1992: Catharine Roehrig (Spelen met hiërogliefen)
- 1996: Lucy Cousins (Het huis van muis)
- 2000: Joan Steiner (Je gelooft je ogen niet)
- 2012: Javier Sáez Castán and Miguel Murugarren (Het Dierelirium van Professor Revillod: geïllustreerde almanak der dierenwereld)
- 2019: Ted van Lieshout (Ze gaan er met je neus vandoor)
