= Max Velthuijs-prijs =

Dutch illustration award

- Awarded for: Oeuvre of illustrations in children's literature
- Country: Netherlands
- Presented by: Stichting P.C. Hooft-prijs voor Letterkunde
- Reward: €60,000
- First award: 2007
- Website: https://literatuurmuseum.nl/literatuurprijzen/max-velthuijs-prijs

The Max Velthuijs-prijs (Dutch for Max Velthuijs Prize) is a Dutch award awarded once every three years to an illustrator of a children's book. The award is not given for a particular work, but for the entire oeuvre. The award is named after Dutch painter, illustrator and writer Max Velthuijs (1923 – 2005). The winner of the prize receives €60,000. The award is awarded by the Stichting P.C. Hooft-prijs voor Letterkunde which also awards the P.C. Hooft-prijs and Theo Thijssen-prijs. The award was established in 2006 and first awarded in 2007.

== Winners ==
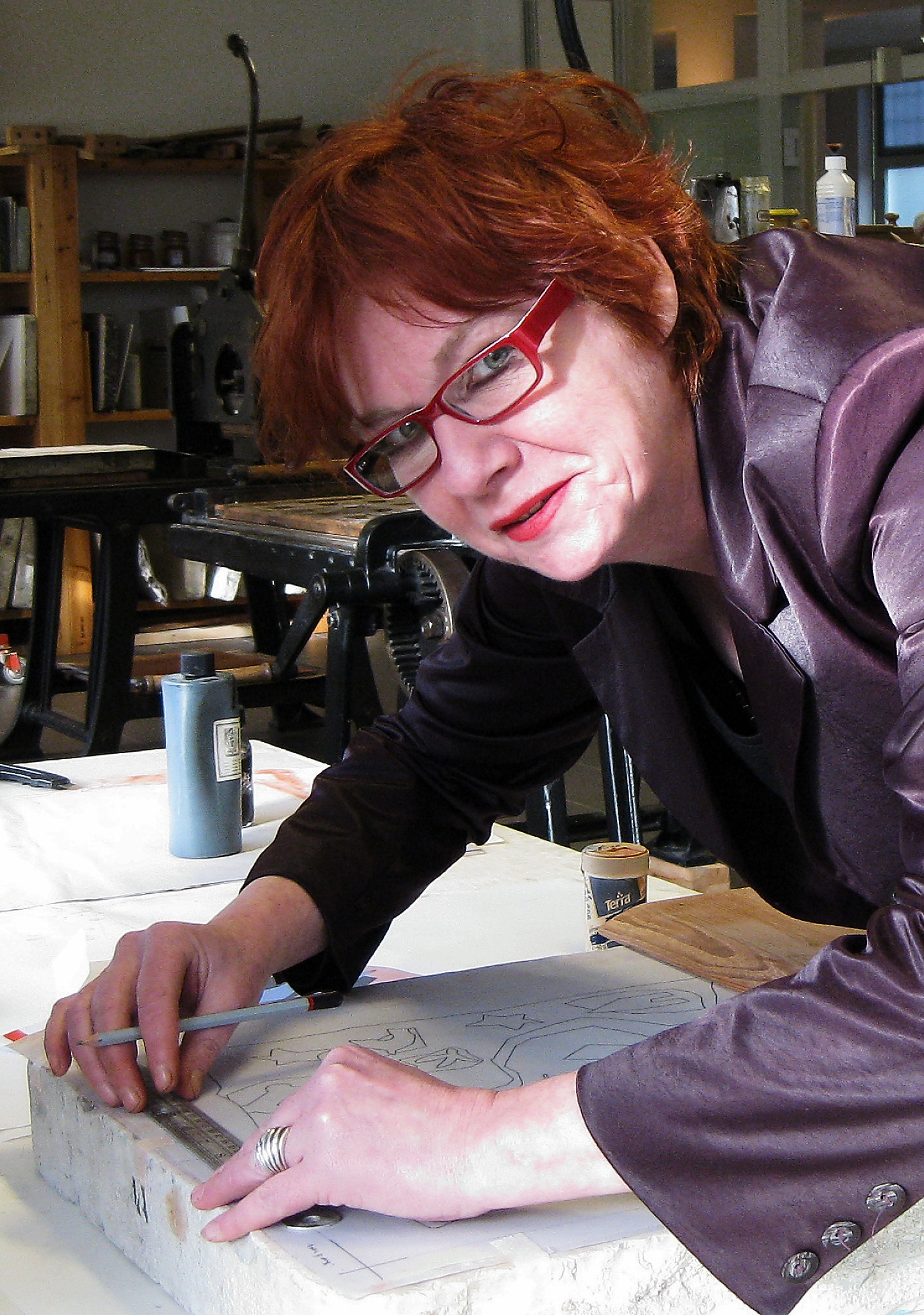
Sylvia Weve (2019 award)

- 2007: Mance Post
- 2010: Thé Tjong-Khing
- 2013: Wim Hofman
- 2016: Dick Bruna
- 2019: Sylvia Weve
- 2022: Philip Hopman
- 2025: Annemarie van Haeringen
