= Imme Dros =

Dutch writer

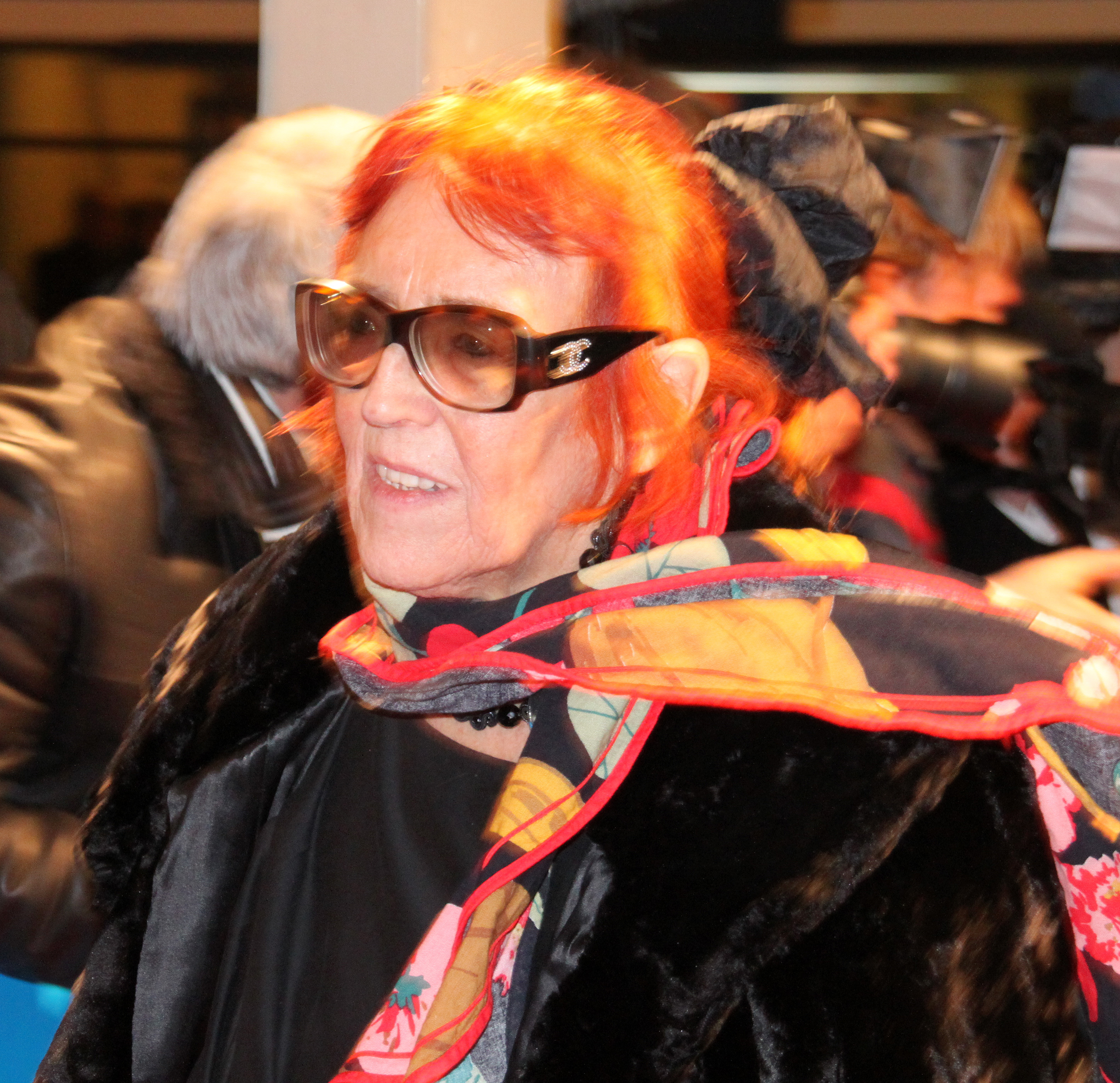
Imme Dros

Imme Dros (born 26 September 1936, Oudeschild, Texel) is a Dutch writer of children's literature.

== Life ==
Dros grew up on the island of Texel. She studied Dutch in Amsterdam. There she met her husband Harrie Geelen, with whom she had three children. As a homemaker, she wrote her first book in 1971. Her husband has illustrated several of her books. She currently resides in Hilversum.

== Work ==
In the 1970s, Dros wrote books mainly about animals. Young adolescents were her main theme in the 1980s, during which time she also shifted towards writing for a younger audience. From the 1990s on she made the classic works of Homer and other Greek mythology stories into new forms. For example, her book Odysseus : een man van verhalen describes how Odysseus attempts to return home after the Trojan War. It is written in a rather poetic style of writing.

Many of her works have received awards from Dutch literary critics. Dros has twice won the Woutertje Pieterse Prijs for best children's book of the year.

== Awards ==
- Nienke van Hichtum-prijs (1983, En een tijd van vrede)
- Woutertje Pieterse Prijs (1988, Annetje Lie in het holst van de nacht with illustrations by Margriet Heymans)
- Woutertje Pieterse Prijs (2006, Bijna jarig, together with Harrie Geelen)
- Theo Thijssen-prijs (2003)

Dros also wrote the book Een heel lief konijn for which Jaap Lamberton won the Woutertje Pieterse Prijs in 1993.
