= Edward van de Vendel =

Dutch writer of children's literature

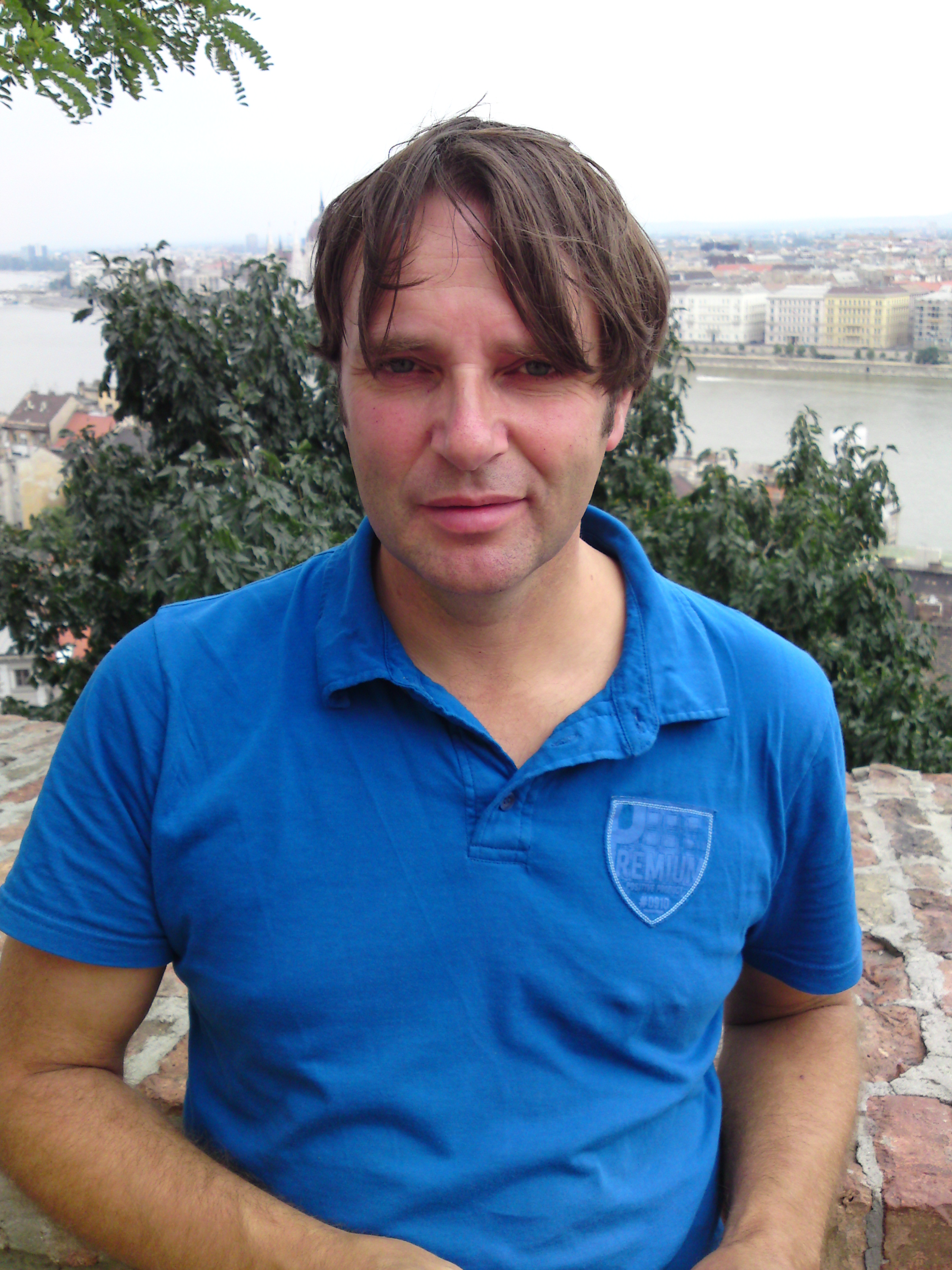
- Vendel in 2009
- Born: 1 August 1964 (age 61) Leerdam, Netherlands
- Occupation: Author, Writer
- Subject: Children's literature
- Notable awards: Woutertje Pieterse Prijs 2004 2016

Website
- www.edwardvandevendel.nl/en

Edward van de Vendel (born 1 August 1964) is a Dutch teacher, author, poet and writer of children's literature.

== Early life ==
Van de Vendel was born in 1964 in Leerdam, Netherlands. He worked as a teacher for several years before becoming a full-time writer in 2001.

== Career ==
Van de Vendel made his poetry debut in 1996 with Betrap me.

In 2001, Van de Vendel published Wat rijmt er op puree?, the Kinderboekenweekgeschenk, a publication on the occasion of the annual Boekenweek (Dutch Book Week).

In 2004, he won the Woutertje Pieterse Prijs together with Fleur van der Weel for the book Superguppie. In 2016, he also won the Woutertje Pieterse Prijs together with Martijn van der Linden for the book Stem op de okapi.

His books have been illustrated by various illustrators, including Alice Hoogstad, Fleur van der Weel, Martijn van der Linden, Sebastiaan Van Doninck and Sylvia Weve.

== Awards ==
- 1999: Gouden Zoen, Gijsbrecht
- 2000: Gouden Zoen, De dagen van de bluegrassliefde
- 2001: Zilveren Griffel, Dom Konijn
- 2004: Woutertje Pieterse Prijs (with Fleur van der Weel), Superguppie
- 2007: Gouden Zoen, Ons derde lichaam
- 2008: Zilveren Griffel, Eén miljoen vlinders
- 2009: Zilveren Griffel, Opa laat zijn tenen zien
- 2009: Glazen Globe, De gelukvinder
- 2010: Jenny Smelik-IBBY-prijs, De gelukvinder
- 2010: Zilveren Griffel, Fluit zoals je bent
- 2011: Zilveren Griffel, Hoera voor Superguppie!
- 2016: Woutertje Pieterse Prijs (with Martijn van der Linden), Stem op de okapi
- 2019: Zilveren Griffel, Vosje
- 2019: Anna Blaman Prijs
- 2023: De Boon for Children's and youth literature, Misjka (with Anoush Elman and Annet Schaap)
