= Biemann =

Biemann is a German surname. Notable people with the surname include:

- Christoph Biemann (born 1952), German television writer, director, and producer
- Klaus Biemann (1926–2016), Austrian-American biochemist
- Ursula Biemann (born 1955), Swiss video artist, curator and art theorist
