= London Evening News =

19th century newspaper

The London Evening News was an evening newspaper published in London beginning on 14 August 1855. It was cheap, at a halfpenny per issue. It changed its name to The Day but "gave a poor news service", and had failed by 1859.
