= Dorothée Duntze =

French fairy tale illustrator

Dorothée Duntze is a French-born illustrator of fairy tales.

Duntze was born in September 1960 in Reims, France.

== Works ==
- Goodbye Little Bird (c. 1983) by Damjan Mischa and translated by Anthea Bell
- The Princess and the Pea (c. 1985) by Hans Christian Andersen
- Little Daylight (1987) by George MacDonald
- The Golden Goose (c. 1989) adapted by Anthea Bell from original by Jacob and Wilhelm Grimm
- The Twelve Dancing Princesses (1995) translated by Anthea Bell from original by Jacob and Wilhelm Grimm
- The Six Swans translated by Anthea Bell from original by Jacob and Wilhelm Grimm
- Hansel and Gretel (2001) translated by Anthea Bell from original by Jacob and Wilhelm Grimm
- Rapunzel (2005) translated by Anthea Bell from original by Jacob and Wilhelm Grimm
