= Laurens Janszoon Costerprijs =

Dutch literary award

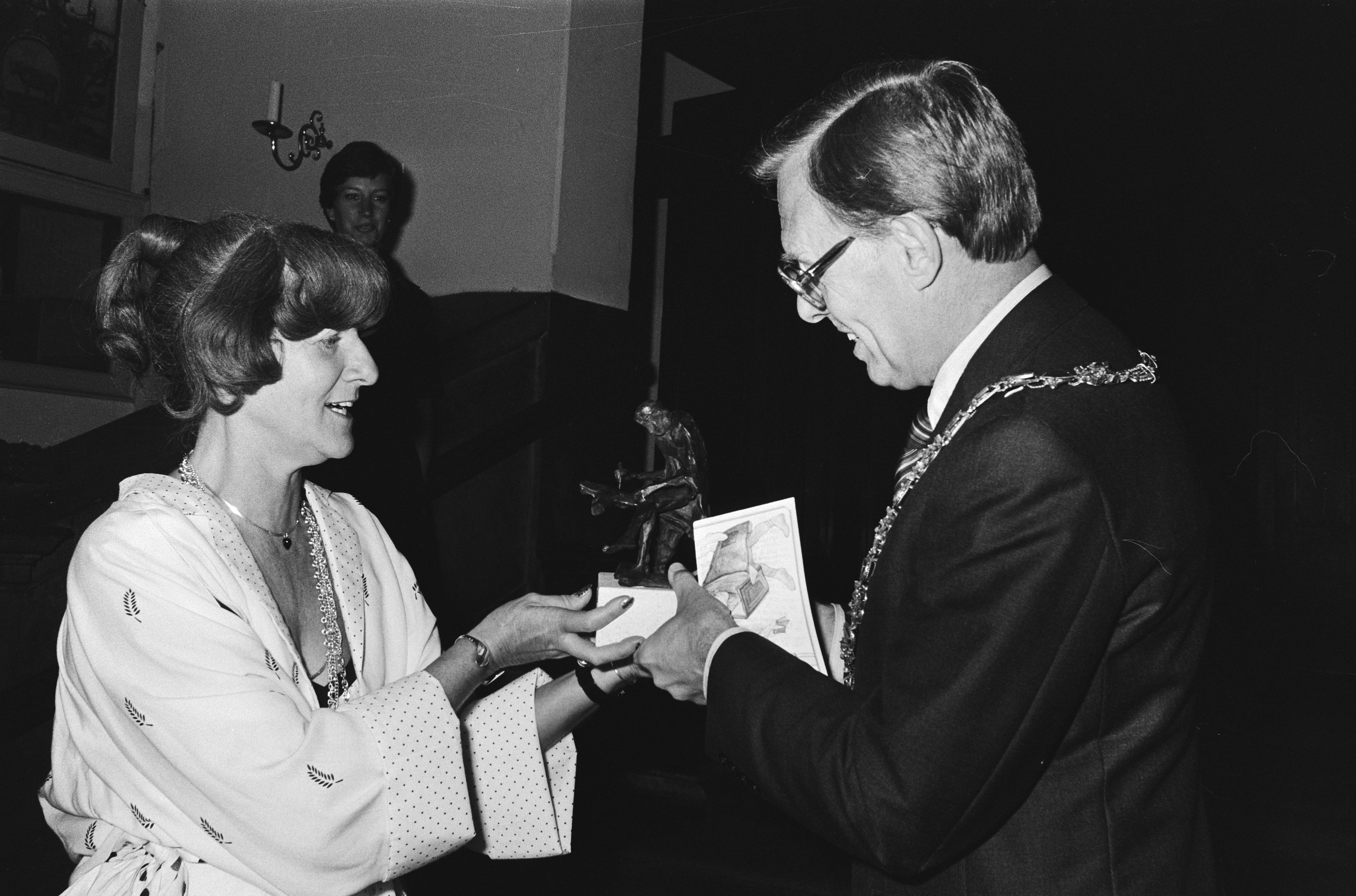
Miep Diekmann receiving the Laurens Janszoon Costerprijs from mayor of Haarlem Jan Reehorst in 1979.

The Laurens Janszoon Costerprijs (Dutch for Laurens Janszoon Coster Prize) is a Dutch literary award given to those who have made a contribution to Dutch literature. The award is named after Dutch purported inventor of a printing press Laurens Janszoon Coster. The award is given by the Stichting Laurens Janszoon Coster organisation, and the award ceremony takes place in Haarlem, the city where Laurens Janszoon Coster was born.

== Winners ==
- 1977: G.A. van Oorschot
- 1978: Jan De Slegte
- 1979: Miep Diekmann
- 1981: Martin Mooy
- 1983: Huib van Krimpen and Stichting Drukwerk in de Marge
- 1985: Uitgeverij Meulenhoff
- 1986: Herman de la Fontaine Verwey
- 1988: Anthon Beeke
- 1991: Wilma Schumacher
- 1995: Joost Ritman
- 1999: Kees Fens
- 2005: Hans Keller
- 2007: Bram de Does
- 2009: Laurens van Krevelen
- 2011: Gerrit Noordzij
- 2013: Not awarded due to lack of funds
