= Gaea Schoeters =

Belgian author (born 1976)

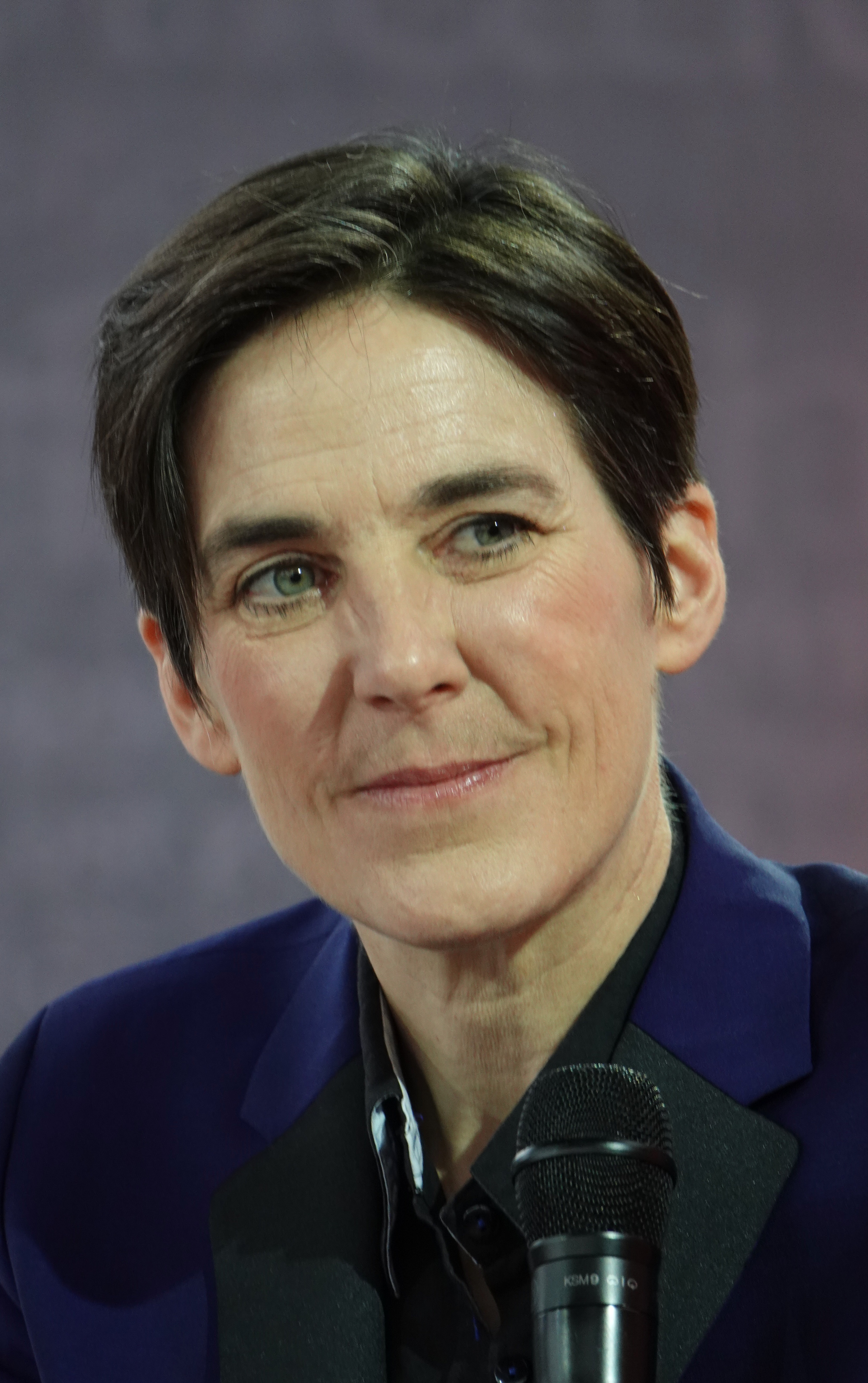
Gaea Schoeters at the Leipzig Book Fair 2024

Gaea Schoeters (Sint-Niklaas, °1976) is a Belgian author. She is best known for her novel Trofee which was nominated for multiple literary prizes including the EU Prize for Literature. Schoeters has also written a number of other books, both fiction and non-fiction. Her very first book Girls, Muslims and Motorcycles was an account of a lengthy motorcycle journey she took through the Middle East and Central Asia. Her other works include novels, a collection of interviews and children's books.

She also writes for the opera and for musical theatre, and her stage work has been performed around Benelux and Europe. She collaborates with other artists such as the illustrator Gerda Dendooven and the composer Annelies Van Parys. She also translates the British poet and writer Kae Tempest.

== Selected works ==
- Girls, Muslims and Motorcycles
- Diggers
- The art of falling
- Untitled #1
- Het Einde
- Trofee
- Nothing
- Het Geschenk
