= Harrie Geelen =

Dutch illustrator, film director and animator (1939–2025)

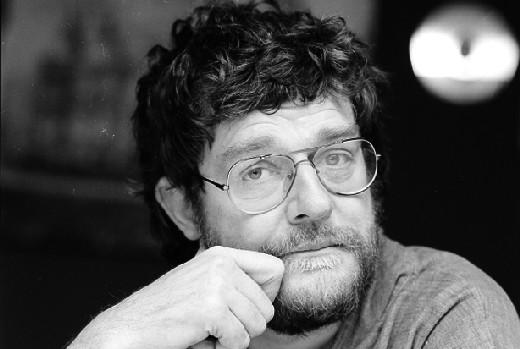
- Born: 10 January 1939; Heerlen, Netherlands
- Died: 30 August 2025 (aged 86); Hilversum, Netherlands
- Occupation(s): Writer, animator, illustrator, scriptwriter, composer, film director, creative director, animator

Harrie Geelen (10 January 1939 – 30 August 2025) was a Dutch illustrator, film director, animator, translator, writer and poet. In 2014, he was made a knight in the Order of the Dutch Lion ("Ridder in de orde van de Nederlandse Leeuw").

Geelen studied Dutch in Amsterdam, where he met his wife Imme Dros, like himself a writer of Dutch children's literature. Geelen wrote several well known television children's programs and translated Disney movies into Dutch. He illustrated his own books and those of his wife Imme Dros, some books by Annie M. G. Schmidt and a book by Toon Tellegen. He published the novel "Het Nijlpaard Ellende" and short stories like "Ooms en Tantes, Tantes en Ooms". For the movie "Pinkeltje" he was the director, designer as well as the scriptwriter. Other work included feature films and a large TV series ("de Sommeltjes") with the use of simple computers.

A lot of his children books were published by Querido. Some of his books are published in Japan, Sweden, and France. The animated documentary about addiction "Getekende Mensen" won a "Gouden Kalf", the Dutch award for outstanding television programmes. Many documentaries made by him at Toonder Studios won prizes in New Work and Paris.

Some of the series he worked on:

- 1968 t/m 1972 – Oebele; dialogue and songs. His wife Imme Dros attributed short stories which Geelen visualised using drawings of children
- 1972 t/m 1976 – Kunt u mij de weg naar Hamelen vertellen, mijnheer?; scenario and songs
- 1974 and 1976 – Q & Q; scenario
- 1981 Pinkeltje – script direction and technical planning
- 1983 – Als je begrijpt wat ik bedoel; director of soundtrack and co-scenarist
- 2002 – Sommeltjes Scripts design animation direction (VPRO)"1996 Carmen & IK – Script songs animation, design and direction (NPS)
- 2003 Annetje Lie in het holst van de nacht – story adapted from the novel of Imme Dros. Script songs animation, design and direction (VPRO)

Geelen died in Hilversum on 30 August 2025, at the age of 86.
