= Carl Norac =

Belgian writer (born 1960)

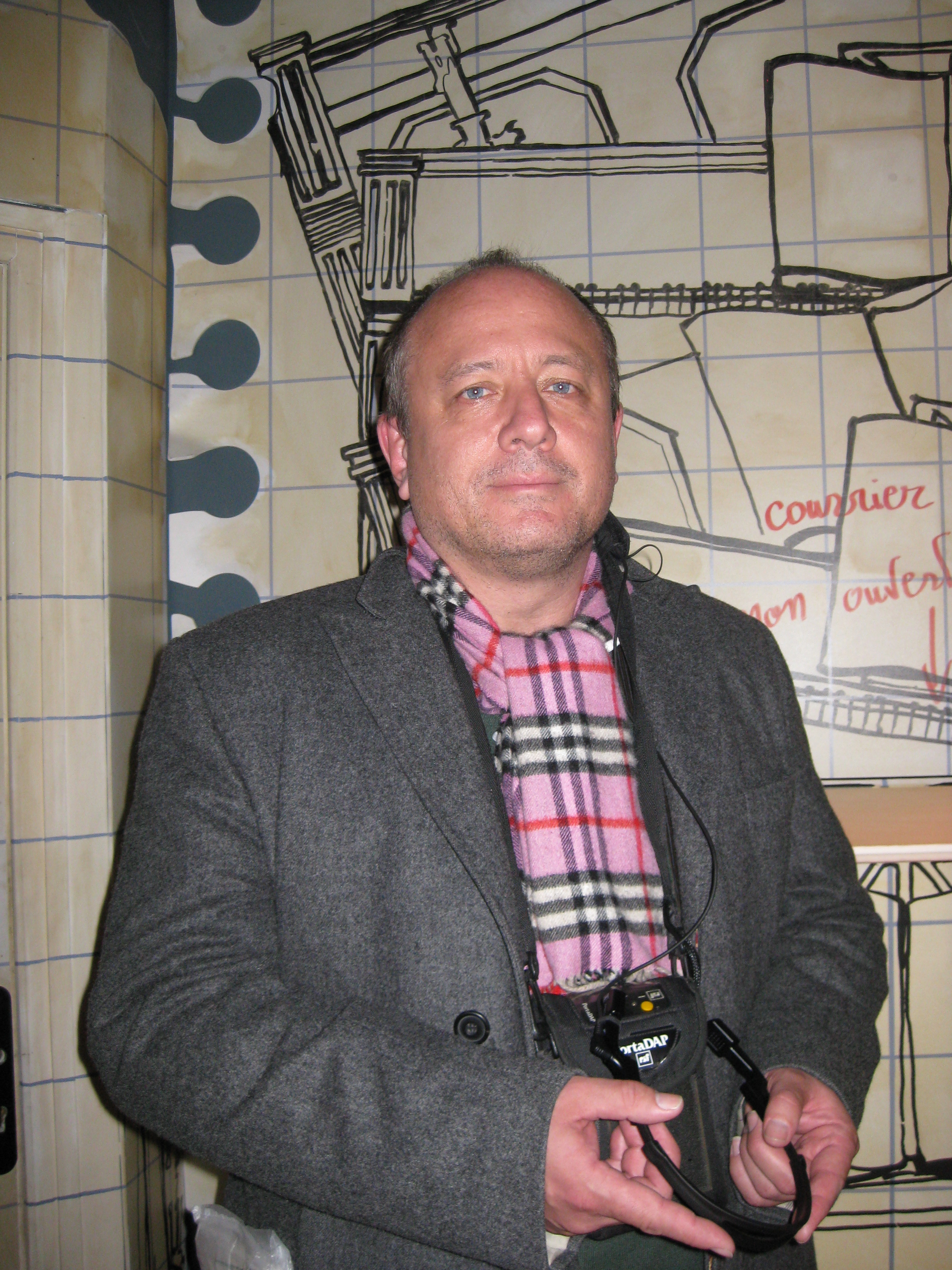
- May 2012
- Born: 29 June 1960 (age 66); Mons, Belgium
- Occupations: children's writer, poet

Carl Norac (born 29 June 1960) is a Walloon Belgian author of children's books and poetry.

== Biography ==
Carl Norac was born in Mons, Belgium in 1960, as the son of poet Pierre Coran and comedian Irène Coran. In 1968, they moved to the small village Erbisoeul, now a part of Jurbise. He studied in Liège and became a teacher of French, but quit after two years. For the next six years, he travelled around the world, while working as a writer. His poetry collection Le maintien du désordre was awarded the Prix Robert Goffin. After witnessing an eruption of the Krakatau in 1993, he published Nemo et le volcan: with illustrations by Louis Joos, which was rewarded the Pomme d'Or, the European illustration award.

In 1996, he became a Professor of Literature at the Royal Conservatorium of Mons, a theatre school. In 1999, he moved to France, and the same year his daughter Else was born. By 2000, he was a full-time writer, mainly creating juvenile illustrated fiction.

== Bibliography ==
=== In English ===
- 1998: I love you so much, Macdonald young books
- 1999: I love to cuddle, Random House
- 2000: Hello sweetie pie, Random House
- 2004: My Daddy is a Giant, ill. Ingrid Godon, Macmillan
- 2006: My Mummy is Magic, ill. Ingrid Godon, Macmillan
- 2007: Tell Me a Story, Mummy, ill. Mei Matsuoka, Macmillan
- 2007: My Grandpa is a Champion, ill. Ingrid Godon, Macmillan
- 2007: Monster, Don't Eat Me!, ill. Carll Cneut, Groundwood Books
- 2008: My Grandma is a Star, ill. Ingrid Godon, Macmillan
- 2009: Big Bear, Little Brother, ill. Kristin Oftedal, Macmillan

=== Complete ===
==== Poetry ====
- 1990: Images en voie d’arrestation, Maison Internationale de la Poésie, Bruxelles.
- 1990: Le maintien du désordre, Caractères, Paris.
- 1993: La politesse des fauves, Éditions l’Arbre à paroles, Amay
- 1994: Dimanche aux Hespérides, Éditions de la Différence, coll. Littérature, Paris.
- 1995: Le voyeur libre, Éditions des Eperonniers, Bruxelles.
- 1996: La candeur, Éditions de la Différence, coll. Littérature, Paris.
- 1998: Le carnet de Montréal, Éditions le Noroît, Montréal.
- 1999: Éloge de la patience, Éditions de la Différence, Paris.
- 2003: Le carnet bleu, Renaissance du livre, Tournai.
- 2003: Métropolitaines, L’escampette, Bordeaux.

==== Youth poetry ====
- 1989: Dis les bruits, with C.Clément and C. Hellings, ill. Dominique Maes, Casterman
- 2003: Lettres du géant à l’enfant qui passe, Espace Nord, Éditions Labor
- 2006: Petites grimaces et grands sourires, ill. Dominique Maes, Lo Païs, Éditions du Rocher

==== Children's literature ====
- 1986: Le fantôme à tics, ill. Marie-José Sacré, Dessain, Liège: translated in German, Catalan, Spanish, Italian, Dutch
- 1986: Bon appétit, Monsieur Logre, ill. Marie-José Sacré, Dessain, Liège: translated in Catalan, Spanish, Italian, Dutch
- 1987: Harpagonne la sorcière, ill. Marie-José Sacré, Dessain, Liège: translated in German, Italian, Dutch
- 1987: Baloum le génie, ill. Marie-José Sacré, Dessain, Liège: translated in Italian
- 1988: Loch Ernest est-il un monstre?, ill. Marie-José Sacré, Dessain, Liège: translated in German, Italian
- 1990: Le chat catastrophe, ill. Marie-José Sacré, Gakken, Tokyo: translated in Japanese
- 1991: Le lion fanfaron, ill. Frédéric Du Bus, Casterman, Tournai
- 1994: Romulus et Rémi, ill. Jean-Claude Hubert, Pastel-Ecole des Loisirs, Paris
- 1995: Coeur de singe, ill. Jean-Claude Hubert, Pastel-Ecole des Loisirs, Paris
- 1995: Nemo et le volcan, ill. Louis Joos, Pastel-Ecole des Loisirs, Paris
- 1996: Un loup dans la nuit bleue, ill. Louis Joos, Pastel-Ecole des Loisirs, Paris
- 1996: Les mots doux, ill. Claude K. Dubois, Pastel-Ecole des Loisirs, Paris: translated in German, English, Catalan, Korean, Spanish, Finnish, Italian, Dutch, Papiamentu
- 1997: Lou dans la Lune, ill. Rita Van Bilsen, Artimini, Brussels
- 1997: Beau comme au cinéma, ill. Louis Joos, Pastel-Ecole des Loisirs, Paris
- 1998: Le sourire de Kiawak, ill. Louis Joos, Pastel-Ecole des Loisirs, Paris: translated in Korean
- 1998: L'espoir pélican, ill. Louis Joos, Pastel-Ecole des Loisirs, Paris
- 1998: L'île aux câlins, ill. Claude K Dubois, Pastel-Ecole des Loisirs, Paris: translated in German, English, Catalan, Spanish, Greek, Japanese, Slovene, Traditional Chinese
- 1998: Panique cosmique, ill. David Merveille, Artimini, Brussels
- 1999: La forêt magique, ill. David Merveille, Artimini, Brussels
- 1999: La Grande Ourse, ill. Kitty Crowther, Pastel-Ecole des Loisirs, Paris: translated in Dutch
- 1999: Bonjour, mon petit cœur, ill. Claude K Dubois, Pastel-Ecole des Loisirs, Paris: translated in German, English, Catalan, Spanish, Finnish, Japanese, Dutch
- 2000: Le message de la baleine, ill. Jean-Luc Englebert, Pastel-Ecole des Loisirs
- 2000: La petite souris d'Halloween, ill. Stibane, Pastel-Ecole des Loisirs, Paris
- 2000: Marine et Louisa, ill. Claude K Dubois, Pastel-Ecole des Loisirs, Paris
- 2000: Le rêve de l'ours, ill. Louis Joos, Pastel- Ecole des Loisirs, Paris
- 2001: Donne-moi un ours, ill. Émile Jadoul, Pastel- École des loisirs: translated in Basque, Catalan, Korean, Spanish
- 2001: Le Père Noël m’a écrit, ill. Kitty Crowther, Pastel-Ecole des loisirs: translated in Korean
- 2001: Je veux un bisou, ill. Claude K. Dubois, Ecole des Loisirs: translated in Catalan, Chinese, Spanish, Japanese
- 2001: Je suis en amour, ill. Claude K. Dubois, Ecole des Loisirs: translated in Catalan, Chinese, Spanish
- 2001: Le printemps de l’ours, ill. Jean-Luc Englebert, Artimini
- 2001: Kuli et le sorcier, ill. Dominique Mwankumi, Archimède-Ecole des loisirs
- 2002: Zeppo, ill. Peter Elliott, Pastel-Ecole des loisirs
- 2002: Tu m’aimes ou tu m’aimes pas?, ill. Claude K Dubois, Pastel-Ecole des loisirs: translated in Chinese, Japanese, Dutch
- 2002: Pierrot d’amour, ill. Jean-Luc Englebert, Pastel-Ecole des loisirs
- 2002: Une visite chez la sorcière, ill. Sophie, Pastel- École des loisirs
- 2003: Akli, prince du désert, ill. Anne-Catherine De Boel, Pastel-Ecole des loisirs
- 2003: Tu es si gentil, mon ours, ill. Anne-Isabelle le Touzé, Pastel-Ecole des loisirs: translated in Danish, Italian
- 2003: Un secret pour grandir, ill. Carll Cneut, Pastel-Ecole des loisirs: translated in Danish, Portuguese
- 2004: Le petit sorcier de la pluie, ill. Anne-Catherine De Boel, Pastel-Ecole des loisirs
- 2004: Coeur de papier, ill. Carll Cneut, Pastel-Ecole des loisirs: translated in Italian, Dutch
- 2004: Angakkeq, la légende de l’oiseau-homme, ill. Louis Joos, Pastel-Ecole des loisirs
- 2004: Mon papa est un géant, ill. Ingrid Godon, Bayard Editions: translated in English, German, Catalan, Dutch, Swedish
- 2004: Tout près de Maman, ill. Catherine Pineur, Pastel-Ecole des loisirs
- 2005: Mon meilleur ami du monde, ill. Claude K Dubois, Pastel
- 2005: Sentimento, ill. Rebecca Dautremer, Bilboquet
- 2005: Le Géant de la Grande Tour, ill. Ingrid Godon, Sarbacane
- 2005: Petit bonheur, ill. Eric Battut, Bilboquet
- 2006: Et maintenant, qu’est-ce qu’on fait?, ill. Kristien Aertssen, Editions Pastel- L’Ecole des loisirs
- 2006: Monstre, ne me mange pas!, ill. Carll Cneut, Editions Pastel- L’Ecole des loisirs
- 2006: La Vie en Bleu, ill. Stéphane Poulin, Editions Pastel- L’Ecole des loisirs
- 2006: Monsieur Satie, l’homme qui avait un petit piano dans la tête, ill. Elodie Nouhen, Éditions Didier Jeunesse

==== Youth novels ====
- 2002: Le dernier voyage de Saint-Exupéry, ill. Louis Joos, La Renaissance du Livre
- 2004: Ogronimo et la très petite sorcière, ill. Catherine Fradire, Magnard
- 2005: Le magicien des ombres, ill. Karen Laborie, collection Tipik, Magnard

==== Theatre ====
- 1999: Le Carnaval des animaux, sur une musique de Saint-Saëns, ill. Gabriel Lefèbvre, Editions de l'Opéra de la Monnaie, Brussels
- 1999: Monsieur Pwoët, Editions du Cerisier, Cuesmes

==== Non fiction ====
- 1994: Le canal du centre: quand les bateaux prennent l’ascenseur, ill. J. P. Galliez, Casterman, coll. l’histoire à la trace

==== Comics ====
- 1990: A toi de jouer, Diogène, ill. Bernard Godi, Casterman, Tournai
