= Boekenpauw =

Belgian illustration award

- Native name: Yvonne Gillé-Decoeneprijs
- Description: Flemish literary award presented to a Flemish or Dutch illustrator for the best illustrations in a children's book
- Country: Belgium
- Presented by: Boek.be

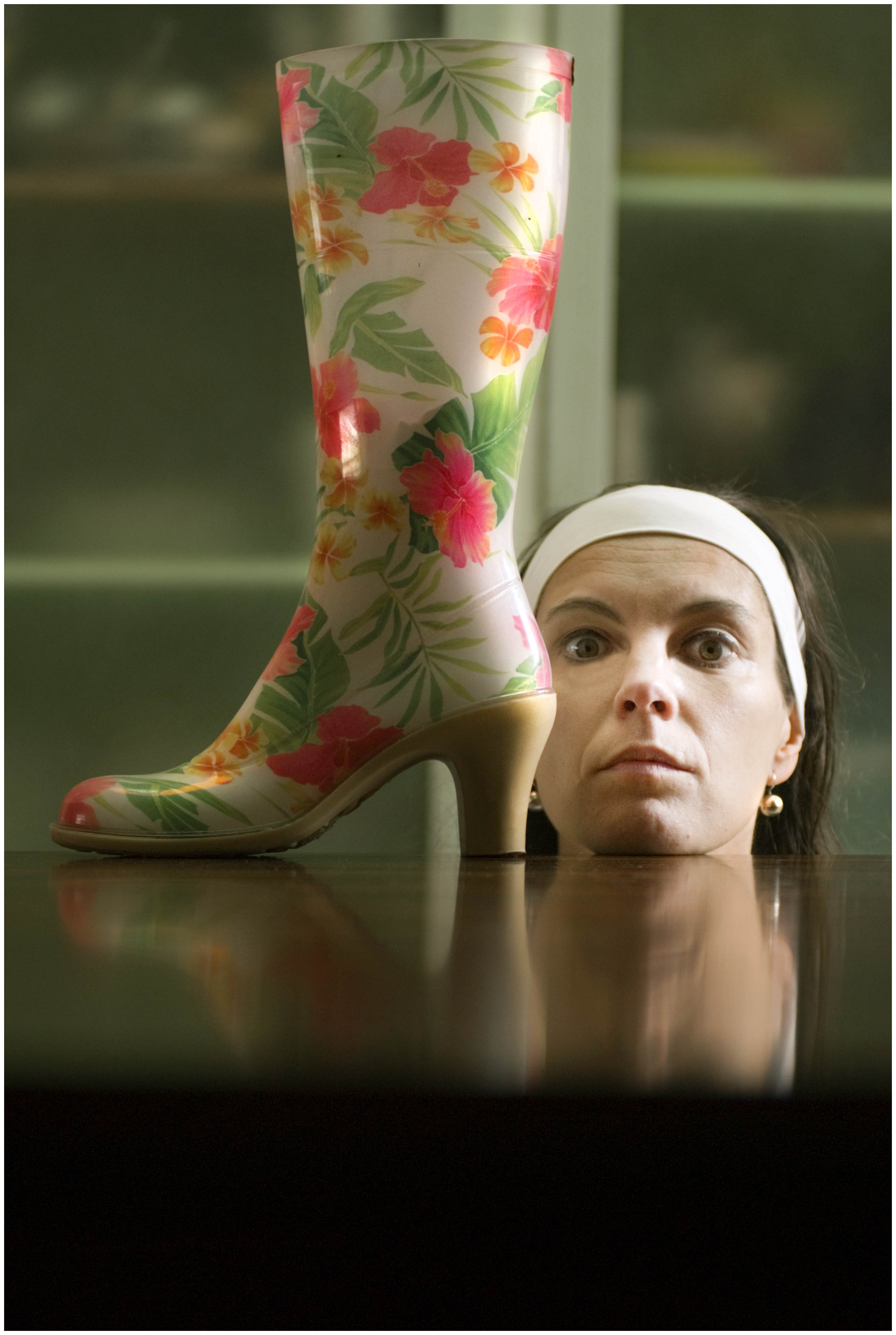
Gerda Dendooven has won the award four times.

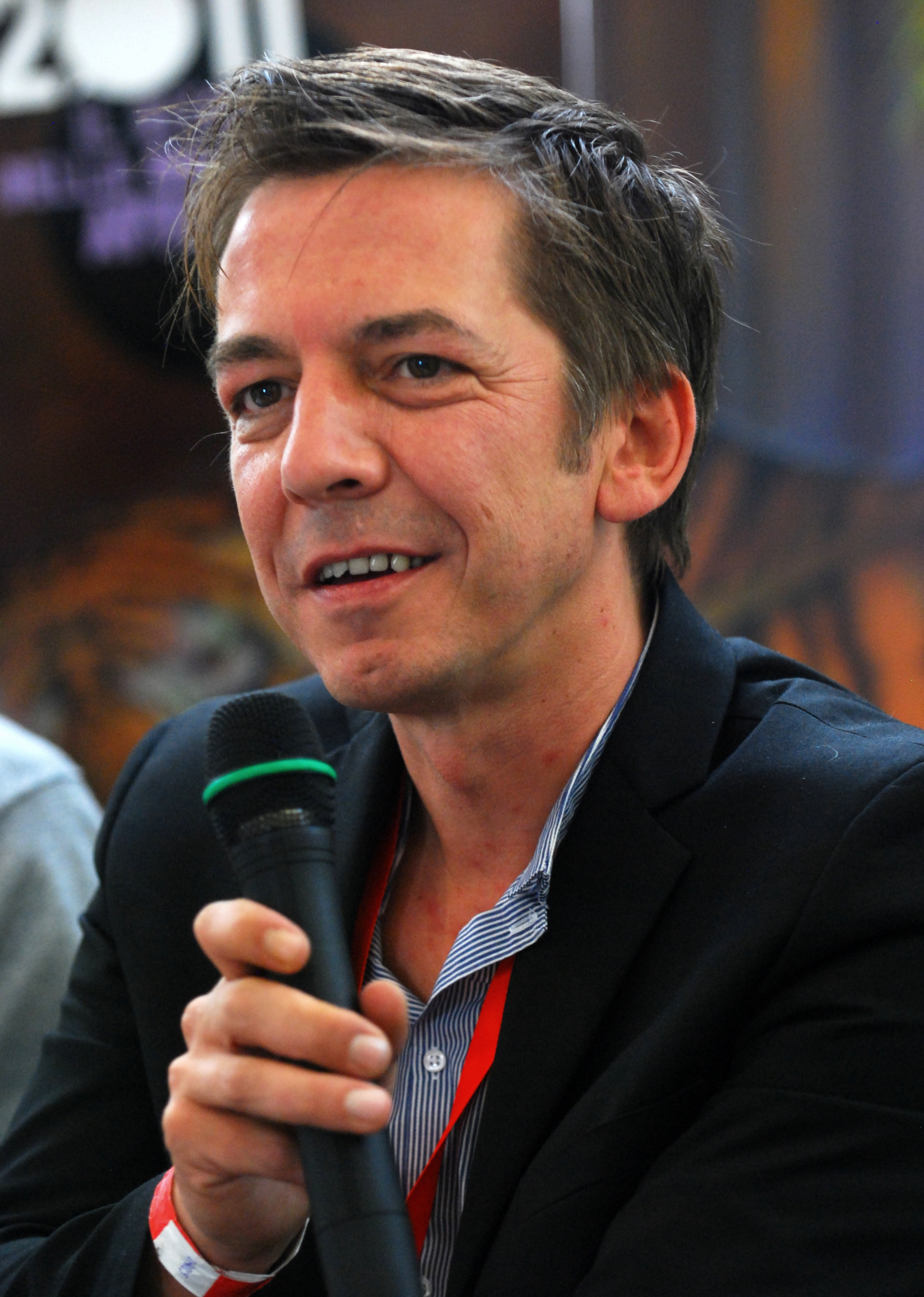
Carll Cneut has won the award twice.

The Boekenpauw, also known as the Yvonne Gillé-Decoeneprijs, is a Flemish award for a Flemish or Dutch illustrator for the best illustrations in a children's book. The award is given by Boek.be and the winner receives €2,500.

== History ==
The Boekenpauw and Boekenpluim awards were established in 1989.

The award was not given in 2017 due to reorganisation at Boek.be and due to reassessment of what awards the organisation would continue to support. The award was given again in 2018 sponsored by association of authors, composers and publishers SABAM and GAU (Groep Algemene Uitgevers).

Gerda Dendooven won the Boekenpauw four times: in 1990, 1995, 2002 and 2007. Several illustrators have won the Boekenpauw twice: Carll Cneut (2000 and 2004), Goele Dewanckel (1999 and 2005), Ingrid Godon (2001 and 2015), Tom Schamp (2008 and 2013) en André Sollie (1998 and 2010).

== Winners ==
- 1989: Koen Fossey, Moet je echt weg
- 1990: Gerda Dendooven, IJsjes
- 1991: Roland Vandenbussche (posthumously), Met weinig eerbied. Museumgids voor jongeren
- 1992: Geert Vervaeke, Puntje puntje puntje
- 1993: Lieve Baeten, Nieuwsgierige Lotje
- 1994: Kristien Aertssen, Tante Nans zat op een gans
- 1995: Gerda Dendooven, Strikjes in de Struiken
- 1996: Anne Westerduin, Een koekje voor Blekkie
- 1997: Marjolein Pottie, Muu
- 1998: André Sollie, De brief die Rosie vond
- 1999: Goele Dewanckel, Zeg me dat het niet zal sneeuwen
- 2000: Carll Cneut, Willy
- 2001: Ingrid Godon, Wachten op Matroos
- 2002: Gerda Dendooven, Meneer Papier gaat uit wandelen
- 2003: Klaas Verplancke, Heksje Paddenwratje
- 2004: Carll Cneut, Mijnheer Ferdinand
- 2005: Goele Dewanckel, Het mooie meisje
- 2006: Isabelle Vandenabeele, Mijn schaduw en ik
- 2007: Gerda Dendooven, Het verhaal van slimme Krol. En hoe hij aan de dood ontsnapte
- 2008: Tom Schamp, De 6de dag
- 2009: Sabien Clement, En iedereen ging op zijn mieren zitten
- 2010: André Sollie, De Zomerzot
- 2011: Ellen Vrijsen, Cantecleir
- 2012: Leo Timmers, Boem
- 2013: Tom Schamp, Het leukste abc ter wereld
- 2014: Anton Van Hertbruggen, Het hondje dat Nino niet had
- 2015: Ingrid Godon, Ik denk
- 2016: Kitty Crowther, Mama Medusa
- 2017: Not awarded
- 2018: Marit Törnqvist, Het gelukkige eiland
- 2019: Kaatje Vermeire, Ans & Wilma verdwaald
- 2020: Sebastiaan Van Doninck, De fantastische vliegwedstrijd
