= Gerda Dendooven =

Belgian illustrator

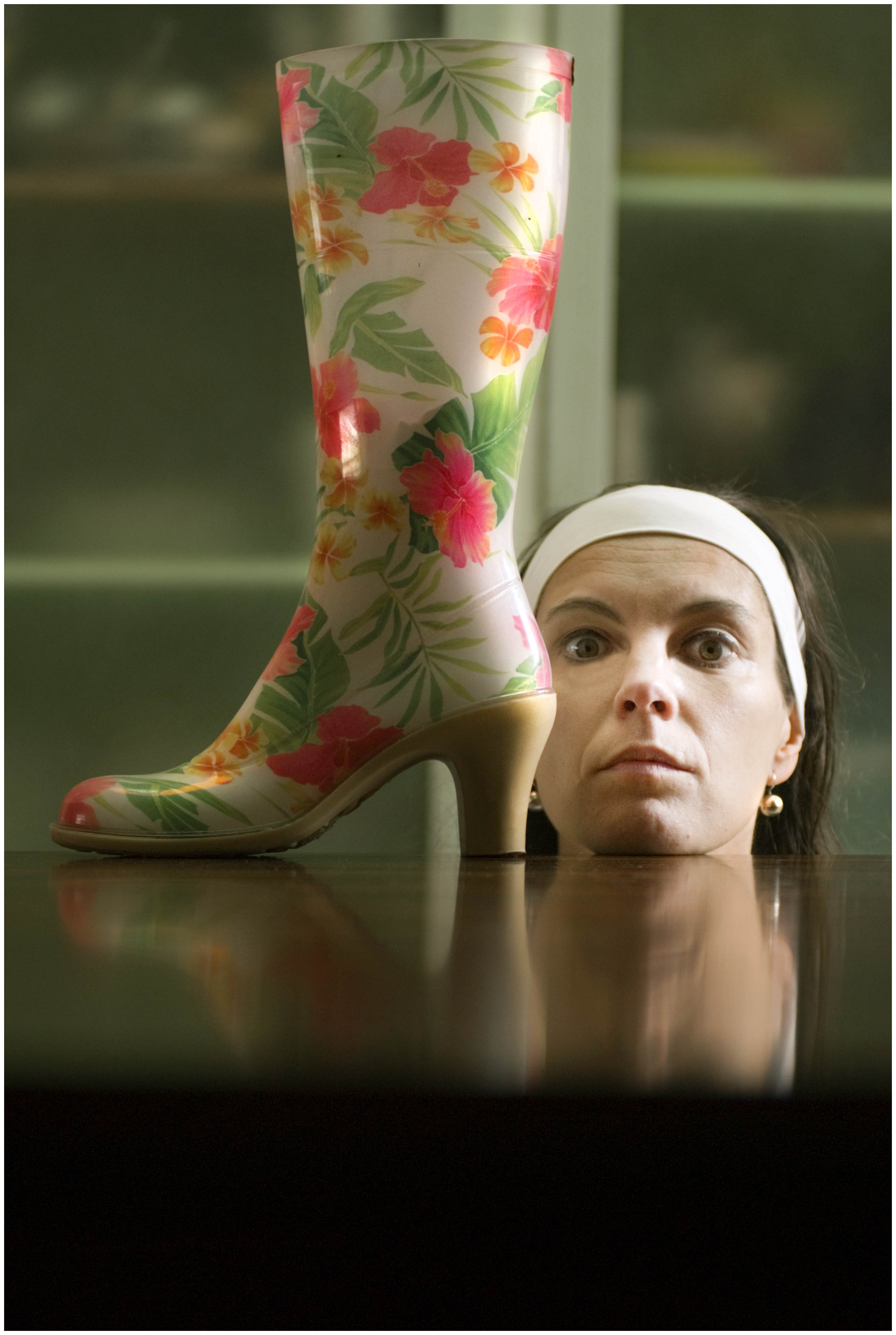
- Gerda Dendooven (2006)
- Born: 10 May 1962 (age 64); Kortrijk, Belgium
- Known for: Illustration
- Awards: Boekenpauw 1990 IJsjes 1995 Strikjes in de Struiken 2002 Meneer Papier gaat uit wandelen 2007 Het verhaal van Slimme Krol; Gouden Uil 2001 Luna van de boom; Woutertje Pieterse Prijs 2017 Stella, ster van de zee

Gerda Dendooven (born 10 May 1962) is a Belgian illustrator. She has won numerous awards for her work, including the Gouden Uil, the Woutertje Pieterse Prijs and the Boekenpauw on several occasions.

== Early life ==
Dendooven was born in 1962 in Marke, Belgium. She studied Vrije Grafiek at the Royal Academy of Fine Arts in Ghent.

== Career ==
=== Children's literature ===
In 1987, she illustrated her first children's book Geen gezoen, vlug opendoen by Ed Franck. Dendooven went on to illustrate many books by many different authors, including Herman Brusselmans, Toon Tellegen and Bart Moeyaert. Other authors include Elvis Peeters, Michael De Cock and Wally De Doncker.

In 1996, she was nominated for the Hans Christian Andersen Award. Dendooven also won several awards for books that she wrote and illustrated herself, such as IJsjes (for which she won a Boekenpauw in 1990), Soepkinders (for which she won a Boekenpluim in 2006) and Hoe het varken aan zijn krulstaart kwam (for which she won both a Zilveren Griffel and Boekenpluim in 2010).

She won the Vlag en Wimpel award in 1998 for illustrating the book Nietes welles and in 2015 for writing the book De wondertuin.

In 2017, she won the Woutertje Pieterse Prijs for her book Stella, ster van de zee. She was also nominated for this award in 2015 and 2016.

=== Theatre ===
Dendooven has also written various texts for stage plays. In 2001, she participated in the play Bremen is niet ver in collaboration with Geert Hautekiet, Bart Moeyaert and Ianka Fleerackers.

== Personal life ==
Dendooven is in a relationship with typographist and designer Gert Dooreman and they have two daughters.

== Awards ==
- 1990: Prijs van de Kinder- en Jeugdjury voor het boek in Vlaanderen, Met de kont tegen de krib
- 1990: Boekenpauw, IJsjes
- 1992: Prijs van de Kinder- en Jeugdjury voor het boek in Vlaanderen, De meester is een schat
- 1995: Boekenpauw, Strikjes in de Struiken
- 1995: Prijs van de Kinder- en Jeugdjury voor het boek in Vlaanderen, Prins Pukkel
- 1998: Vlag en Wimpel, Nietes welles
- 2000: Zilveren Penseel, De verliefde prins
- 2000: Boekenpluim, De verliefde prins
- 2001: Gouden Uil, Luna van de boom (with Bart Moeyaert and Filip Bral)
- 2002: Boekenpauw, Meneer Papier gaat uit wandelen
- 2004: Vlag en Wimpel, Meneer Papier is verscheurd
- 2004: Prijs van de Vlaamse Gemeenschap voor Jeugdliteratuur, Mijn mama
- 2006: Boekenpluim, Soepkinders
- 2007: Boekenpauw, Het verhaal van Slimme Krol. En hoe hij aan de dood ontsnapte
- 2010: Zilveren Griffel, Hoe het varken aan zijn krulstaart kwam
- 2010: Boekenpluim, Hoe het varken aan zijn krulstaart kwam
- 2013: Zilveren Palet, Takkenkind
- 2013: Boekenwelp, Takkenkind
- 2015: Vlag en Wimpel, De wondertuin
- 2017: Woutertje Pieterse Prijs, Stella, ster van de zee
