= De Eenhoorn (publisher) =

Flemish publishing house

- Status: Active
- Founded: 1990
- Founder: Bart Desmyter
- Country of origin: Belgium
- Headquarters location: Wielsbeke, Belgium
- Official website: www.eenhoorn.be

De Eenhoorn is a Flemish independent publishing house based in Wielsbeke, Belgium. The company's focus is on children's literature, picture books and poetry collections for children. The company also publishes a range of books for adults.

== History ==
The company was founded in 1990.

The company has published many books by Dutch and Flemish authors and illustrators. Many received Flemish awards for their publications, such as the Boekenleeuw, Boekenpauw, Boekenwelp and Boekenpluim awards. Some publications also won awards abroad, such as the Woutertje Pieterse Prijs, the Gouden Griffel award as well as the Zilveren Griffel awards in the Netherlands as well as Plaques at the Biennial of Illustration Bratislava.

The company has published the books of Dutch and Flemish authors, such as Brigitte Minne, Edward van de Vendel, Geert De Kockere, Frank Geleyn, Tine Mortier and Koen D'haene. The company has worked with illustrators such as Carll Cneut, Klaas Verplancke, Sebastiaan Van Doninck, Marjolein Pottie, Kristien Aertssen, An Candaele, Jan De Kinder, Tom Schamp, Isabelle Vandenabeele, Esther Platteeuw, Nathalie Segers and Ann De Bode.

The company also publishes two children's magazines: Kits for 10 – 14 year olds and Klap for 8 – 10 year olds.
