= Timmers =

Timmers is a surname. Notable people with the surname include:

- Erwin Timmers
- Leo Timmers (born 1970), Belgian children's book writer and illustrator
- Pieter Timmers (born 1988), Belgian freestyle swimmer
- Ron Timmers (born 1973), Dutch football player and manager
