= Koen Fossey =

Belgian illustrator

- Born: 30 June 1953 (age 73); Anderlecht, Belgium
- Known for: Illustration
- Awards: Boekenpauw 1989 Moet je echt weg

Koen Fossey (born 30 June 1953) is a Belgian illustrator.

== Career ==
He won the Prijs van de Vlaamse Provincies in 1983 for his picture book Het spoortje in het bos.

Fossey received the Prijs van de Kinder- en Jeugdjury voor het boek in Vlaanderen several times for illustrating various books written by Ed Franck: in 1986 for the book Spetters op de kermis, in 1987 for Tenten in de wei, in 1989 for De witte muur and in 1990 for Wie wil Wubbe weg.

In 1989, he won the very first Boekenpauw award for illustrating the book Moet je echt weg, also written by Ed Franck.

== Awards ==
- 1983: Prijs van de Vlaamse Provincies, Het spoortje in het bos
- 1986: Prijs van de Kinder- en Jeugdjury voor het boek in Vlaanderen, Spetters op de kermis
- 1987: Prijs van de Kinder- en Jeugdjury voor het boek in Vlaanderen, Tenten in de wei
- 1989: Prijs van de Kinder- en Jeugdjury voor het boek in Vlaanderen, De witte muur
- 1989: Boekenpauw, Moet je echt weg
- 1990: Prijs van de Kinder- en Jeugdjury voor het boek in Vlaanderen, Wie wil Wubbe weg?
