= North Sea Texas =

2011 Belgian film by Bavo Defurne

- Theatrical release poster
- Dutch: Noordzee, Texas
- Directed by: Bavo Defurne
- Screenplay by: Bavo Defurne; Yves Verbraeken
- Based on: Nooit gaat dit over by André Sollie
- Produced by: Yves Verbraeken
- Starring: Jelle Florizoone; Eva Van Der Gucht; Mathias Vergels; Nina Marie Kortekaas; Luk Wyns
- Cinematography: Anton Mertens
- Edited by: Els Voorspoels
- Music by: Adriano Cominotto
- Production companies: Indeed Films; Mollywood; Eén; The Flanders Audiovisual Fund
- Distributed by: Kinepolis (Belgium); Cinemien (Netherlands); Strand Releasing (USA); Peccadillo Pictures (UK); Wavelength Pictures
- Release dates: March 16, 2011 (Belgium); November 2, 2012 (United States)
- Running time: 98 minutes
- Country: Belgium
- Language: Dutch
- Box office: $58,436

North Sea Texas (Dutch: Noordzee, Texas) is a 2011 Belgian drama romance film directed by Bavo Defurne in his feature directorial debut, who co-wrote the script with Yves Verbraeken, based on André Sollie's Nooit gaat dit over. The film stars Jelle Florizoone, Mathias Vergels, and Eva Van Der Gucht. The film follows Pim (Florizoone) falling in love with his best friend, Gino (Vergels).

== Plot ==
A young Pim and his mother, Yvette, live in the Belgian countryside with their dog, a Miniature Pinscher named Mirza. The mother, a lonely divorcee, plays a piano accordion, and patronizes a local bar called Texas. One day Pim and his mother attend a fair, where they meet a traveling carny named Zoltan. Zoltan is kind to the younger Pim, and Pim is infatuated. Zoltan rents a room in Yvette's home intermittently, but later stops coming to town. Meanwhile, Yvette begins spending time with a man named Etienne, who is brutish and macho, and whom Pim immediately despises.

As time passes, Pim develops a close friendship with the slightly older Gino, who becomes his best friend. Pim falls in love with Gino, and Gino explores his sexuality with the adoring Pim, and the two become increasingly intimate. They both agree to keep their sexual relationship a secret. Meanwhile, Gino's sister Sabrina develops feelings for Pim, and Gino nearly spends the night with a girl he is seeing named Françoise. Pim, seeing Gino kiss Françoise, commits an act of vandalism as revenge and a rift forms between the two friends. Sabrina subsequently finds out that Pim is gay, and Yvette breaks it off with the boorish Etienne. Around this time, the enigmatic Zoltan unexpectedly returns. Gino, growing uncomfortable with the complicated circumstances, begins pushing Pim away. Compounding the emotional roller coaster for Pim, he goes to Zoltan's room one evening, hoping to spend the night with him, only to find Zoltan out of his room and down the hall having sex with Pim's mother. Having long wanted Zoltan for himself, even before he fell in love with Gino, a distraught Pim runs off into the night. Devastated that he cannot be with Zoltan, he returns home to find his mother has left with Zoltan and left him a note. Pim takes Mirza and moves in with Sabrina, while Gino is living out of town with Françoise.

Following the funeral of Gino's and Sabrina's mother Marcella, Pim and Sabrina are seen living together, although the living arrangement is clearly platonic. On a rainy day, Gino returns. After Pim tells Gino that his sister isn't home, Gino tells Pim that it was he whom Gino came home for. Gino gently grabs Pim and moves him against the wall. Gino returns a cloth with special meaning to them both to Pim, telling him to tie a knot in it so that he will never forget him. He then proceeds to kiss Pim on the neck and the two embrace one another passionately. Pim tells Gino to "stay," and the film ends with the two of them embracing each other, suggesting a happy ending for the young couple.

== Cast ==
- Jelle Florizoone as Pim
- Eva Van Der Gucht as Yvette
- Mathias Vergels as Gino
- Nina Marie Kortekaas as Sabrina
- Katelijne Damen as Marcella
- Luk Wyns as Etienne
- Thomas Coumans as Zoltan
- Ben Van den Heuvel as Young Pim
- Patricia Goemaere as Simone
- Nathan Naenen as Young Gino
- Noor Ben Taout as Young Sabrina
- Ella-June Henrard as Françoise
- Daniel Sikora as Maurice
- Victor Zaidi as Julien

== Music ==
"Paper Wings"

Single by Little Auk

from the album Paper Wings (Music from The Motion Picture North Sea Texas)
- Language: Dutch
- Released: April 25, 2012
- Length: 3:32
- Label: Indeed Films

"Wooly Clouds"

Single by Little Auk

from the album Wooly Clouds (Music from The Motion Picture North Sea Texas)
- Language: Dutch
- Released: April 25, 2012
- Length: 3:12
- Label: Indeed Films

== Critical reception ==
The film received positive reviews from film critics. Review aggregator Rotten Tomatoes reports that 83% out of 29 professional critics gave the film a positive review. Henry Barnes from The Guardian said that "North Sea Texas looks beautiful, is acted brilliantly, but it's hard to get a hold on when Pim's drifting by in a dream world." Allan Hunter from the Daily Express called it "A delicate little heartwarmer of a film."

Ignatiy Vishnevetsky of the Chicago Sun-Times panned it, and compared the film to the director's previous efforts: “So why is it that Campfire is engrossing, while North Sea Texas is frequently dull?” Vishnevetsky notes this is Bavo Defurne's first feature-length film, having made short films since 1990, and Defurne fails to develop the characters or story with the extra time.

== Awards ==
At the 2011 edition of the Montreal World Film Festival, the film received two prizes: the "Silver Zenith for the First Fiction Feature Film" and the "Fipresci Prize for a film in the First Films Competition". In late October, the film premiered at the Rome International Film Festival. It was warmly welcomed there, receiving the Marc'Aurelio Alice nella Città 13 + Award of the Festival.

In January, the film was selected for the Palm Springs International Film Festival, along with four other Flemish films. It was released in the United States by Strand Releasing, after it bought the film rights to Wavelength Pictures.

The film was also screened at the London Lesbian and Gay Film Festival and was released April 6, 2012 in the UK. In 2013 it was screened in the Tel Aviv International LGBT Film Festival, TLVFest.

== Home media ==
North Sea Texas was released on DVD in the United Kingdom (Region 2) on 6 August 2012 from Peccadillo Pictures. It was made available in the United States (Region 1) on 19 February 2013 via Strand Releasing.

The film became came available on Blu-ray in France ("Sur le chemin des dunes") on 2 May 2013 from Outplay distribution, a company that specializes in LGBT-themed movies. The Collector's Edition set also contains the DVD. In the UK, Saffron Hill distribution released the film on 10 February 2014 in a double play set also featuring the DVD.
