= Dessain =

Dessain is a surname of Normandy origins. Notable people with the surname include:

- Émile François Dessain (1808–1882), French painter
- Pierre Dessain (1837–1913), Catholic printer-publisher and politician for the Catholic Party
- Karel Dessain (1871–1944), Belgian printer and politician and son of the above
- Francis Dessain (1875–1951), Belgian lawyer, priest, and footballer and brother of the above

== See also ==
- Alexis Dessaint (1847–1890), lawyer and political figure in Quebec
