= Carll Cneut =

Flemish illustrator

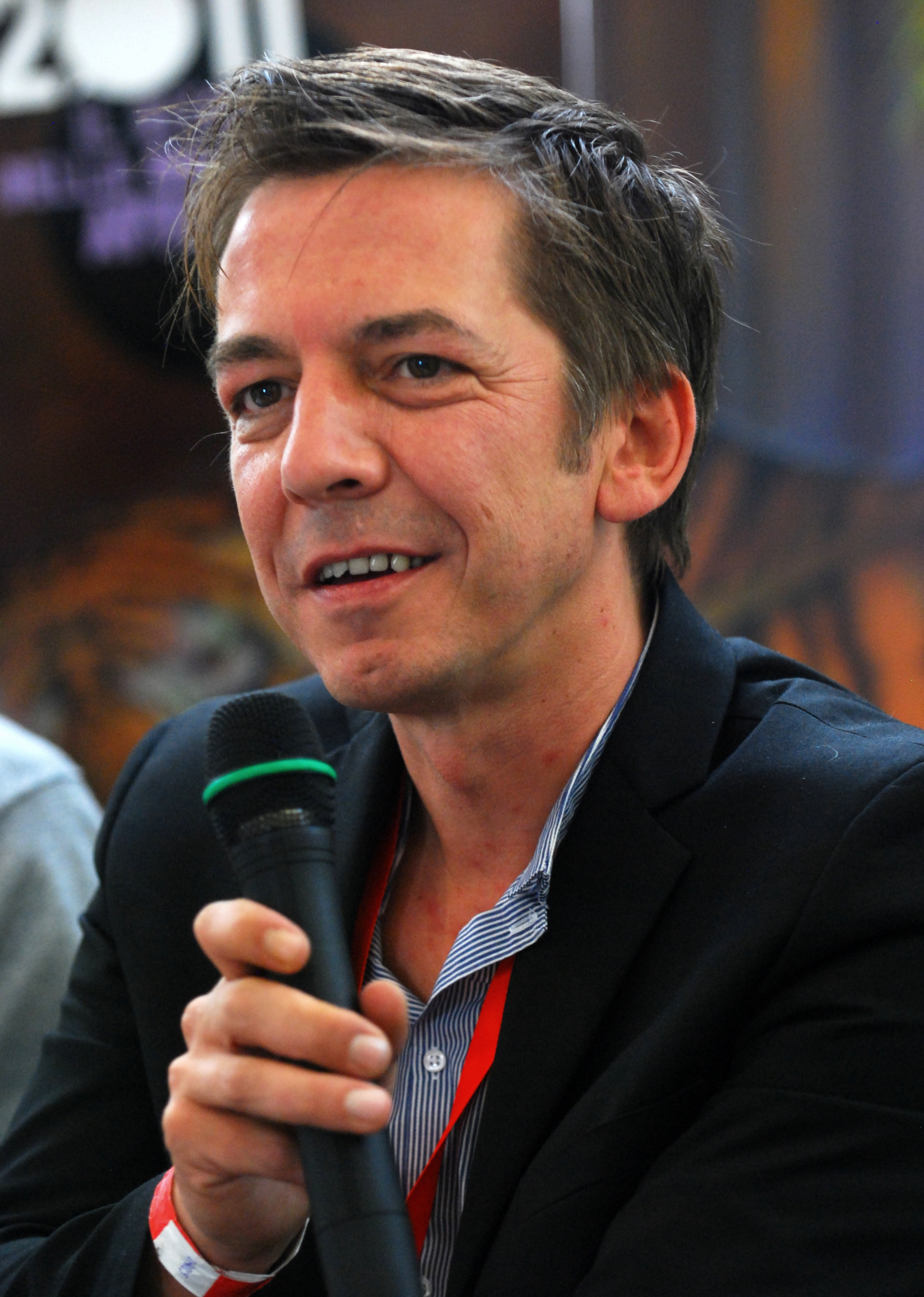
- Carll Cneut (2011)
- Born: 8 January 1969 (age 56); Roeselare, Belgium

Carll Cneut (born 8 January 1969) is a Flemish illustrator. He has illustrated many books by Dutch and Flemish authors and he has received numerous awards for his work.

== Early life ==
Cneut studied graphic design at the Sint-Lucas School in Ghent, Belgium.

== Career ==
Cneut made his debut with his illustrations in the poetry collection Varkentjes van marsepein written by Geert De Kockere.

He won the Boekenpauw award twice: in 2000 for illustrating the book Willy written by Geert De Kockere and in 2004 for illustrating the book Mijnheer Ferdinand written by Agnes Guldemont.

In 2002, he published the book Het ongelooflijke liefdesverhaal van Heer Morf which he wrote as well as illustrated. In 2003, he won the Eselsohr award, the Zilveren Penseel and the Prix d'Illustration Jeunesse for this book. At the Biennial of Illustration Bratislava he won a Golden Plaque in 2003 for the illustrations this book as well as the illustrations in the book Mijnheer Ferdinand, written by Agnes Guldemont. He also won this award in 2005 for the book Dulle Griet.

In 2009, he won the Woutertje Pieterse Prijs together with Peter Verhelst for the book Het geheim van de keel van de nachtegaal, an adaptation of The Nightingale by Hans Christian Andersen. He also received the Boekenpluim award for this book. Verhelst won the Gouden Griffel award for this book as well as a Boekenwelp.

In 2015, he won the Boekenpluim award for illustrating the book De gouden kooi written by Anna Castagnoli.

Cneut has illustrated books by many authors over the years, including Edward van de Vendel, Ed Franck, Carl Norac and Brigitte Minne. He has also created illustrations for The New York Times. Much of his work has been published by De Eenhoorn.

== Awards ==
- 2000: Boekenpauw, Willy (written by Geert De Kockere)
- 2000: White Raven Award, Heksenfee
- 2001: Bologna Ragazzi Award Special Mention, Woeste Mie
- 2002: Boekenpluim, Roodgeelzwartwit
- 2002: Prix Octogones, Roodgeelzwartwit
- 2003: Eselsohr, Het ongelooflijke liefdesverhaal van Heer Morf
- 2003: Zilveren Penseel, Het ongelooflijke liefdesverhaal van Heer Morf
- 2003: Prix d'Illustration Jeunesse, Het ongelooflijke liefdesverhaal van Heer Morf
- 2003: Golden Plaque Bratislava, Het ongelooflijke liefdesverhaal van Heer Morf and Mijnheer Ferdinand
- 2004: White Raven Award, Mijnheer Ferdinand
- 2004: Boekenpauw, Mijnheer Ferdinand (written by Agnes Guldemont)
- 2005: Golden Plaque Bratislava, Dulle Griet
- 2007: Picturale Prestige Prijs, Eén miljoen vlinders
- 2009: Woutertje Pieterse Prijs, Het geheim van de keel van de nachtegaal (with Peter Verhelst)
- 2009: Boekenpluim, Het geheim van de keel van de nachtegaal
- 2009: White Raven Award Special Mention, Het geheim van de keel van de nachtegaal
- 2009: Plantin-Moretus Publieksprijs, Het geheim van de keel van de nachtegaal
- 2010: Boekenpluim, Fluit zoals je bent
- 2010: Zilveren Penseel, Fluit zoals je bent
- 2015: Boekenpluim, De gouden kooi
- 2017: Prijs Letterkunde van de Provincie West-Vlaanderen, De gouden kooi
