= Kitty Crowther =

Belgian writer and illustrator (born 1970)

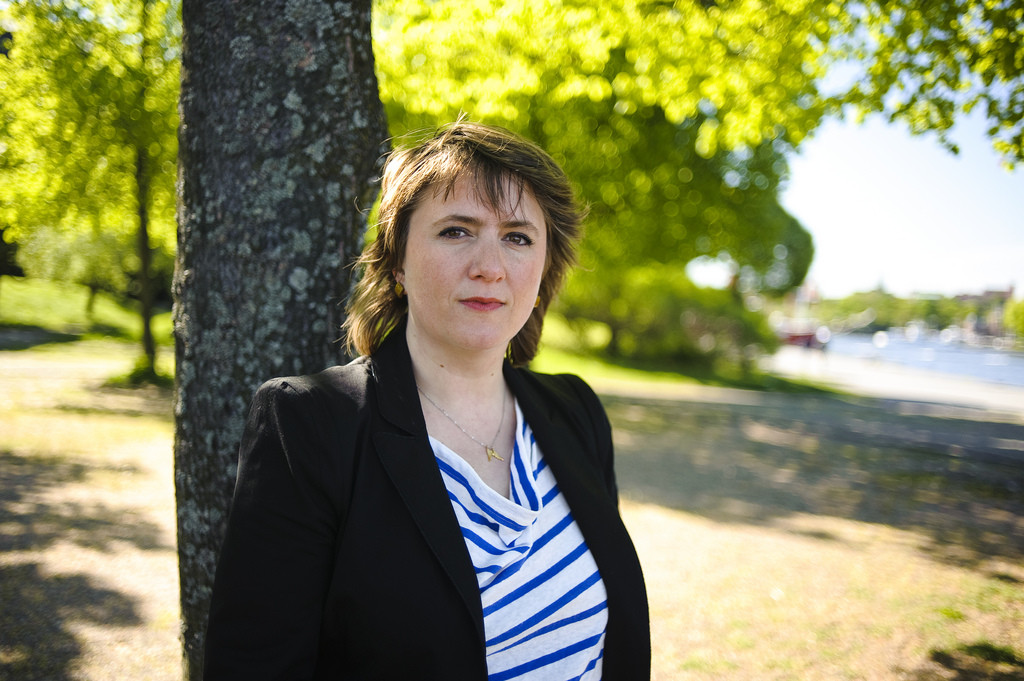
- Born: 4 April 1970 (age 56); Uccle, Belgium
- Education: Institut Saint-Luc
- Occupations: Illustrator and writer of children's books
- Children: 2
- Writing career
- Notable awards: 1997 "Vlag en Wimpel"; 2003 Silver Pencil; 2005 Silver Pencil; 2010 Astrid Lindgren Memorial Award

Kitty Crowther (born 4 April 1970) is a Belgian illustrator and writer of children's books. For her career contribution to "children's and young adult literature in the broadest sense" she won the 2010 Astrid Lindgren Memorial Award from the Swedish Arts Council, the biggest prize in children's literature.

== Biography ==
Kitty Crowther is the Belgian daughter of a British father and a Swedish mother. She was born and grew up in Uccle, part of Brussels, in Belgium. She and her husband now live in Blanmont with their two sons. She studied Graphic Arts at the Institut Saint-Luc in Brussels. She works mainly in French, occasionally in Dutch, and has as of 2010 created some 35 books of her own, and has illustrated books of others as well, e.g. work by Carl Norac, Bart Moeyaert and Toon Tellegen.

She made her debut in 1994 with Mon royaume (My kingdom). The jury of the Gouden Griffel awarded her a "Vlag en Wimpel" in 1997 for the illustrated book Mon ami Jim.

Further recognition followed in 2003 and 2005, when she received the Silver Pencil for In het pikkedonker (In the pitch dark) and Kleine Dood en het meisje (Little Death and the girl). In 2010 she received the Astrid Lindgren Award, administered by the Swedish Arts Council. In the jury's citation she was described as "the master of line but also of atmosphere".

== Works ==
- 1994: Mon royaume
- 1994: Chat-collection, text by Florence Dutruc-Rosset
- 1995: Un jour mon Prince viendra, text by Andréa Nève
- 1995: Va faire un tour
- 1996: Mon ami Jim: translated in English as Jack and Jim in 2000
- 1997: Copain des peintres: La Boîte à idées des artistes en herbe, text by Geneviève Casterman
- 1997: Lily au royaume des nuages
- 1998: Les animaux et leurs poètes, text by Jean-Hugues Malineau
- 1999: Grote Oma's, text by Bart Moeyaert
- 1999: La Grande Ourse, text by Carl Norac
- 2000: Moi et rien
- 2000: Trois histoires folles de Monsieur Pol
- 2000: 365 histoires, comptines et chansons. Le Grand Livre des petits by Marie Delafon, Kitty Crowther, Rémi Saillard, and Isabelle Chatelard
- 2000: Message de bonheur, pour une naissance
- 2000: 365 histoires pour l'année
- 2000: Lever de rideau, text by Sophie Dieuaide
- 2000: Le scoop du siècle, text by Sophie Dieuaide
- 2000: Ce rat de Custer, text by Sophie Dieuaide
- 2001: Le père Noël m'a écrit, text by Carl Norac
- 2001: Tout va très bien, madame la marquise by Paul Misraki, Henri Allum (aka Henry Laverne), Charles Pasquier, and Kitty Crowther
- 2001: Le Bain d’Elias
- 2001: Champions du monde, la vie héroïque d'Antoine Lebic, text by Sophie Dieuaide
- 2002: De verjaardag van de eekhoorn by Toon Tellegen
- 2002: Scritch scratch dip clapote!
- 2002: Teri hate tua: L'épouvantable tortue rouge!, text by Jean-François Chabas
- 2003: L'Enfant racine
- 2003: La Princesse qui n’existait pas, text by Christian Oster
- 2004: Petits meurtres et autres tendresses
- 2004: 365 histoires, comptines et chansons by Jacques Duquennoy, Rémi Saillard, Isabelle Chatelard, and Kitty Crowther
- 2004: Vingt-neuf moutons, text by Christian Oster
- 2005: La Visite de Petite Mort
- 2005: Le grand désordre
- 2005–2010: Poka et Mine: Le Réveil, Les nouvelle ailes, Au cinéma, Au Musée, Au fond du jardin, Le football
- 2006: Spinoza et Moi, text by Sylvaine Jaoui
- 2006: Copain des peintres, text by Geneviève Casterman
- 2006: Les contes de l'armoire: Trente-cinq contes brefs by Pierre Mosonyi, Kitty Crowther, Eva Almassy, and Fanny Volcsanszky
- 2006: Les contes des magasins by Aliz Mosonyi, Kitty Crowther, and Eva Almassy
- 2006: Pas un mot, text by Nathalie Kuperman

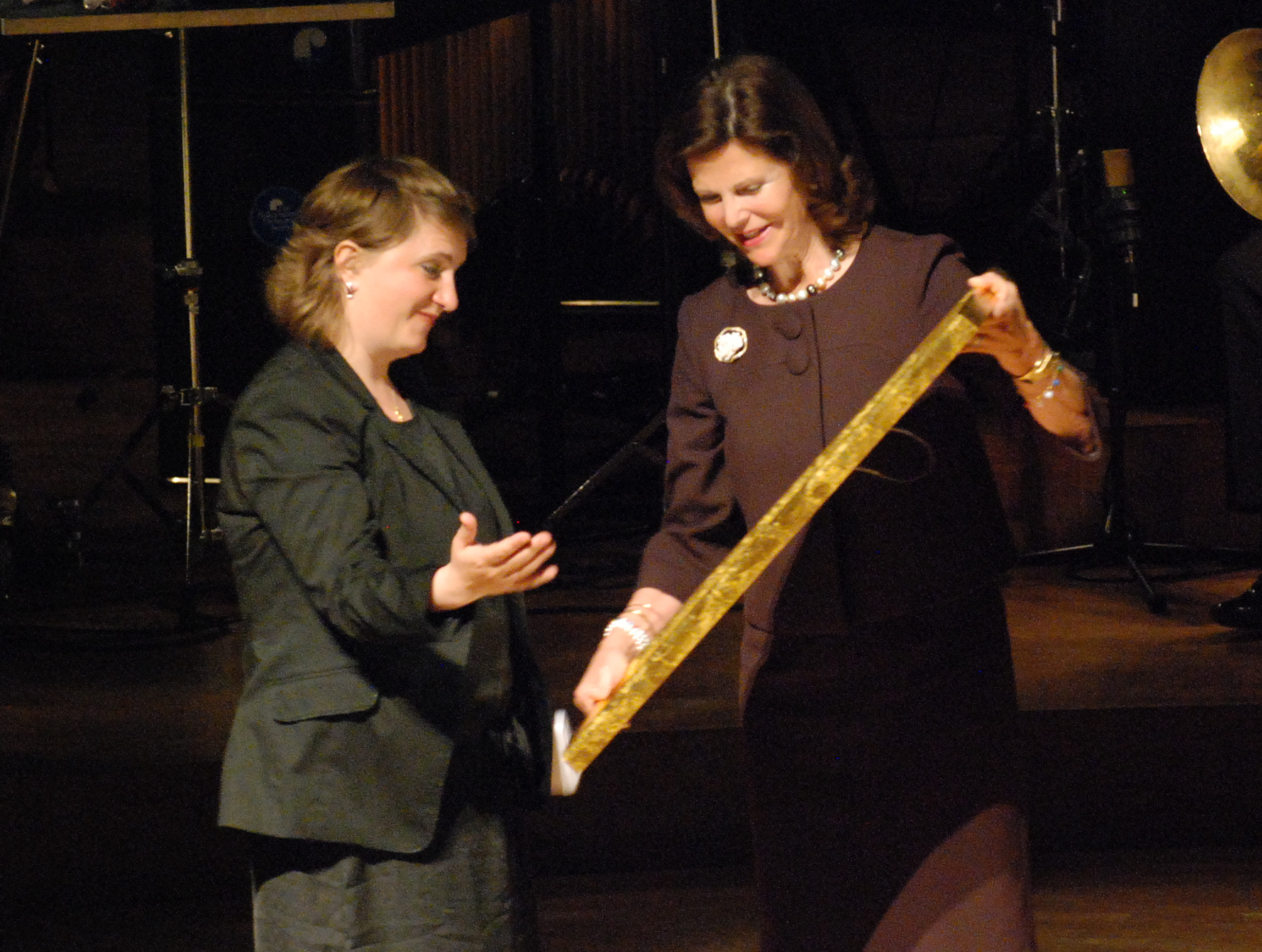
Crowther receives the Lindgren Award from Queen Silvia of Sweden

- 2007: Dans moi, text by Alex Cousseau
- 2007: Un nuage dans le ventre, text by Gilles Abier
- 2008: Alors?
- 2009: Petits poèmes pour passer le temps by Carl Norac, Kitty Crowther, and Célestin
- 2009: Annie du lac
- 2010: "Le petit homme et Dieu"
- 2016: Jan Toorop Het lied van de tijd
- 2018: Stories of the Night, 64pp., ISBN 978-1-776571-97-0 (Gecko Press)
- 2019: The Runaways, text by Ulf Stark 136pp., ISBN 978-1-776572-33-5 (Gecko Press)

== Awards ==
- 2006: Grand Prix triennal de littérature de jeunesse
- 2010: Astrid Lindgren Memorial Award
