= Institut Saint-Luc =

Arts school in Brussels

Coordinates: 50.825°N 4.35°E

The Institut Saint-Luc (French: [ɛ̃s.ti.ty sɛ̃.lyk]) is an arts school in Brussels, Belgium. It consists of six departments, with a total of 2,200 students and 430 employees, spread over five locations in Ixelles and Saint-Gilles.

== History ==
The school was founded by members of the Institute of the Brothers of the Christian Schools, a French order created in 1680 by Jean-Baptiste de la Salle in France. Different Saint-Luc institutes were founded all over Belgium with the first in Ghent in 1863. The first school in Brussels was founded in 1882 in Molenbeek and then was later relocated to Schaerbeek in 1887. Work began in 1904 for a new institute in Saint-Gilles, then called the Institut Jean Béthune, and had only 14 students. Construction finished four years later in 1908. The location is currently still in use and underwent renovations and expansions in 1995.

== Organisation ==
The school (called both Institut and Instituts, depending on the point of view) is divided into six departments:

- ESA, the École Supérieure des Arts (Higher School of Arts), with 700 students: studies include a bachelor's (three years), a master's (one additional year), and a specialized master's (one additional year).
- ERG, the École de Recherche Graphique(School for Graphical Research), with 420 students: studies include a bachelor's (three years), master's (one additional year), and specialized master's (one additional year).
- ISURU, the Institute Supérieure d'Urbanisme et de Rénovation Urbaine (Higher Institute for Urbanism and Urban Renovation), with 85 students: created in 1947, is a post-graduate school with a three-year course (evening studies).
- ISES, The Institut Saint-Luc d'Enseignement Secondaire (Saint-Luc Secondary School), with 610 students.
- EPS, the École de Promotion Sociale (School for Social Promotion), with 340 students.

== The comics division ==
In 1969, comics artist Eddy Paape, who had worked for 20 years for the two leading Franco-Belgian comics magazines Spirou and Tintin, started a course in comics, with the support of Hergé, an alumnus of the Institut. It was the first of its kind in Belgium and was soon developed into a full bachelor's program. Eddy Paape was followed by Claude Renard in 1976. The course soon become a well-known breeding ground for new Belgian talent. From 1975 and on, the program produced the magazine Le 9ème rêve (The 9th Dream, a reference commonly used in Belgium and France describing comics as the ninth art form). In 1978, the magazine received the Award for the best promotion of comics from the French Angoulême International Comics Festival. François Schuiten, an alumni, also taught at the school. Between 1984 and 2006, 286 students received a Bachelor's in Comics. Among the notable outputs of the comics workshop, a group of students co-founded the fanzine and later publishing house La Cinquième Couche in 1993, which became a significant voice in Belgian alternative and conceptual comics.

About 50% of the students later work in the comics industry.

== Notable alumni ==
- Kitty Crowther
- Jean-Michel Folon
- André Franquin
- Hergé
- Philippe Lafontaine
- Xavier Lust
- Midam
- Eddy Paape
- Guy Peellaert
- Picha
- Benoît Poelvoorde
- Stephan Vanfleteren
- Bolis Pupul

=== Alumni from the architecture division ===
- Francis Bonaert
- Pieter Mulier

=== Alumni from the comics division ===
- Andreas
- Jo-El Azara
- Pierre Bailly
- Philippe Berthet
- Frédéric Bézian
- Antonio Cossu
- Denis Deprez
- Chantal de Spiegeleer
- Franz Drappier
- Philippe Francq
- Pascal Garray
- André Geerts
- Alain Goffin
- Bernard Hislaire
- Ilan Manouach
- Jean-David Morvan
- Frank Pé
- Plantu
- François Schuiten
- Benoît Sokal
- Yves Swolfs
