= Allez, Eddy =

- Directed by: Gert Embrechts
- Screenplay by: Gert Embrechts
- Produced by: Jacqueline De Goeij
- Starring: Peter Van Den Begin; Barbara Sarafian; Jelte Blommaert; Mathias Vergels
- Release date: 2012
- Country: Belgium
- Language: Dutch

Allez, Eddy!, translated as "Go, Eddy!", is a Belgian movie and long feature film debut of director Gert Embrechts. The movie was released in 2012.

== Story ==
The story is set in the mid 1970s. Freddy Demul is the youngest son of a butcher family. Freddy likes road bicycle racing, but this is forbidden by his parents Agnes and André due to his fecal incontinence. Agnes is afraid her son will be ridiculed when "the problem" turns up in public, causing such psychological trauma leading Freddy to make some drastic decisions. Agnes knows some children who did self-harm after they were bullied such as the singer with a tumor who never sang anymore and a painter who cut off his tongue as he stuttered. That's why Freddy might not leave the house, although he sneakily goes out sometimes.

A French supermarket "Magique" opens, not far from the butchery. Freddy's brother Briek joins the "Flemish Offensive", some youth organization which protests all French influences. To promote the supermarket, the director organizes a road bicycle racing for children. Freddy subscribes secretly. The winner gets a trip to Roubaix to meet Eddy Merckx. Briek and Agnes think they have seen Freddy in the race. This is confirmed when the director visits the butchery as Freddy won the contest. However, although André is a big fan of Eddy Merckx, he does not allow his son to travel to Roubaix again due to the fecal problem.

André is not impressed with the supermarket. He does not believe in the concept people buy things in a store where meat, clothes and food in cans are sold together. He is wrong and less and less customers visit the butchery. Thanks to his rich sister Marjet he gets an idea: customers can call the butchery for their order. Freddy will deliver the meat with his bicycle. This is however a modest success. Due to too fewer customers and a warm summer the meat gets rotten.

Freddie becomes befriended with Marie, the daughter of the owner of Magique. One day, they decide to go on a bicycle trip. His fecal problem turns up. Whilst riding home, he is stopped by the Flemish Offensive who laugh at him when they see he has soiled his pants. This turns out in a fight between Freddy and Briek on the one hand and the Flemish Offensive on the other hand. Due to the incident, Briek cancels his membership. This is not appreciated by the Flemish Offensive and they throw a brick through the shopwindow. Agnes tells another story with an unhappy end. She had a younger brother who killed himself. He was bullied after he got some severe attacks of epilepsy.

As the butchery is almost broke, André meets the director of Magique. He can convince the director "meat in plastic" is inferior and it is better to open a section with fresh quality meat. André gets a full-time job with guaranteed salary and a commission. Some days later, André closes his own shop.

The director convinces André to subscribe Freddy for a talent scout. After the school vacation a sports school starts a department for talented bicycle racers, sponsored by Eddy Merckx. Freddy gets selected but his candidacy is uncertain due to the fecal incontinence. It would be a scandal for the sponsors and the team when this happens in public. The medical advisor of the jury suggests to perform another medical examination. He finds out there is an obstruction in the large intestine which can be cured. At the end the jury allows Freddy to start the course.

Some years pass and the movie is set to a live submission of Tour of Flanders. When Freddy Demul is shown, the presenter tells Freddy is a talented man who will be known in history books.

== Awards ==
The movie won 2 awards during the fifth edition of Skykid.com Coming-of-Age Movie Awards. Actor Jelle Blommaert won in category Best Newcomer. The movie itself won the Prize in category Best International Film.

== Cast ==
- Peter Van Den Begin - André
- Barbara Sarafian - Agnes
- Jelte Blommaert - Freddy
- Mathias Vergels - Briek
- Els Dottermans - Marjet
- Lotte Bode - Fien
- Silke Cnockaert - Marleen
- Bruno Georis - Jacques Gentils
- Coline Leempoel - Marie
- Frieda Pittoors - Cecil
- Bruno Vereeck - Amand
- Stefaan Degand - Jules
- Jelle Cleymans - Joris
- Julian Borsani - Wim
- Ben Van den Heuvel - Jozef
- Jelle Florizoone - Albrecht
- Jo Decaluwe - Mayor
