= Noa Lee =

Belgian art pop band

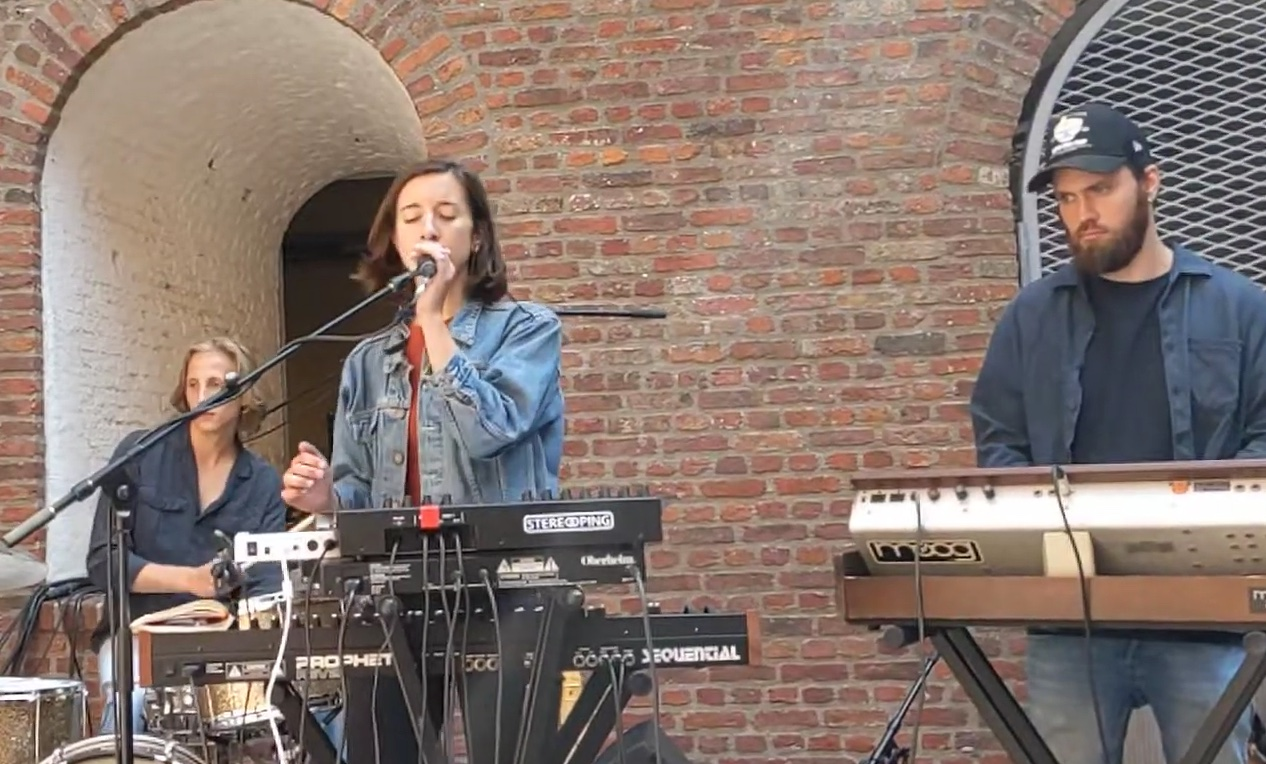
- Noa Lee (Broeckx, Kortekaas, Van Overschee) performing in Ostend

Background information
- Origin: Brussels, Belgium
- Genres: indie pop; art rock; jazz
- Years active: 2018–present
- Label: Polymoon
- Members: Nina Kortekaas; Robbe Broeckx; Boris Van Overschee; Sebastian Leye
- Past members: Lennart Heyndels

Noa Lee is a Belgian band led by Nina Marie Kortekaas (2 October 1995), formed in 2018 in Brussels. The group perform English-language indie pop with influences from genres such as jazz and progressive rock. During their formative years, they performed in support of Arsenal and School is Cool. Their self-titled debut EP was released in 2021, accompanied by a short film directed by Kortekaas. In 2022, they performed at the Theater Aan Zee festival in Ostend.

The band released "After Years", the first single from their debut album Airship, in 2023. They worked on the album during a residency at the De Grote Post arts centre in Ostend.

Kortekaas is also known as a member of the successful Belgian bands Portland and The Radar Station. She has additionally performed with acts such as Eefje de Visser en Admiral Freebee. As an actor, she has had roles in Professor T., Aspe and North Sea Texas.

== Band members ==
Members

- Nina Kortekaas – vocals, keys, occasional guitar
- Robbe Broeckx – drums, backing vocals
- Boris Van Overschee – bass guitar, keys
- Sebastian Leye – guitar

Former members

- Lennart Heyndels – guitar

== Discography ==
=== Albums ===
- Airship (2023)

=== EPs ===
- Noa Lee (2021)

=== Singles ===
- "Blue Ruin" (2018)
- "Move Backwards" (2019)
- "Surrender" (2019)
- "Dance" (2020)
- "Your Song" (2020)
- "After Years" (2023)
- "Bleed" (2023)
- "Elephant" (2023)
