= Hello, Sailor (book) =

2000 children's book with LGBT theme

Hello, Sailor (ISBN 0-333-99290-3) is a children's book by Ingrid Godon and André Sollie (illustrated by Godon). It was first published in the Netherlands in 2000, and in 2003 in the United Kingdom by Macmillan Books. It was one of the books cited in newspaper articles as being "forced upon schools" in the controversy in England in the implementation of the Equality Act in 2006. The Christian Institute argues that this legislation effectively forces schools to include books with homosexual characters in school curricula, although government officials and gay rights advocates argue that no coercion exists.

This children's book centres on a lighthouse keeper called Matt and his friend, Sailor, whom he deeply misses. Whilst Sailor is at sea, Matt plans to sail round the world with him if and when he finally returns, which Matt, convinced by his friends Felix and Rose, thinks is doubtful. However, Matt and Sailor eventually are reunited, and sail off together.

This book is perceived to be a thinly veiled story of male homosexuality.

A review of Hello, Sailor featured in the British lesbian magazine Diva. The Independent described Hello, Sailor as "A charming and heartwarming tale", whilst The Observer remarked that it is "A beautiful book...it makes – just as it should – the love between two men as natural and deep as any other."
