= Jelle Florizoone =

Belgian actor

- Born: 22 September 1995 (age 30); Ostend, West Flanders, Belgium
- Years active: 2010–present
- Partner: Amir Famhy (2016–present)
- Website: jelleflorizoone.com

Jelle Florizoone (born 22 September 1995) is a Belgian actor and dancer. He is best known for his roles as Pim in the film North Sea Texas (2011) and Rick in the children's series ROX (2011–2015).

== Early life and education ==
Florizoone was born in the coastal town of Ostend. He became a fan of all things performing arts at a young age, and his mother enrolled him in local ballet classes. It was then suggested he audition for the Royal Ballet School of Antwerp, where he would attend as a boarding student. He went on to study Musical Theatre at the Royal Conservatory of Brussels, but withdrew two years into the course to make time for ROX.

== Career ==
In 2011, Florizoone starred as the main character of Pim in the Flemish drama film North Sea Texas. The film follows the story of Pim, a boy living with his reckless mother, who falls in love with his male best friend, Gino. Later, he starred in the children's superhero drama ROX (2011–2015), which revolves around three young heroes with exceptional talents and an exceptional car called ROX.

Florizoone has also appeared in the TV show Mega Mindy, and in the movies Allez, Eddy and Marina. In September 2015 he was first seen as Guido Van Den Bossche, a main role in VTM's soap opera Familie, being the fourth actor in a row performing this character. After some months he decided to quit the soap after the season's finale in June 2016. He was succeeded by Vincent Banic.

== Personal life ==
He is openly gay. He has worked part-time as a flight attendant.

== Filmography ==
=== Film ===
Year	Title	Role	Notes
2011	North Sea Texas	Pim	
2012	Allez, Eddy	Albrecht	
2012	Corps perdu	Miller	Short film
2013	Marina	Ward	
2014	Kleine verhalen in een groote oorlog	Isidore Paukens	Short film
2014	Stoorzender	Jonah	Short film
2015	Mega Mindy Vs. Rox	Rick	
2016	Written Images	Steven	
2017	Koudwatervrees	Lander	Short film
TBA	Kartonnen Dozen	TBA	Upcoming film

=== Television ===
Year	Title	Role	Notes
2010	Mega Mindy	Alien	Season 5, episode 3: "Bezoek uit de cosmos"
2011–2015	ROX	Rick	Main role (57 episodes)
2013	Aspe	Michiel Demedts	Season 9, episode 7: "Au pair"
2015–2016	Familie	Guido van den Bossche	Main role
2015	Een Nieuw Leven	Guido Van den Bossche	Miniseries (17 episodes)
2015	Rox: Falen is geen optie	Rick	Miniseries (5 episodes)
2018	Kosmoo	Tijs	Season 3, episode 5: "Revolution War"
2019	Find Me in Paris	Owen	Season 2 (3 episodes)
2019	Thuis	Daan de Loore	Season 24–25 (12 episodes)
2022	De Kotmadam	Pieter-Jan	Season 24, episode 1: "Jeugdvlam"
2024	Onder Vuur	Lastige gast 2	Season 3, episode 8: "Afscheid"

== Stage ==
Year	Title	Role	Notes
2011–2015	De Grote Sinterklaasshow	Rick	Sportpaleis, Antwerp (annual holiday show)
2015	Superhero Days	Rick	
2015	The Hired Man	Ensemble	
