= Xavier Lust =

Belgian furniture designer and sculptor

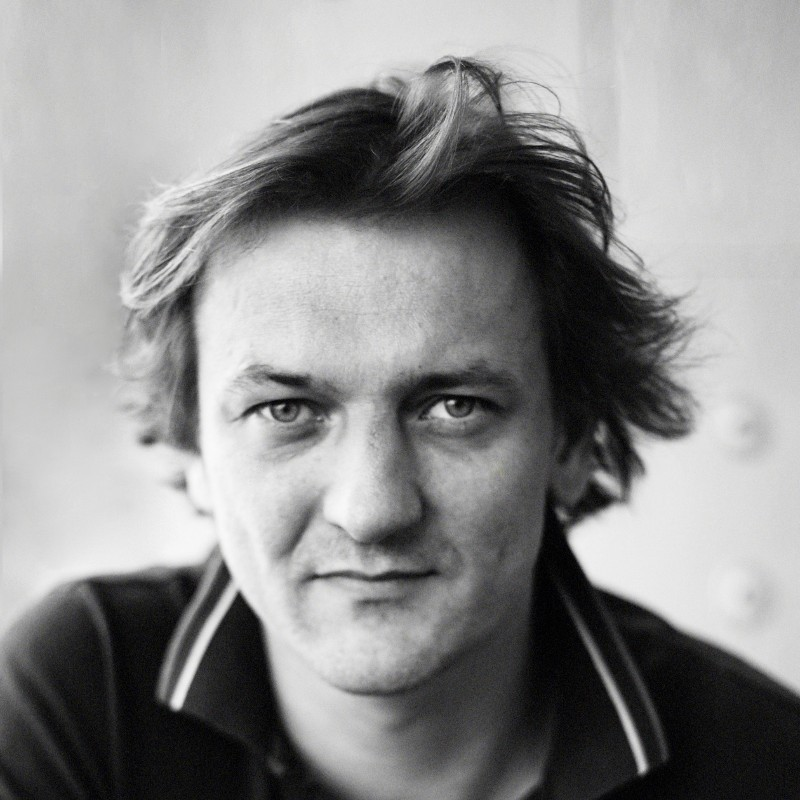
- Born: August 27, 1969 (age 56); Bruges, Belgium
- Website: xavierlust.com

Xavier Lust is a Belgian furniture designer and sculptor based in Brussels. He is best known for the unique technique of shaping metal that he uses to make furniture. The simple and original shapes created by folding and curving metal sheets without a mould have become his work signature. He has collaborated with several furniture manufacturers including MDF Italia, Driade, De Padova, CerrutiBaleri, Kristalia, Fiam and Extremis.

He is the founder and principal of Xavier Lust design studio.

== Early life and education ==
Lust was born on August 27, 1969, in Bruges and grew up in the Brussels Region. He studied interior design at Saint-Luc Institute, where he graduated in 1992.

== Career ==
After graduating, Lust opened his own studio in Brussels. Over the next eight years, he also kept an atelier where he worked with steel, stainless steel and aluminum. He spent much of the decade developing his own range of furniture designs in his workshop, while also undertaking projects for shops, offices, bars, restaurants and private interiors. In 2000, he introduced his work at the Salone Satellite at Milan's furniture fair and his long lasting collaboration with MDF Italia started with Le Banc - a bench.

Other famous works by Lust include La Grande Table, Crédence, Turner candlesticks and S-Table. He has designed furniture for several Italian brands, taking advantage of each collaboration to explore new visions and technical opportunities and to create innovative elements. He has also turned his attentions to the world of textiles, designing the patterns of luxury carpets.

Since 2000, Lust has been showing new art every at the Salonedel Mobile in Milan. Two collaboration with De Padova and Extremis started in 2002 and another one started with Driade in 2004, for furniture and tableware objects. A significant retrospective of his work was held at the Muséedes Arts Contemporains in Hornu, Belgium in 2007. His pieces are part of the permanent collection of museums including Stedelijk Museum in Amsterdam and Musée des Arts Décoratifs in Paris. Lust collaborated with Fiam Italia in 2008 on Graph desk, and with MGX by Materialis in 2009 on Gamete Lamp.

In 2010, Lust won a design competition for the bus shelters of the Brussels Intercommunal Transport Company that will be implemented widely in 2015. In 2011, Lust designed the awarding statuette for Magritte Awards drawing inspiration from a poster by René Magritte for a film festival in 1958. In 2014, in collaboration with Pianca, he designed Confluence, a table with a wooden surface on a steel structure. The design of the table received several awards including Compasso d'Oro. Later that year, Kristalia released OXO collection of stackable chairs and barstools in collaboration with Lust at the Biennale Interieur 2014. The collection included the oXo Chair and Stool.

In September 2014 Lust had an exhibition ‘Mobilier’ of 20 new art-design pieces at Galerie du Passage owned by Pierre Passebon in Paris. Some of the pieces presented were also displayed at PAD London and in Design Miami.

Lust is a regular lecturer at art and design institutions and industry conferences around the world. He was a speaker at the Business of Design Week in Hong Kong in 2013, at Casa Cor Stars in São Paulo in 2012 and at Art & design sessions at BMW Brand store in Brussels in 2015.

== Critical reception ==
Lust's work has been featured several times in national and international magazines. His metal moulding technique has been praised widely. Design Boom wrote that "Xavier Lust is clearly identifiable through the visible tension he gives to his objects, and the curves influenced by his innovative (de)formation process of metallic surfaces." "A wonderful aspect of Xavier's work is the illusion of lightness and motion," writes the Russian critic Olga Bozhko. "In his designs he manages to express what seems impossible. It's seems as though his works are not created; they are born."

Lust's artwork has also been featured in multiple magazines with positive reviews. Writing about the oXo collection, Design Chronicle wrote that "the minimalist and sleek design makes the collection ideal for commercial and residential settings" and Retail Design Blog wrote about the Confluence table that "the attraction for metal elements that has always affected Lust is combined here with Pianca’s experience with wooden materials, emerging into an organic and dynamic composition."

== Awards and honors ==
- Confluence awarded Muuuz International Awards - 2014
- Sumo awarded Premio Dino Gavina - Sept 2009
- Flow awarded Henry van de Velde Label - 2008
- S-table awarded "Schoener-Wohnen-Neue-Klassiker" - 2008
- Elle Decoration International Design Award for S-table - 2008
- Special Mention for La Grande Table at the XXthCompassoD'oro Awards - 2004
- PicNik awarded the Good Design award by The Chicago Athenaeum (Museum of Architecture and Design) - 2004
- Crédence selected by the Osservatorio Permanente Per Il Design for the XXthCompassoD'oro Awards - 2004
- PicNik won the iF Award - 2004
- Henry van de Velde Award for Young Talent - 2003
- La Grande Table selected by the Osservatorio Permanente Per Il Design for the XX CompassoD'oro Awards - 2003
- PicNik awarded First Prize in the Best Item category Interior Innovation Award 2003 at the InternationaleMöbelmesse - 2003
- Le Banc wins the best furniture design award at the 13th Design week Awards - 2002
- Le Banc wins first prize in the seating category and all around favorite prize from Le Vif - l'Express - 2002

== Museum Acquisitions ==
- 2015 - Baobab - The Liliane and David M. Stewart Program for Modern Design at Musée des Beaux Arts de Montréal
- 2012 - Turner - Indianapolis Museum of Art from The Liliane and David M. Stewart Program
- 2006 - Crédence - Musée Des Arts Décoratifs, Contemporary design museum collection.
- 2006 - Crédence and Le Banc - Stedelijk Museum
- 2006 - PicNik - Tate Modern
- 2005 - Le Banc - Muséed'ArtJaponais
- 2001 - 2004 - T-chair - San Francisco Museum of Modern Art

== Bibliography ==
- Xavier Lust: Design Stories, Ed. Stichting Kunstboek BVBA, 2016 (ISBN 978-9058565365)
- Xavier Lust (de)formations : Edition bilingue anglais-italien, Ed. Stichting Kunstboek BVBA, 2007 (ISBN 978-9058562111)
