= ROX (Belgian TV series) =

- Failure is not an option.
- Country of origin: Belgium
- Original language: Dutch
- No. of seasons: 5
- No. of episodes: 57

Production
- Running time: 25 minutes
- Production company: Studio 100

Original release
- Network: Ketnet (2011 - 2012); Z@ppelin (2012 - 2015)
- Release: 5 December 2011 – 26 December 2015

ROX is a Flemish children's superhero drama, produced by Studio 100. The show revolves around three young heroes with an exceptional talent and an exceptional car, ROX. The abbreviation ROX stands for Riding on OXygen but also for the names of the three heroes (Rick, Olivia and Xavier). On Dec 9 2015 ROX made its cinema debut in the crossover film "Mega Mindy versus ROX.

== Concept ==
Three extraordinary, talented young heroes were selected by the government and brought together in an ultra-secret team. Their mission is to succeed where everyone fails. Their weapon: ROX.

== Cast ==
- Rick: Jelle Florizoone (2011–2015)
- Olivia: Jana Geurts (2011–2015)
- Xavier: Jeremy Vandoorne (2011–2015)
- ROX: Chris Van den Durpel (voice) (2011–2015)
- Colonel: Frans Maas (2011–2015)
- Jozefien: Magda Cnudde (2012–2015)
