= Francis Bonaert =

Belgian architect

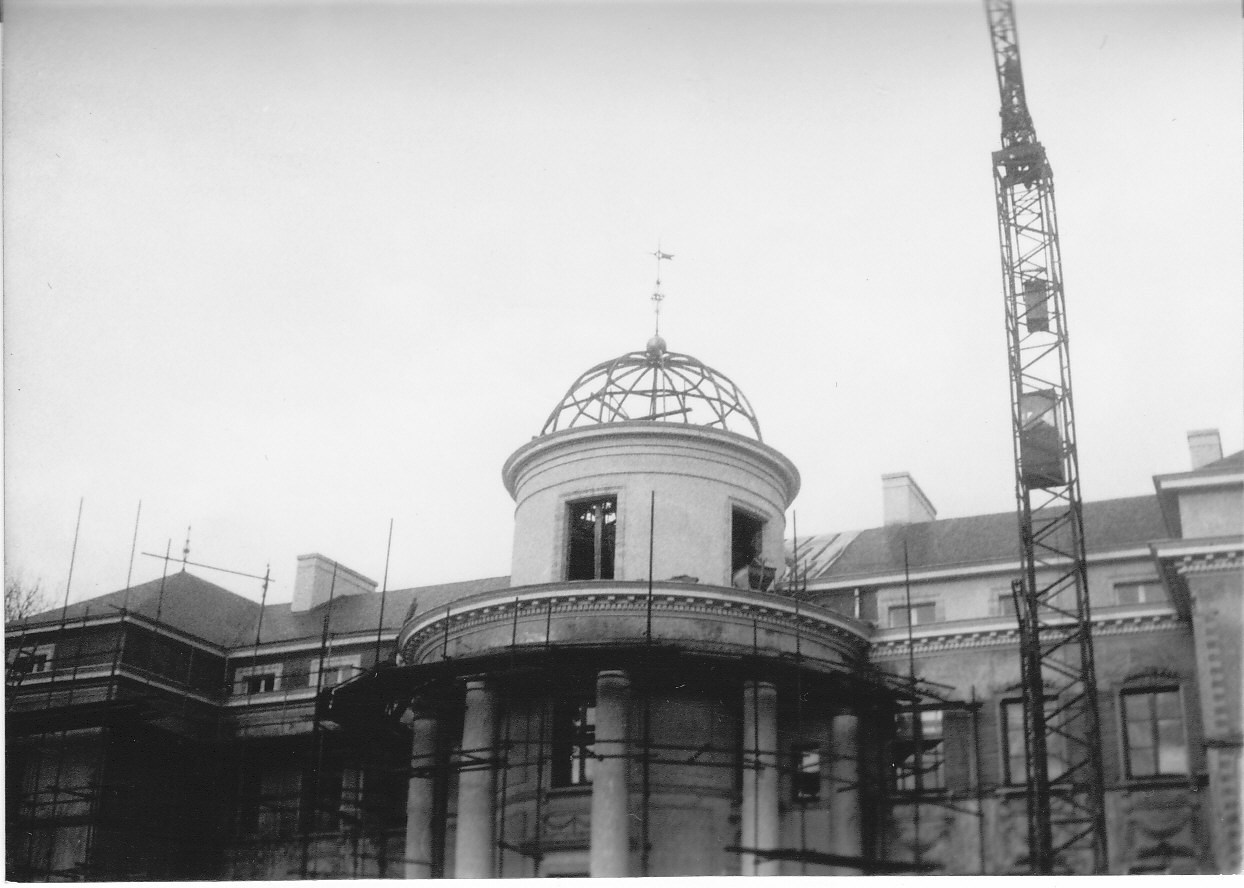
Restoration work of the dome at Duras Castle, 1961

Baron Francis Bonaert (7 September 1914 – 15 June 2012) was a Belgian architect.

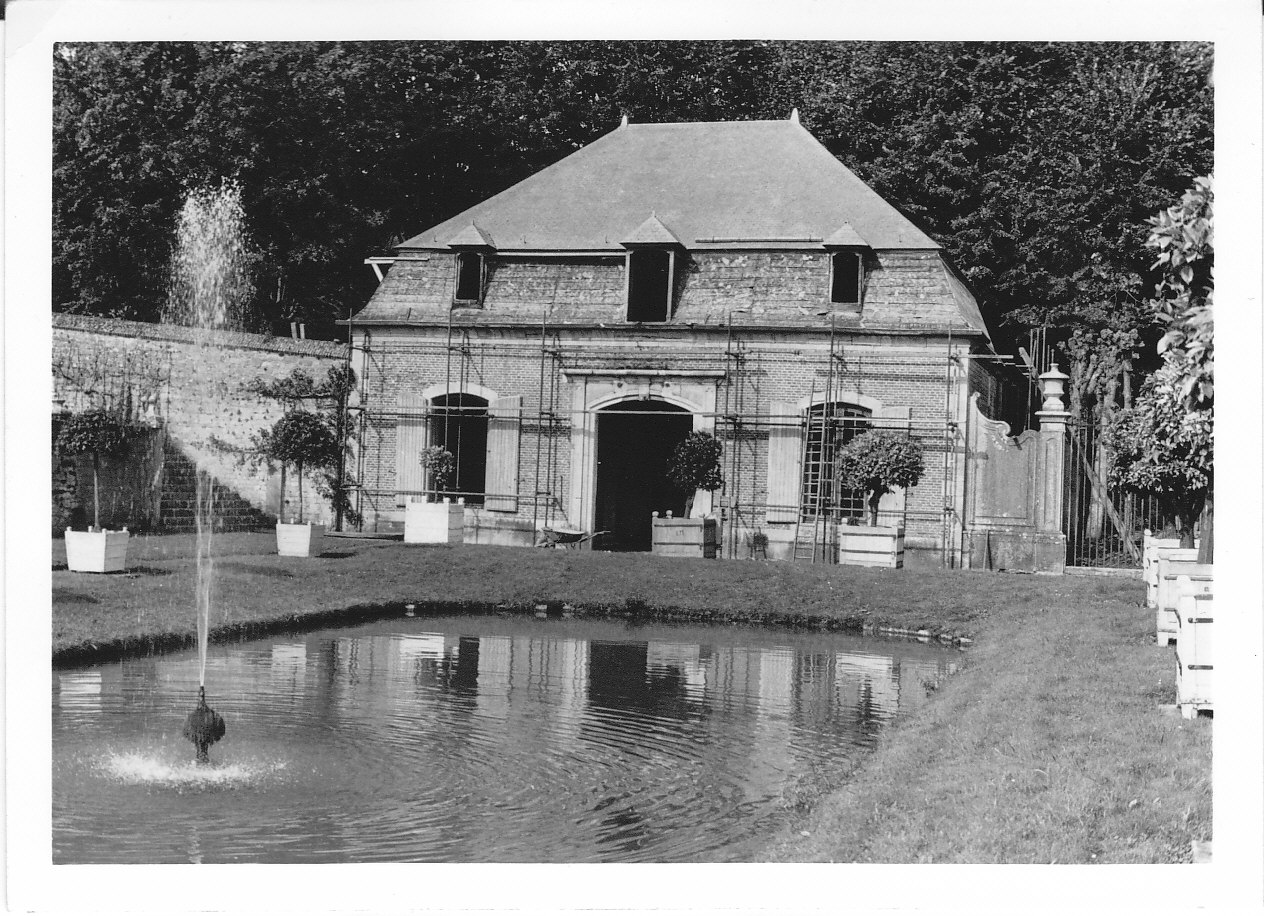
Restoration work on the orangeries at Freÿr Castle, 1970

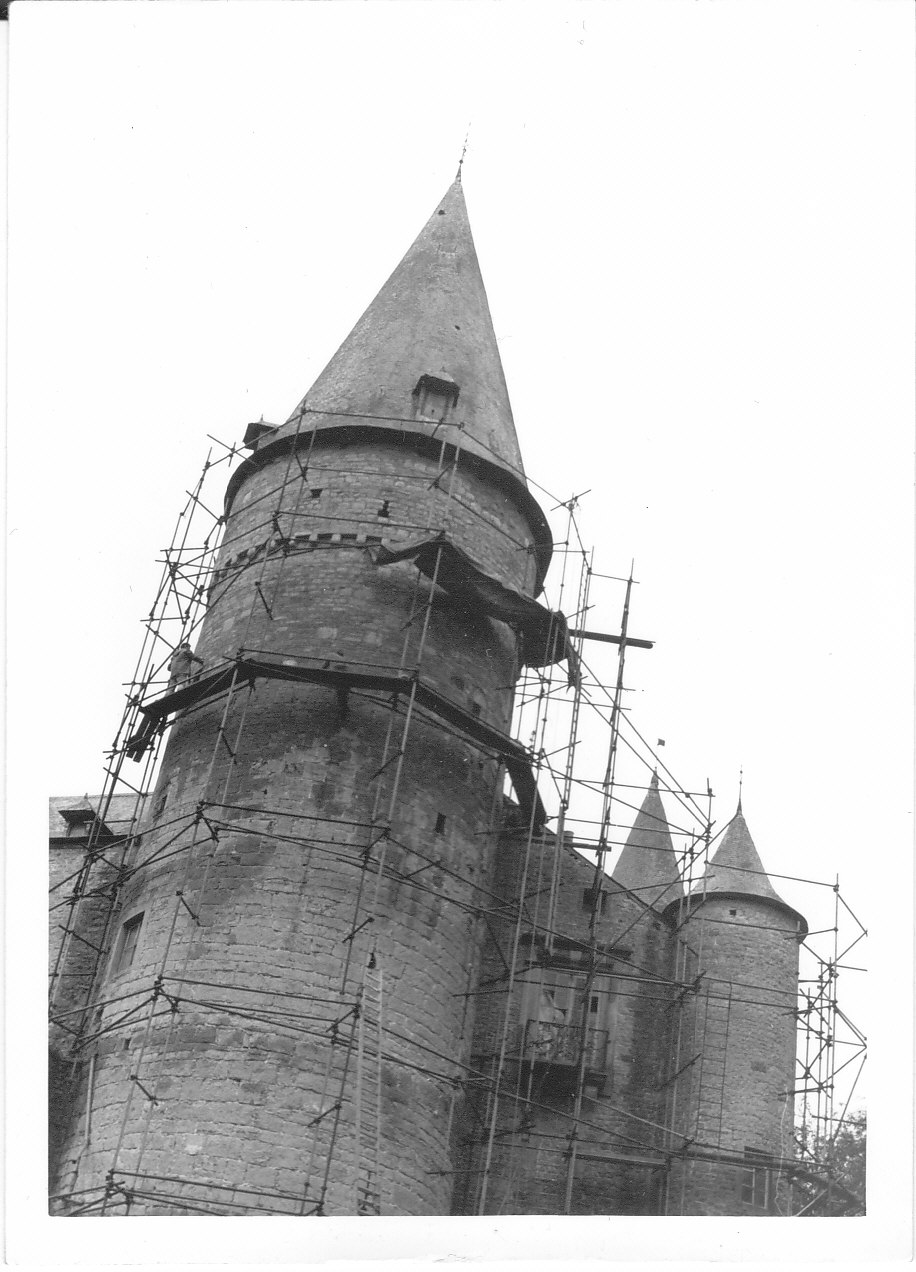
Restoration work on the keep at Vêves Castle, 1969

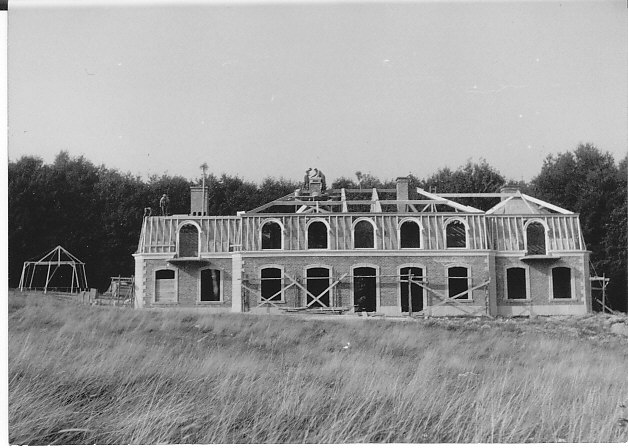
Villa in classical style, 1961

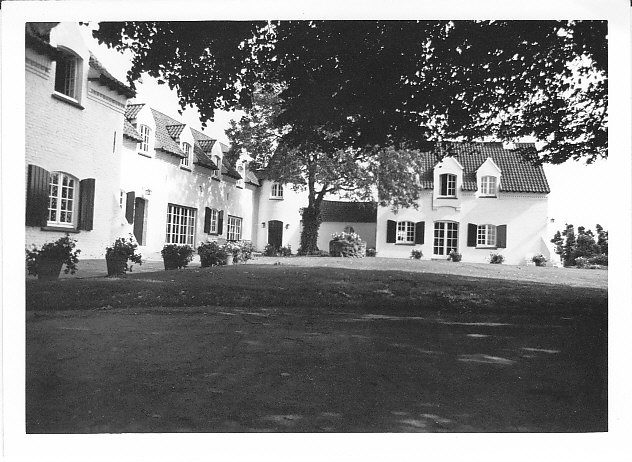
Villa in Flemish Style, 1974

== Biography ==
Francis Bonaert was born in Kortrijk, Belgium, and died in Brussels. Initially, he pursued classical studies in Latin and Greek at Maredsous Abbey, until 1933. While at Maredsous, he started taking photographs under the guidance of Father Attout OSB using a Leica (Leitz). An interest in shape and form led him to study architecture at the Institut Saint-Luc, in Brussels, from which he graduated in 1940.

In 1941, he studied modern architecture under the architect Stanislas Jasinski. He developed plans for a museum where light comes gradually from above as one moves upwards in the building. The plans were not executed, but used the same ideas as those that gave birth to the Guggenheim Museum in New York City.

During World War II, he returned to work as a photographer to avoid working as an architect for the Germans. During this period he was influenced by Edmond Moulu, who was making photos of Orval Abbey on new Gevalux paper, and applied this technique to two types of subject: portrait and scenery. He also worked in 1942–43 under the supervision of the architect Oscar Goffart, where he was trained in attention to detail in design.

After the war, he opened his own office in Brussels.

== Work ==
Bonaert worked in four main areas:

- He built a few modern buildings as exemplified by the Benelux pavilion at Expo '58, in Brussels.
- Under the influence of a titled book Early Homes depicting colonial houses in the United States, he started building private villas.
- Later, he moved to building villas of more classical inspiration and in the Flemish farm style.
- Finally, he restored many protected monuments, especially castles and some churches. In this area his most impressive work was the restoration of Duras Castle, Vêves Castle, Castle of Freÿr.
