= André Sollie =

Belgian author and illustrator (1947–2025)

- Born: 7 July 1947 Mechelen, Antwerp, Belgium
- Died: 13 January 2025 (aged 77)
- Occupation: Writer, illustrator
- Notable awards: Boekenpauw 1998 De brief die Rosie vond 2010 De Zomerzot; Gouden Griffel 2001 Wachten op Matroos

André Sollie (7 July 1947 – 13 January 2025) was a Belgian author and illustrator of children's literature.

== Life and career ==
Sollie made his debut in children's poetry with Soms, dan heb ik flink de pest in in 1986.

In 2000, Sollie and Ingrid Godon published the children's book Wachten op Matroos. They both won the Gouden Griffel award a year later for this book. The English translation of the book Hello, Sailor was published in 2003. The book is about a lighthouse keeper called Matt and his friend, Sailor, whom he deeply misses. The book caused controversy in England as it was argued that its inclusion in school curricula effectively forced schools to include books with homosexual characters.

In 2004, he published Dubbel Doortje which was the first book that he both wrote and illustrated himself. He won the Boekenpluim award for his illustrations in this book.

His 2005 novel for adolescents Nooit gaat dit over was turned into the 2011 feature film North Sea Texas (Noordzee, Texas) by Bavo Defurne.

Sollie won the Boekenpauw award twice for his illustrations: in 1998 for the book De brief die Rosie vond written by Bart Moeyaert and in 2010 for the book De Zomerzot which he wrote himself.

== Death ==
Sollie died on 13 January 2025, at the age of 77.

== Awards ==
- 1982: Prijs van de Kinder- en Jeugdjury voor het boek in Vlaanderen, De bloeiende mimosaboom
- 1986: Prijs van de Kinder- en Jeugdjury voor het boek in Vlaanderen, De witte vogel
- 1991: Prijs van de Kinder- en Jeugdjury voor het boek in Vlaanderen, 35 boeven in Moo
- 1993: Prijs van de Kinder- en Jeugdjury voor het boek in Vlaanderen, Hotel Hoteldebotel
- 1998: Boekenpauw, De brief die Rosie vond (written by Bart Moeyaert)
- 1998: Boekenwelp, Het ijzelt in juni
- 2001: Gouden Griffel, Wachten op Matroos (with Ingrid Godon)
- 2005: Boekenpluim, Dubbel Doortje
- 2007: Prijs van de Vlaamse Gemeenschap voor Jeugdliteratuur, Een raadsel voor Roosje
- 2010: Boekenpauw, De Zomerzot
