= Toon Tellegen =

Dutch writer, poet, and physician

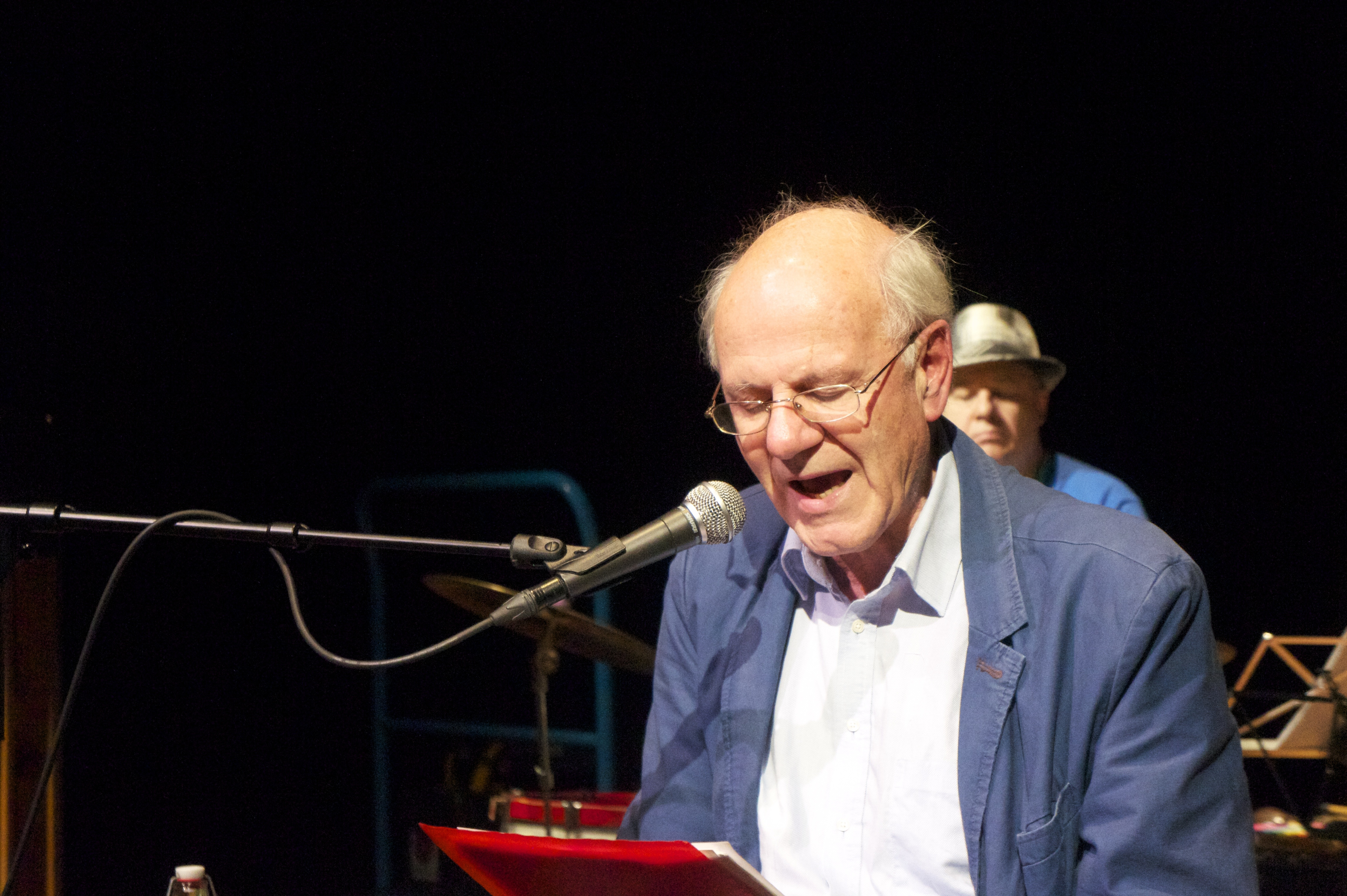
- Born: Antonius Otto Hermannus Tellegen
- Occupations: Poet, writer

Antonius Otto Hermannus (Toon) Tellegen (born 18 November 1941) is a Dutch writer, poet, and physician, known for children's books, especially those featuring anthropomorphised animals, particularly those about an ant and a squirrel. His writings are also enjoyed by adults, due to the amusing, bizarre situations that Tellegen creates, as well as their dealings with philosophical subjects.

For his lasting contribution as a children's writer, Tellegen was a finalist for the biennial, international Hans Christian Andersen Award in 2006.

== Biography ==
Tellegen was born in Brielle. He studied medicine at the University of Utrecht, and worked as a general practitioner in Amsterdam. After writing for many years mainly for adults, Tellegen switched to children's stories. His first children's book, written in 1984, was Er ging geen dag voorbij: negenenveertig verhalen over de eekhoorn en de andere dieren (English: Not A Day Went By: forty-nine tales of the squirrel and other animals). In these stories, the ant and the squirrel often play the lead role, and many of his stories touch on philosophical concepts.

Tellegen still writes today.

== Prizes ==
- 1969 - ANV-Visser Neerlandia-prijs for Als moeder ergens ziek van wordt (When Mother Gets Sick of Something)
- 1988 - Gouden Griffel for Toen niemand iets te doen had (When nobody had anything to do)
- 1990 - Zilveren Griffel for Langzaam, zo snel zij konden (Slowly, as fast as they could)
- 1992 - Woutertje Pieterse Prijs for Juffrouw Kachel (Ms. Heater)
- 1993 - Jan Campertprijs for Een dansschool (A Dance School)
- 1994 - Woutertje Pieterse Prijs for Bijna iedereen kon omvallen (Almost Everyone Could Fall Over)
- 1994 - Gouden Griffel for Bijna iedereen kon omvallen (Almost Everyone Could Fall Over)
- 1994 - Zilveren Griffel for Jannes
- 1997 - Theo Thijssen-prijs for his complete works
- 1997 - Zilveren Griffel for Teunis
- 1999 - Zilveren Griffel for De verjaardag van alle anderen (Everyone Else's Birthday)
- 2000 - Gouden Uil for De Genezing van de Krekel (The Healing of the Cricket)
- 2006 - Finalist, Hans Christian Andersen Award for Writers
- 2007 - Constantijn Huygensprijs for his complete works
- 2011 - Popescu Prize for Raptors

== Publications ==
=== Children's books ===
- 1984 - Er ging geen dag voorbij. Negenenveertig verhalen over de eekhoorn en de andere dieren (Not A Day Goes By: forty-nine tales of the squirrel and other animals)'
- 1985 – "Ik ga op reis" zei de eekhoorn ("I'm Going on a Trip" said the squirrel). Uitgave Amstelveen, Zondagsdrukkers; op 45 exx.
- 1987 – Toen niemand iets te doen had (When nobody had any anything to do)
- 1990 – Het feest op de maan (The Party on the Moon)
- 1991 – Misschien waren zij nergens (Maybe they were nowhere)
- 1991 – Juffrouw Kachel (Ms. Heater)
- 1993 – Bijna iedereen kon omvallen (Almost Everyone Could Fall Over)
- 1993 – Jannes
- 1994 – Mijn vader (My Dad)
- 1995 – De verjaardag van de eekhoorn (The Squirrel's Birthday)
- 1995 – Misschien wisten zij alles. 214 verhalen over de eekhoorn en de andere dieren (Maybe they knew everything: 214 tales of the squirrel and other animals) (includes a CD where Tellegen reads a number of stories)
- 1996 – Brieven aan niemand anders (Letters to No-one Else)
- 1996 – De ontdekking van de honing (The Honey Discovery)
- 1996 – De verschrompeling van de olifant (The Shrinking of the Elephant)
- 1996 – Teunis (Evening)
- 1997 – Dokter Deter (Doctor Soap)
- 1998 – Mijn avonturen door V. Swchwrm (My Adventures Through V. Swchwrm) (first published as kinderboekenweekgeschenk)
- 1998 – De verjaardag van alle anderen (Everyone Elses Birthday)
- 1999 – De genezing van de krekel (The Healing of the Cricket)
- 2000 – Ze sliepen nog (They're Still Sleeping)
- 2001 – Taartenboek (Cakebook)
- 2002 – Is er dan niemand boos? (Is Nobody Mad?)
- 2004 – Plotseling ging de olifant aan (Suddenly The Elephant Turned On)
- 2006 – De eenzaamheid van de egel (The Loneliness of the Hedgehog)
- 2007 – Post voor iedereen (Mail for Everyone) (illustrations by Mance Post)
- 2007 – Dierenverhalen van Toon Tellegen & het wisselend toonkwintet (Animal Tales by Toon Tellegen & the Variable Tone Quintet) (Audio CD)
- 2007 – Ik zal je nooit vergeten (I'll Never Forget You)
- 2008 – Morgen was het feest (Tomorrow Was the Festival). With illustrations by Ingrid Godon.
- 2009 – Het vertrek van de mier (The Ant's Departure)
- 2009 – Iedereen was er (Everyone Was There)
- 2009 - Maar niet uit het hart. Dierenverhalen over afscheid. (But Not From The Heart: Animal Tales about Farewells)
- 2009 - Met hart en ziel. Dierenverhalen voor elk feest. (With Heart and Soul: Animal Stories for Every Festival)
- 2009 - Een hart onder de riem. Dierenverhalen vol troost. (Heartening Animal Stories)
- 2009 - Na aan het hart. Dierenverhalen vol vriendschap. (Close to the Heart: Animal Stories Full of Friendship)
- 2009 - Beterschap. Dierenverhalen over ziekte en gezondheid. (Get well: Animal Stories of Sickness and Health)
- 2009 - Welterusten. Dierenverhalen over slaap en sluimer. (Good night: Animal Stories of Sleep and Slumber)
- 2009 - Goede reis. Dierenverhalen over vertrek en aankomst. (Safe Journey: Animal Stories of Departure and Arrival)
- 2009 - Houd moed. Dierenverhalen over verdriet en eenzaamheid. (Keep Courage: Animal Stories of Sorrow and Loneliness)

Boxer Books collections

Boxer Books Ltd of London has published in Britain, and distributed in America, several collections of Tellegen's animal stories illustrated by Jessica Ahlberg and translated by Martin Cleaver. For the first, Cleaver won the biennial Marsh Award for Children's Literature in Translation in 2011.

- Letters to Anyone and Everyone (2009) – Marsh Award, OCLC 630882791
- The Squirrel's Birthday and Other Parties (2009), OCLC 311760759
- Far Away Across the Sea (2010), OCLC 436617977
- A Great and Complicated Adventure (2013), OCLC 827974470

Books in English

- 2014 – The Day No One Was Angry (Gecko Press), ISBN 978-1-927271-57-5
- 2021 – No One Is Angry Today (Gecko Press), ISBN 978-1-776573-45-5

=== Other prose ===
- 1989 – Langzaam, zo snel als zij konden (Slowly, as Fast as They Could)
- 1994 – Twee oude vrouwtjes (Two Old Ladies) (illustrations by André Sollie)
- 1998 – Dora. Een liefdesgeschiedenis. (Dora: A Love Story)
- 2000 – De trein naar Pavlovsk en Oostvoorne (The Train To Pavlovsk and Oostvoorne)
- 2000 – Enkele onwaarschijnlijke aantekeningen van Dante Alighieri bij het schrijven van zijn goddelijke komedie (Some unlikely notes of Dante Alighieri while writing his Divine Comedy)
- 2002 – Brieven aan Doornroosje (Letters to Sleeping Beauty)
- 2008 – Een nieuwe tijd (A New Age) – Grafisch Nederland 2008, novelette
- 2014 – Het verlangen van de egel (The Desire of the Hedgehog)

=== Poetry ===
- 1980 – De zin van een liguster
- 1981 – De aanzet tot een web
- 1982 – Beroemde scherven
- 1984 – De andere ridders
- 1985 – Ik en ik
- 1987 – Mijn winter
- 1989 – In N. en andere gedichten
- 1991 – Een langzame val
- 1992 – Een dansschool
- 1994 – Tijger onder de slakken
- 1998 – Gewone gedichten
- 1996 – Als we vlammen waren
- 1997 – Over liefde en over niets anders
- 1999 – Er ligt een appel op een schaal. Anthology
- 2000 – Gedichten 1977-1999. Collected poems.
- 2000 – Kruis en munt
- 2001 – De een en de ander
- 2001 – Een man en een engel. Uitg. Landgraaf, Herik; circulation of 399 copies.
- 2002 – Alleen liefde
- 2002 – Wie A zegt. Gedichten
- 2004 – Minuscule oorlogen (niet met het blote oog zichtbaar)
- 2004 – Daar zijn woorden voor. Anthology. Edition by Rainbow pockets.
- 2005 – ...m n o p q...
- 2006 – Raafvogels; English: Raptors (Manchester: Carcanet Press, 2011)
- 2008 – Hemels en vergeefs

=== Drama ===
- 1966 – Jimmy Walker. Debut.
- 1980 – Wespen
- 2007 – Leven met een onbekende.
- 2009 - Twee oude vrouwtjes.
