= Caractères =

- Category: Sans-serif
- Classification: Grotesque
- Date created: 1837

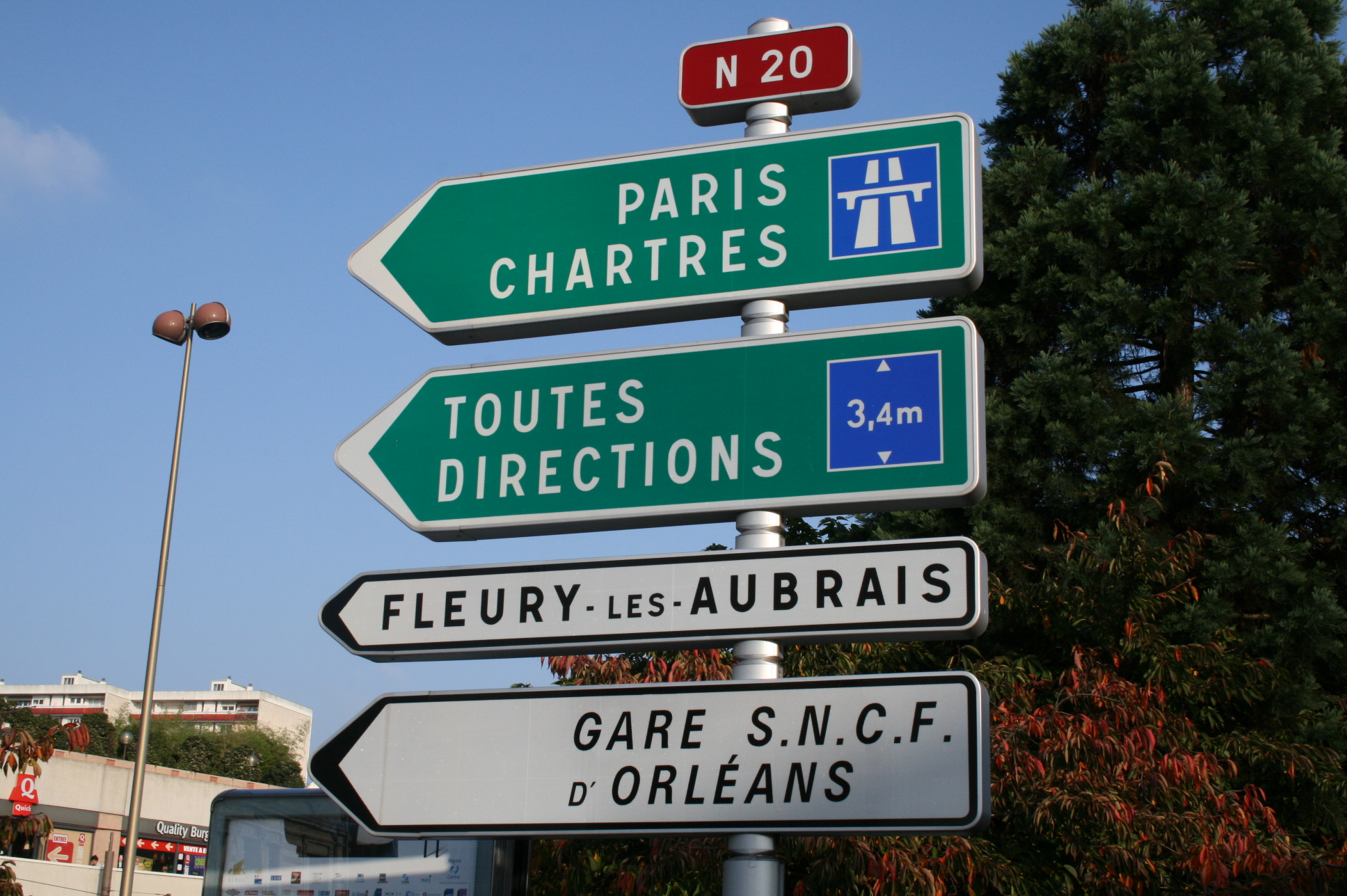
Road sign on Route D21 with green and white text (France)

Caractères (Characters) is a name of a sans-serif typeface family for road signs in France including its overseas territories, as well as Monaco, Luxembourg, and Francophone countries in Africa, and formerly in Spain and Portugal. There are four variants: L1, L2, L4 and L5. Caractères L1 is the bold variant, usually a black typeface on white background; used on road signs, which indicate places nearby, and uppercase only. L2 is the medium variant which is a white typeface on green background for Routes Nationales or blue backgrounds for Autoroutes; used on road signs which indicate distant places, and also uppercase only. L4 is the italic variant, which is like the L1 variant, is also a black typeface on white background, used on road signs within a city to indicate nearby places and public facilities, in both uppercase and lowercase. L5 is an upright companion to the L4 font, used for historical monuments and other places of interest.
