= Ingrid Godon =

Belgian illustrator

- Born: 29 August 1958 (age 67); Wilrijk, Belgium
- Known for: Illustration
- Awards: Boekenpauw 2001 Wachten op Matroos 2015 Ik denk; Gouden Griffel 2001 Wachten op Matroos

Ingrid Godon (born 29 August 1958) is a Flemish illustrator of children's literature.

== Career ==
She won the Prijs van de Kinder- en Jeugdjury voor het boek in Vlaanderen in 1988 and in 1989 for respectively illustrating the books Pius en Pepijn and Niemand mag het weten written by Gerda van Cleemput. She also won the award in 1988 for illustrating the book Mijn broer is een punker by Maria Heylen.

In 2001, Godon and André Sollie won the Gouden Griffel award for their book Wachten op Matroos (2000). She also won a Vlag en Wimpel award for her illustrations in the book. In Flanders the book was awarded the Boekenpauw and Boekenwelp awards. The English translation of the book Hello, Sailor was published in 2003. The book caused controversy in England as it was argued that its inclusion in school curricula effectively forced schools to include books with homosexual characters.

She also received a Boekenpauw award in 2015 for her illustrations in the book Ik denk written by Toon Tellegen. In 2009, she received a Boekenpluim award for illustrating the book Morgen was het feest, also written by Toon Tellegen.

Over the years Godon has illustrated over a hundred children's books for numerous authors.

== Awards ==
- 1988: Prijs van de Kinder- en Jeugdjury voor het boek in Vlaanderen, Mijn broer is een punker
- 1988: Prijs van de Kinder- en Jeugdjury voor het boek in Vlaanderen, Pius en Pepijn
- 1989: Prijs van de Kinder- en Jeugdjury voor het boek in Vlaanderen, Niemand mag het weten
- 2001: Boekenpauw, Wachten op Matroos
- 2001: Boekenwelp, Wachten op Matroos
- 2001: Vlag en Wimpel, Wachten op Matroos
- 2001: Gouden Griffel, Wachten op Matroos (with André Sollie)
- 2009: Boekenpluim, Morgen was het feest
- 2015: Boekenpauw, Ik denk
- 2026: Boon for Children's and youth literature, De vrouw en zijn hoofd (met Benny Lindelauf)
