= Francis Dessain =

Belgian footballer, manager, and sports leader

Personal information
- Full name: Francis Joseph Dessain
- Date of birth: 25 July 1875
- Place of birth: Mechelen, Belgium
- Date of death: 23 August 1951 (aged 76)
- Place of death: Mechelen, Belgium
- Position: Forward

Senior career*
Years	Team	Apps	(Gls)
1889–1894	Birmingham Oratory; School FC		
1894–1896	Christ Church FC		
1896–1905	Royal Léopold FC		
1905–1906	Mechelen		

International career
1904	Belgium	1	(0)

Managerial career
- 1911–1924: Mechelen
2nd president of Mechelen
In office 1906–1951
Preceded by	Théophile Delvaulx
Succeeded by	Patrick Dessain
5th President of Royal Belgian Football Association
In office 1945–1951
Preceded by	Oscar van Kesbeeck
Succeeded by	Georges Hermesse
- * Club domestic league appearances and goals

Francis Joseph Dessain (25 July 1875 – 23 August 1951) was a Belgian lawyer, priest, and footballer who played as a forward for Royal Léopold at the turn of the century. He served as the fifth president of the Royal Belgian Football Association from 1945 until 1951, as well as the second president of K.V. Mechelen for 45 years, from 1906 until he died in 1951, being replaced by his nephew Patrick Dessain.

He is the younger brother of Charles Dessain, who was mayor of Mechelen for over 25 years.

== Early life and education ==
Born to a Belgian father and an Irish mother in Mechelen on 25 July 1875, Dessain was sent abroad to complete his law studies in England, doing so at the Birmingham Oratory and at Christ Church, Oxford. While there, he developed a deep interest for football, joining the Oratory School FC in 1889, aged 14, and then playing for the second football team of the Christ Church club, where he also played in its first rugby and cricket teams in 1895 and 1896, and even won several first prizes in the shot put and hammer throw.

== Sporting career ==
=== Playing career ===
Upon his return to Belgium, Dessain joined Royal Léopold in late 1896, helping his side reach back-to-back finals in the Challenge International du Nord in 1898 and 1899, serving as captain on the latter final, held at Tourcoing on 26 March, which ended in a 4–1 victory over Club Brugge. He remained loyal to the club for nearly a decade, until 1905, when he retired at the age of 30.

On 3 January 1904, the 28-year-old Dessain captained Belgium in the 1904 Coupe Vanden Abeele, a friendly cup duel between the Low Countries, leading his side to a 6–4 victory over Cees van Hasselt's Netherlands.

=== Managerial career ===
Around 1905, Dessain moved to the newly created K.V. Mechelen, becoming its president in September 1906, a position he held for 45 years, until August 1951. During his long presidential reign of Mechelen, he also acted as the team's manager for 13 years, from 1911 until 1924, when he was replaced by William Maxwell. He was also one of the founders and directors of the Union Métropolitaine, the result of the merger of many schools and other Catholic associations, and which was admitted to the UBSSA in 1907. On 27 August 1911, Dessain, along with a few other people, acquired a 2.5-acre site on which the club still plays today, the so-called Achter de Kazerne ("Behind the Army Barracks").

His position as president of Mechelen allowed him to rise through the ranks within the RBFA, becoming a member of its central committee in 1911, the vice-president of its committee in 1913, the RBFA's vice-president in 1937, and finally its fifth president on 30 June 1945, a position that he also held until he died in Mechelen on 23 August 1951, at the age of 76, being then replaced by Georges Hermesse.

== Outside sports ==
At the start of the First World War, his older brother Charles, then mayor of Mechelen, was in England with a large group of Mechelen refugees, so Francis was employed for a few months as the city's acting mayor, which was a highly exceptional circumstance at the time. In December 1915, Dessain entered the seminary, being ordained a priest on 2 January 1921, and becoming a canon later that year. He then became the private secretary to Cardinals Désiré-Joseph Mercier and Groep Van Roey, archbishops of Mechelen, and he also taught at the Sint-Romboutscollege in Mechelen.

Dessain was also a deputy director of an insurance company, and manager of the printing company H. Dessain.

== Honours ==
=== Club ===
Royal Léopold

- Belgian First Division
  - Runner-up (1): 1901–02
- Challenge International du Nord
  - Champions (2): 1898 and 1899
  - Runner-up (1): 1901

=== International ===
Belgium

- Coupe Vanden Abeele:
  - Champions (1): 1904

== See also ==
- List of Belgium national football team captains
