= Leo Timmers =

Belgian children's book writer and illustrator (born 1970)

- Born: 1970 (age 55–56)
- Occupations: Writer and illustrator
- Known for: Children's books
- Notable work: Monkey on the Run, Elephant Island

Leo Timmers (born 1970) is a Belgian children's book writer and illustrator.

== Background ==
He started creating comics when he was eight or nine years old, and self-published one of them a few years later. He studied graphic design and published his first real book, Blij met mij, in 2000.

His 2019 book Monkey on the Run was listed as one of the 10 best illustrated books of the year by The New York Times. In 2022, Elephant Island was listed as one of the 10 best children's books of the year by The New York Times. His works have been translated in at least 25 languages.

Two of his works have been turned into animated series: Ziggy and the zootram and Derek the Deep-Sea Doctor.

== Bibliography ==
Timmers has published many books; below is a selection of those that have been translated in English.

- Kind Crocodile
- Elephant Island
- Where is the dragon
- Monkey on the Run.
- Busy builders, busy week
- Franky
- Bang
- All through my town
- The magical life of mr. Renny
- Crow
- Who is driving?
- Een huis voor Harry was awarded "Picture Book of the Year" of 2019 in the Netherlands
