= Vereecken =

Vereecken is a Belgian surname. Notable people with the surname include:

- Gustave Vereecken (born 1913), Belgian basketball player
- Kathleen Vereecken (born 1962), Belgian writer
- Nicolas Vereecken (born 1990), Belgian former cyclist
