= Tom Lanoye =

Belgian poet and playwright (born 1958)

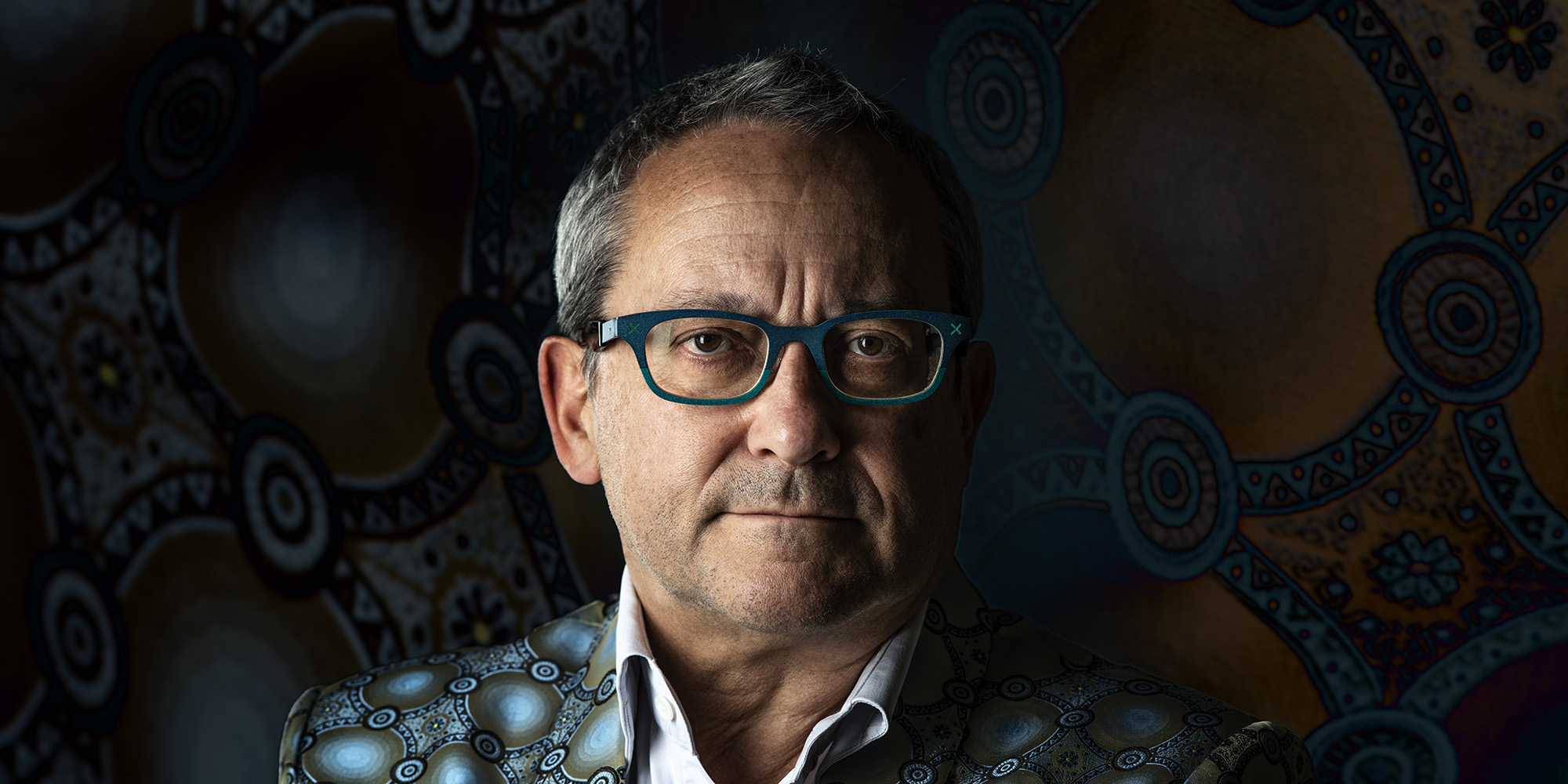
- Lanoye in 2022
- Born: Tom Emiel Gerardine Aloïs Lanoye; 27 August 1958 (age 67); Sint-Niklaas, Belgium
- Occupations: novelist, poet

Tom Lanoye (/lɑːnwɑː/; born 27 August 1958) is a Belgian novelist, poet, columnist, screenwriter and playwright. He is one of the most widely read and honoured authors in his language area (the Netherlands and Flanders), and makes regular appearances at all the major European theatre festivals. He was born in Sint-Niklaas.

== Biography ==
Lanoye was the youngest son of a butcher. He attended the catholic Sint-Jozef-Klein-Seminarie College in Sint-Niklaas. At the time it was a single-sex boys' school. He studied Germanic Philology and Sociology at Ghent University. Still a student, he self-published his first work. In his own words, 'Just like all the punk bands did in those days: out of dissatisfaction with the existing structures, and to learn the trade from the inside out'.

Lanoye lives and works in Antwerp and Cape Town (South Africa). His literary work has been published and/or performed in over fifteen languages.

== Literary work ==
In 1985 Lanoye published his prose debut, the semi-autobiographical novel Een slagerszoon met een brilletje (A Butcher's Son with Spectacles). His other books include Alles moet weg (Everything Has To Go) (1988), the melancholy coming-of-age novel Kartonnen dozen (Cardboard Boxes) (1991) and the trilogy comprising Het Goddelijke Monster (The Divine Monster), Zwarte tranen (Black Tears) and Boze tongen (Spiteful Tongues) which describes the disintegration of a rich and corrupt Belgian family. A ten-part television series based on this trilogy was broadcast on 'Eén', the Flemish public broadcaster's main channel, in autumn 2011.

Lanoye has made an impression as a contemporary dramatist abroad with his 12-hour verse adaptation of eight of Shakespeare's history plays entitled Ten Oorlog (To War) (1997). It has been performed in German at the Salzburg Festival and later on in several German stagings and cities. Several of his other plays — he wrote more than thirty — have been played at great festivals in Avignon, Amsterdam, Vienna, Paris and the Ruhr.

Lanoye started out as an enfant terrible, but has become an established writer who devotes himself to all forms of text and writing, for books, newspapers, periodicals and printed matter as well as for plays, cabaret and vocal performances, in any form whatsoever and in the broadest sense of the word' (a quote from the articles of association of his company, the LLC L.A.N.O.Y.E., set up in 1992).

In theatres he regularly performs literary shows, more like theatrical monologues than lectures.

Several of his books and plays won prizes. In 2007 he was granted the Gouden Ganzenveer for his entire collection of work and received an honorary doctorate from Antwerp University. In 2013 he again received a prize for his 'oeuvre so far' — the Constantijn Huygens Prize, the most important one in the Dutch language area.

His 2006 novel Het derde huwelijk was adapted by film director David Lambert for the 2018 film Third Wedding (Troisièmes noces).

== Bibliography ==
- 1980 – Maar nog zo goed als nieuw (poetry)
- 1981 – Neon! Een elegisch rockgedicht (poetry)
- 1982 – Gent-Wevelgem (poetry)
- 1983 – De nagelaten gedichten (poetry)
- 1983 – De glazen klomp (poetry)
- 1983 – Rozegeur en Maneschijn (essays)
- 1984 – In de piste (poetry)
- 1984 – Bagger (poetry)
- 1985 – Een slagerszoon met een brilletje (stories)
- 1986 – Het cirkus van de slechte smaak (criticism)
- 1988 – Alles moet weg (novel)
- 1989 – Vroeger was ik beter (essays)
- 1989 – De Canadese Muur (play, written with Herman Brusselmans)
- 1989 – Gespleten en bescheten (criticism)
- 1990 – Hanestaart (poetry)
- 1991 – Kartonnen dozen (novel)
- 1991 – Blankenberge (play)
- 1991 – Bij Jules en Alice (play)
- 1992 – Doen! (columns/essays)
- 1993 – De schoonheid van een total loss (play)
- 1993 – Celibaat (play, after Gerard Walschap)
- 1994 – Spek en bonen (stories)
- 1994 – Maten en gewichten (criticism)
- 1997 – Het goddelijke monster (novel)
- 1997 – Ten oorlog (play lasting 12 hours. Lanoye wrote this together with Luk Perceval, after The War of the Roses by Shakespeare. In Germany it was performed under the title Schlachten!)
- 1999 – Zwarte Tranen (novel)
- 2001 – Tekst & uitleg/Woorden met vleugels (criticism)
- 2001 – Mamma Medea (play, after Euripides and Apollonius of Rhodes)
- 2002 – Niemands Land. Gedichten uit de Groote Oorlog, Prometheus, Amsterdam (including a free translation of Wilfred Owen's 1917 poem Dulce et Decorum est)
- 2002 – Boze Tongen (novel, 2003 Golden Owl Public Prize and 2005 Inktaap Award)
- 2003 – Veldslag voor een man alleen (play)
- 2004 – Diplodocus Deks (play)
- 2004 – De Jossen (play)
- 2004 – Overkant (poetry)
- 2004 – Het vroegste vitriool (criticism)
- 2004 – Vitriool voor gevorderden (criticism)
- 2005 – Stadsgedichten (poetry); includes the poems and speeches he wrote as the first City poet of Antwerp (2003-2004)
- 2005 – De meeste gedichten (poetry)
- 2005 – Fort Europa (play)
- 2006 – Mijn Vriend Laarmans door Tom Lanoye/ Mijn vriend Boorman door Arnon Grunberg (two letters)
- 2006 – Het derde huwelijk (novel)
- 2006 – Mefisto for ever (play, freely adapted from the Klaus Mann's novel Mephisto)
- 2007 – Schermutseling (criticism)
- 2008 – Atropa. De wraak van de vrede (play, freely adapted from Euripides, George W. Bush, Donald Rumsfeld and Curzio Malaparte)
- 2008 – Woest (solo performance)
- 2008 – Alles eender (ganzenpas) (play)
- 2009 – Sprakeloos (novel)
- 2011 – Bloed en Rozen (play)
- 2011 – De Russen! Ivanov meets Platonov (play, freely adapted from Anton Chekhov)
- 2012 – Heldere hemel (based on the aircraft accident near Kortrijk)
- 2013 - Gelukkige Slaven (novel)
- 2014 - Hamlet vs Hamlet (play, based on Shakespeare)
- 2015 – Koningin Lear (play, based on Shakespeare)
- 2015 – Revue Ravage. Death of a politician (play)
- 2015 – Gaz. Pleidooi van een gedoemde moeder (novella/monologue)
- 2016 – Revue Lanoye. Filippica(criticism)
- 2017 – Zuivering (novel)
- 2017 – De felomstreden kroon en deerniswekkende dood van koning Edward II & zijn favoriet jonkheer Gaveston, onder wiens betovering hij zich afkeerde van zijn koningin en kroonprins, tot steeds grotere woede van de verzamelde adel en het voor de rest onwetende gewone volk (Christopher Marlowe)
- 2018 – Lanoye 60. Groepsportret met brilletje (scrapbook)
- 2019 - Vrij - wij? (Poetry gift, free publication for Poetry Week, a national promotional campaign in the Low Countries)
- 2019 - Verloren vader (play for Theater Na de Dam)
- 2019 - Wie is bang (play)
- 2019 - Hendrik VI & Margaretha di Napoli (play)
- 2022 - De draaischijf (novel)
- 2022 - OustFaust (play, based on Goethe)
- 2022 - Bonaparte. Monoloog met demonen (libretto)
- 2022 - De störm (play, based on Shakespeare)

== Main awards ==
- 1992 – Humo's Golden Bookmark for Kartonnen dozen
- 1998 – Océ Podium Prize for Ten oorlog
- 1998 – Proscenium Prize for Ten oorlog
- 1998 – Humo's Golden Bookmark for Het goddelijke monster
- 2000 – Innovationspreis Theatertreffen Berlin for Schlachten! (Ten oorlog)
- 2000 – The Golden Owl Public Prize for Zwarte Tranen
- 2000 – Humo's Golden Bookmark for Zwarte Tranen
- 2003 – The Golden Owl Literature Prize for Boze Tongen
- 2007 – The Gouden Ganzenveer for his oeuvre
- 2007 – Honorary Doctorate from the University of Antwerp
- 2010 – The Golden Owl Public Prize for Sprakeloos
- 2011 – The Henriette Roland Holst Prize for Sprakeloos
- 2013 – the Constantijn Huygens Prize for his oeuvre
- 2024 – Prijs der Nederlandse Letteren
