= Moeyaert =

Moeyaert is a surname. Notable persons with the surname include:

- Bart Moeyaert (born 1964), Belgian writer
- Claes Corneliszoon Moeyaert (1592–1655), Catholic Dutch painter
