= Falling (Provoost novel) =

1994 novel by Anne Provoost

- The English edition of Falling
- Author: Anne Provoost
- Original title: Vallen
- Translator: John Nieuwenbuizen
- Cover artist: Ruth Grüner; Maikka Trupp
- Language: Dutch
- Genre: Novel
- Publisher: Houtekiet/Fontein
- Publication date: 1994
- Publication place: Belgium
- English publication date: 1997, by Allen & Unwin
- Media type: Print (Hardback & Paperback)
- Pages: 288 pp
- ISBN: 1-86448-444-6
- OCLC: 40659153

Falling (1994) (orig. Dutch Vallen) is a novel by the Flemish author Anne Provoost.

== Background ==
This was Anne Provoost's second novel and quickly gained an international reputation. Among the awards it won were two for young people's literature, representing the area of speciality that the author has made her own. In this case it addresses the threat posed by the racist ideology of right-wing parties following the recent electoral successes of the Vlaams Blok after its shift to an aggressive policy on immigration. Anne Provoost was later to make the plea not to try to protect the young by shielding them from discussion of uncomfortable issues in her essay Hopelessness and consolation; growing up, willing or not (2000). She has also perceived the additional threat to civil liberties by forms of right-wing religious fundamentalism and advised organising to resist this danger too.

== Plot summary ==
Anne Provoost's novels are invariably related from the point of view of a young person caught up in problems of adult making which they have difficulty comprehending. In this case, the teenage Lucas is taken on a long summer visit to his late grandfather’s home in the Ardennes by his mother. He has been brought up by her in ignorance of the fact that during World War II his grandfather had informed on the nuns in the local convent who were harbouring Jewish children. He is therefore at a loss to understand the conflicting attitudes he encounters in the town. He is particularly targeted by the political activist Benoit, for whom his grandfather was a hero, and persuaded to take reluctant part in a couple of right-wing actions against the Moroccan immigrants who have taken over a run-down quarter of the town.

In the meantime he has befriended the young American-born Caitlin, who dreams of becoming a dancer. She is in fact the daughter of one of the children betrayed by his grandfather, all of whom had survived Auschwitz. She also stands for liberal attitudes and as an outsider too is not tainted by the small-town narrow mindedness from which Lucas has to suffer. Just as he is preparing to commit himself to Caitlin and what she stands for, she is involved in a crash and Lucas is only able to rescue her from the burning car by sawing off her trapped foot. At first he is treated as a hero, but Benoit, fearing denunciation by Lucas, uses his position as a journalist to question his actions.

The plot of the novel has three times been adapted for theatre: in Brussels (1997), Hamme (2003) and Amsterdam (2006). In addition it was made into an English-language feature film in 2001 by Hans Herbots. Among the liberties taken with the text was the decision to move the scene of action, rather more credibly, to the south of France and the hint of a resolution through forgiveness not present in the novel.

== Awards and nominations ==
=== 1995 ===
- The Woutertje Pieterse Prijs
- The Boekenleeuw
- The Gouden Uil
- The Zilveren Griffel
- Listed on White Ravens (a premium label for books of international interest which deserve a wider reception)

=== 1996 ===
- Honour List IBBY
- de Interprovinciale Prijs voor Jeugdliteratuur

=== 1997 ===
- Nominated for the Prix du Lecteur from Mans and Sarthe in France

=== 2000 ===
- Lavki-award

== Publishing history ==
- 1994, Belgium, Houtekiet (ISBN 978-9052402789), pub date 1994, paperback (Vallen first edition in Dutch))
- 1997, UK, Allen & Unwin (ISBN 978-1864484441), pub date 1 September 1997, paperback (first edition in English)
