= Stefan Brijs =

Belgian novelist writing in Dutch

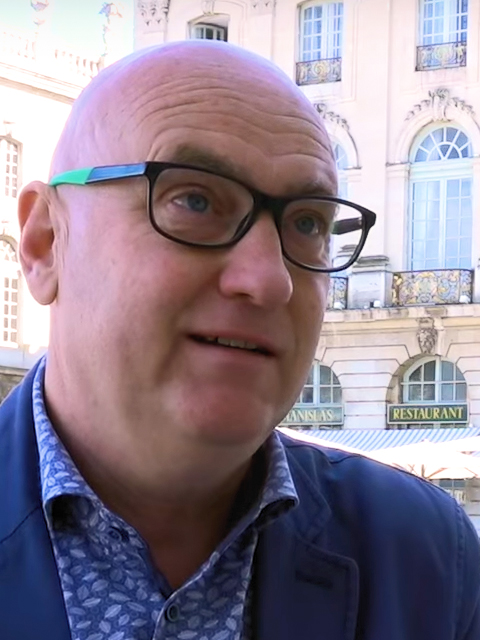
- Stefan Brijs (2018)
- Born: 29 December 1969 (age 56); Genk, Belgium
- Occupation: novelist
- Known for: The Angel Maker

Stefan Brijs (born 29 December 1969) is a Belgian novelist writing in Dutch.

== Biography ==
Stefan Brijs was born in 1969 in Genk, where he lived most of his life. He finished his studies for teacher in 1990. Since 1999 he is a full-time writer. In 2003 he moved to the province of Antwerp.

== Bibliography ==
=== Early works ===
- De verwording (1997), published by Atlas.
- Kruistochten (1998) and a sequel De vergeethoek from 2003, the former about the burial places of Flemish writers, the latter about forgotten Flemish writers.
- Arend (2000), reached its 6th printing in 2010.
- Villa Keetje Tippel (2001)
- Twee levens (2001), a Christmas novella, fourth printing in 2006; was translated in Italian by Franco Paris and published by Fazi

=== The Angel Maker ===
De engelenmaker (2005) reached its 25th printing in Dutch in 2011, selling over 125,000 copies. It won the 2006 Readers' Golden Owl, the five-yearly Prize for Prose of the Royal Academy for Dutch Language and Literature, the 2011 Euregio Literatuurprijs (an award for novels available in Dutch, French and German) and the 2010 Prix des Lecteurs Cognac at the Littératures européennes Cognac festival. It was nominated for the 2006 Libris Literatuurprijs and made the longlist of the 2010 International Dublin Literary Award.

It was translated in English as The Angel Maker by Hester Velmans, published in the UK by Weidenfeld & Nicolson and in the US by Penguin Books. The first translation was the German translation Der Engelmacher, from 2006. The French translation Le Faiseur d'anges by Daniel Cunin was published by Héloïse d'Ormesson. It was translated in Italian by Franco Paris, published by Fazi. The Russian translation by Irina Trofimova and Vera Trenina was published by Zakharov. The book has also been translated in Turkish and Greek in 2007, in Hungarian in 2008, in Hebrew and Spanish in 2009, and in Danish in 2011. The rights for a Chinese translation were sold in October 2011.

=== Later works ===
- Korrels in Gods Grote Zandbak, essays about writers from Turnhout
- Post voor mevrouw Bromley (Mail for Miss Bromley) is the 2011 novel, about people refusing to go to war during World War I.
