= Permeke Library =

Library in Antwerp, Belgium

Coordinates: 51.22174°N 4.42133°E

- Bibliotheek Permeke
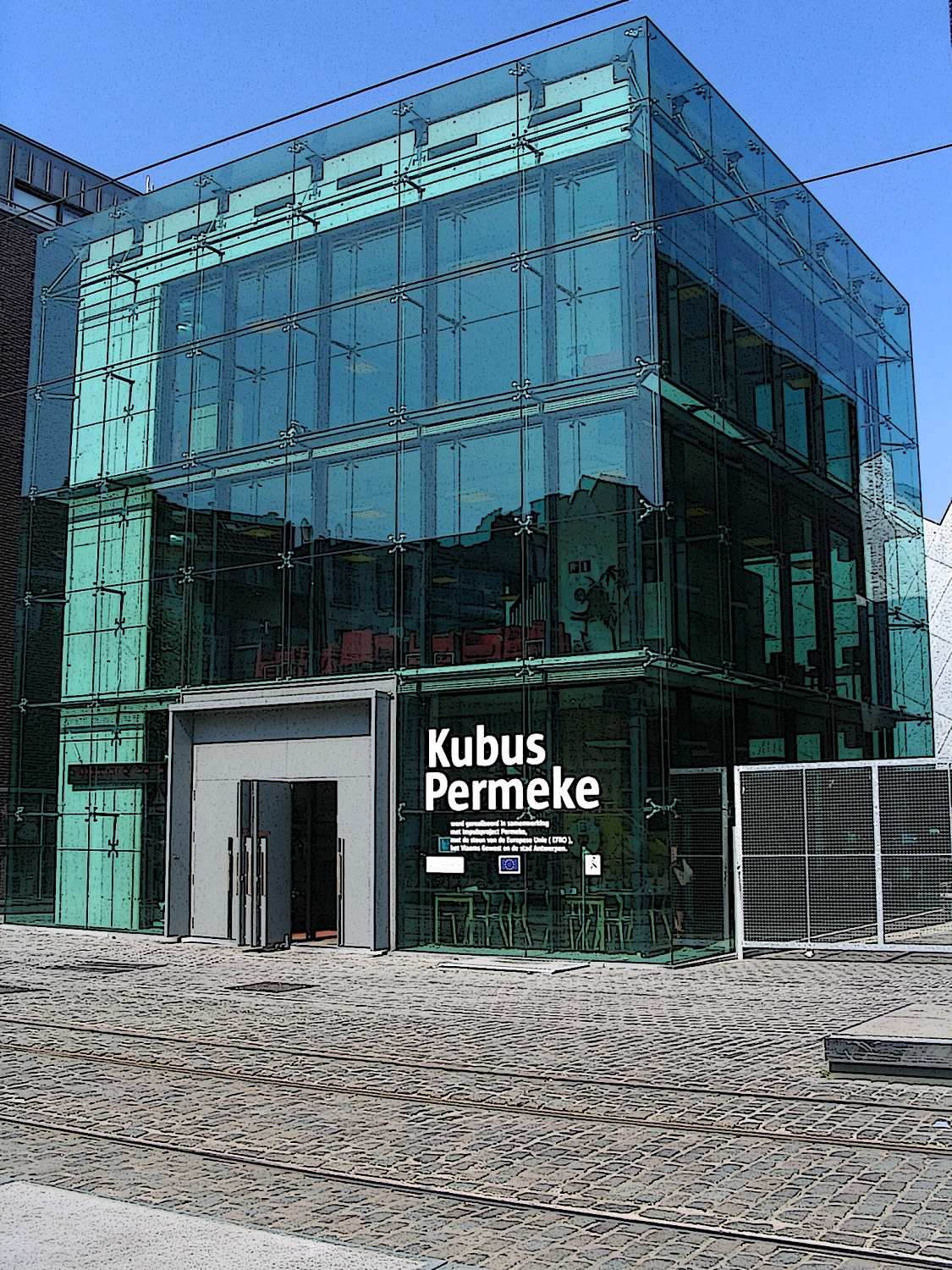
- Location: De Coninckplein, Antwerp, Belgium
- Established: 2005; 20 years ago

Other information
- Website: Official website

The Permeke Library (Dutch: Bibliotheek Permeke) is the main public library in Antwerp, Belgium. The library is open 7 days per week and visited by about 2,200 visitors a day.

== History ==
The library is named after Oscar Permeke, a cousin of Constant Permeke, who used to run the garage Permeke Motors in the building previously. In 1982, the Permeke garage went bankrupt and closed its doors.

The library opened on 22 April 2005, the last day on which Antwerp held the title of World Book Capital. The public library located at the Lange Nieuwstraat had closed on 1 September 2004.

The poem Binnen by Belgian writer and poet Bart Moeyaert is on display in the library.
