= Jef Aerts =

Belgian author

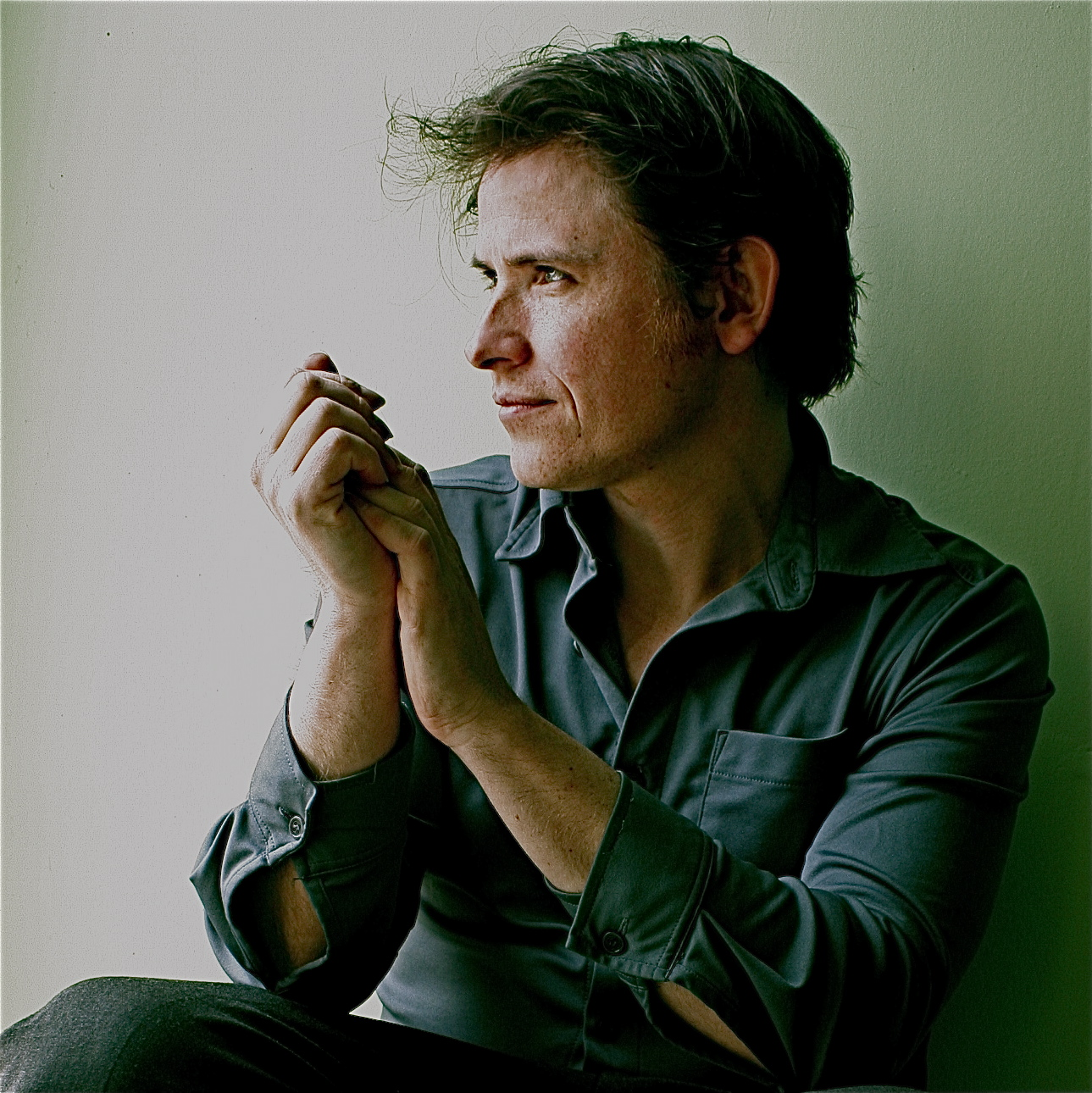
Jef Aerts

Jef Aerts (born 26 May 1972) is a Belgian writer of children’s and youth literature.

== Life and career ==
After publishing four novels, poetry and theater, Jef Aerts has been writing for young readers since 2012.

For the picture book Bigger than a Dream he worked with the Swedish-Dutch illustrator Marit Törnqvist. In 2014 this book was awarded the Book Lion (Boekenleeuw, prize for the best Dutch-language children's book).

Jef Aerts received four Zilveren Griffel awards: for Bigger than a Dream, Fish don’t melt, The Blue Wings and Robber's Cub (illustrated by Martijn van der Linden).

Aerts’ children’s and youth books have been translated and sold in more than 18 languages, including English, German, Swedish, Chinese, Korean, Russian and Persian. His work is nominated for the international Astrid Lindgren Memorial Award 2026.

Jef Aerts lives and writes in a small farm close to Leuven.

== Works (selection) ==
- The Little Paradise (Het kleine paradijs, 2012)
- Bigger than a Dream (Groter dan een droom, 2013)
- Fish don’t Melt (Vissen smelten niet, 2013)
- Horse in Boots (Paard met laarzen, 2015)
- Cherry Blossom and Paper Planes (Kersenhemel, 2017)
- The Blue Wings (De blauwe vleugels, 2018)
- Every Day Someone Else (Elke dag iemand anders, 2020)
- Ronke's Night (De nacht van Ronke, 2021)
- Robber's Cub (Roversjong, 2024)

== Awards and nominations (selection) ==
- 2014: Zilveren griffel, Groter dan een droom
- 2014: White Raven, Groter dan een droom
- 2014: Boekenleeuw, Groter dan een droom
- 2014: Zilveren Griffel, Vissen smelten niet
- 2018: Vlag en Wimpel, Kersenhemel
- 2019: Zilveren Griffel, De blauwe vleugels
- 2020: Laureate IBBY Honour List, De blauwe vleugels
- 2024: Finalist Premio Strega Ragazze e Raggazi, Groter dan een droom
- 2025: Zilveren Griffel, Roversjong
- Nomination Astrid Lindgren Memorial Award 2026
