= Els Beerten =

Flemish writer of children's literature

- Born: 27 March 1959 (age 67) Hasselt, Belgium
- Notable awards: Nienke van Hichtum-prijs 2009; Boekenleeuw 2009

Els Beerten (born 27 March 1959) is a Flemish writer of children's literature.

== Career ==
Beerten made her debut in 1987 with the book Scènes.

In 2004, she received the Gouden Zoen award for her book Lopen voor je leven.

In 2009, she won the Nienke van Hichtum-prijs, the Boekenleeuw and the Gouden Boekenuil awards for her book Allemaal willen we de hemel (2008), a story that takes place during World War II. She also won the Lavki-prijs voor het Jeugdboek in 2011 and the Prijs van de Vlaamse Gemeenschap voor Jeugdliteratuur in 2013 for this book.

Her books have been illustrated by various illustrators including Kristien Aertssen, Geert Vervaeke and Fred de Heij.

== Awards ==
- 2004: Gouden Zoen, Lopen voor je leven
- 2009: Nienke van Hichtum-prijs, Allemaal willen we de hemel
- 2009: Boekenleeuw, Allemaal willen we de hemel
- 2009: Gouden Boekenuil, Allemaal willen we de hemel
- 2011: Lavki-prijs voor het Jeugdboek, Allemaal willen we de hemel
- 2013: Prijs van de Vlaamse Gemeenschap voor Jeugdliteratuur, Allemaal willen we de hemel
