= Kathleen Vereecken =

Belgian writer of novels, children's literature and non-fiction

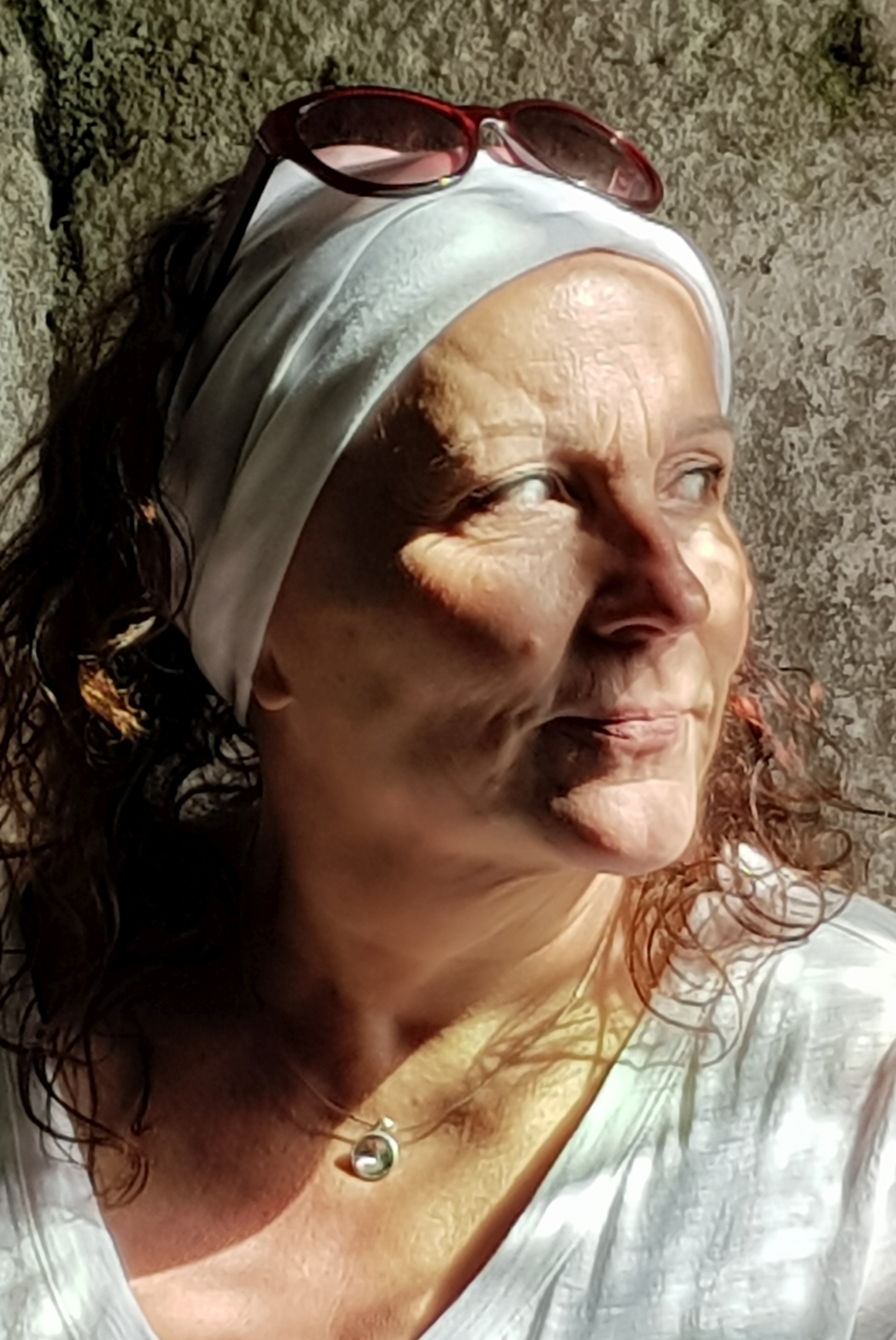
- Born: 14 December 1962 (age 62); Ghent, Belgium
- Notable awards: Boekenleeuw 2010 2019; Woutertje Pieterse Prijs 2019

Kathleen Vereecken (born 14 December 1962) is a Belgian writer of novels, children's literature and non-fiction.

She has won several awards for her work, including the Boekenleeuw (2010 and 2019) and Woutertje Pieterse Prijs (2019).

== Early life ==
Vereecken was born in 1962 as one of four daughters. She worked as a journalist for various women's magazines as well as the newspaper De Standaard.

== Career ==
Vereecken published her first book Het raadsel in het fluisterbos in 1993, a story that she submitted to a children's literature competition. Both her books Alle kleuren grijs (1997) and Kleine Cecilia (1999) were nominated for the Gouden Uil award. Many of her books have a historic theme such as Lara & Rebecca (2006), which takes places on a nineteenth century plantation in Louisiana, and Ik denk dat het liefde was (2009) and Zijdeman (2013) which both take place in 18th century Paris. Vereecken has also written various non-fiction books, such as Het broeikaseffect (2007) about global warming and Obama - De weg naar verandering (2009) about the life of Barack Obama.

In 2010, she won the Boekenleeuw for her book Ik denk dat het liefde was. She also won the Kleine Cervantes, the children's literature award of the city of Ghent, for this book in 2011.

In 2019, she won both the Woutertje Pieterse Prijs and the Boekenleeuw together with illustrator Charlotte Peys for their book Alles komt goed, altijd, a story about a girl during World War I.

Vereecken's books have been illustrated by various illustrators, including Anne Westerduin and Piet De Moor.

== Awards ==
- 2010: Boekenleeuw, Ik denk dat het liefde was
- 2011: Kleine Cervantes, Ik denk dat het liefde was
- 2019: Woutertje Pieterse Prijs, Alles komt goed, altijd (with Charlotte Peys)
- 2019: Boekenleeuw, Alles komt goed, altijd (with Charlotte Peys)

== Publications ==
- 1993: Het raadsel in het fluisterbos
- 1994: Gewoon vrienden
- 1995: Morgen word ik heks
- 1997: Alle kleuren grijs
- 1999: Kleine Cecilia
- 2001: Wreed schoon
- 2002: Kunnen heksen heksen?
- 2006: Lara & Rebecca
- 2006: Kippenvel op je huid en vlinders in je buik
- 2007: Het broeikaseffect
- 2008: Minnaressen
- 2009: Obama - De weg naar verandering
- 2009: Ik denk dat het liefde was
- 2011: Schaduwmoeder - Je kind afstaan voor adoptie
- 2013: Zijdeman
- 2014: Ik heet Jan en ik ben niets bijzonders (with Eva Mouton)
- 2016: Haar
- 2018: Alles komt goed, altijd
