= Boekenleeuw =

Belgian literary award

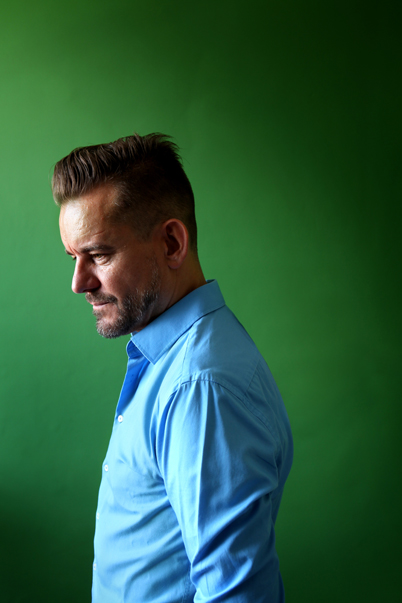
Bart Moeyaert has won the award six times.

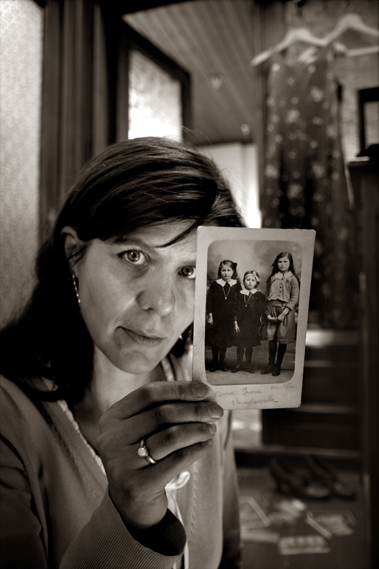
Anne Provoost has won the award three times.

The Boekenleeuw was a Flemish literary award for the best book in children's literature by a Flemish author. The award was given by Boek.be and the winner received €2,500. It has not been awarded since 2020.

== History ==
The Referendumprijs voor Vlaamse kinder- en jeugdboeken award was established in 1962. In 1986 this award was replaced by the Boekenleeuw and the Boekenwelp awards.

The award was not given in 2017 due to reorganisation at Boek.be and due to reassessment of what awards the organisation would continue to support. The award was given again in 2018 sponsored by association of authors, composers and publishers SABAM and GAU (Groep Algemene Uitgevers).

Several authors have received the award multiple times, including Bart Moeyaert (six times), Anne Provoost (three times) and Diane Broeckhoven (two times). Jean-Claude van Rijckeghem and Pat van Beirs have also won the Boekenleeuw as co-authors on two separate occasions.

== Winners ==
- 1986
  - Gregie De Maeyer, Pief Poef Paf, mijn broek zakt af
  - Lisette Hoogsteyns, Kinderen van de Falls
  - Riet Wille, Raadsels te koop
  - Edith Schreiber-Wicke (translation), Anton
- 1987
  - Diane Broeckhoven, Een dood vogeltje
  - Johan Ballegeer, Geen meiden aan boord
  - Monica Hughes (translation), Jacht in het donker
- 1988: Not awarded
- 1989
  - Jaak Dreesen, De vlieger van opa
  - Ron Langenus, Waar de zon ondergaat
  - Patricia MacLachlan (translation), Lieve, lange Sarah
- 1990: Detty Verreydt, Later wil ik stuntman worden
- 1991: Anne Provoost, Mijn tante is een grindewal
- 1992: Bart Moeyaert, Kus me
- 1993: Not awarded
- 1994: Diane Broeckhoven, Bruin zonder zon
- 1995: Anne Provoost, Vallen
- 1996: Bart Moeyaert, Blote handen
- 1997: Willy Van Doorselaer, De wraak van de marmerkweker
- 1998: Anne Provoost, De roos en het zwijn
- 1999: Sylvia Vanden Heede, Vos en Haas
- 2000: Bart Moeyaert, Het is de liefde die we niet begrijpen
- 2001: Ina Vandewijer, Witte pijn
- 2002: Heide Boonen, Duivelshanden
- 2003: Ed Franck, Abélard en Héloïse
- 2004: Bart Moeyaert, De schepping
- 2005: Kaat Vrancken, Cheffie is de baas
- 2006: Jean-Claude van Rijckeghem and Pat van Beirs, Jonkvrouw
- 2007: Marita de Sterck, Kwaad bloed
- 2008: Noëlla Elpers, Dolores
- 2009: Els Beerten, Allemaal willen we de hemel
- 2010: Kathleen Vereecken, Ik denk dat het liefde was
- 2011: Pat van Beirs and Jean-Claude van Rijckeghem, Galgenmeid
- 2012: Bart Moeyaert, De Melkweg
- 2013: Bart Moeyaert, Wie klopt daar?
- 2014: Jef Aerts, Groter dan een droom
- 2015: Michael De Cock, Veldslag om een hart
- 2016: Koos Meinderts, De zee zien
- 2017: Not awarded
- 2018: Annet Schaap, Lampje
- 2019: Kathleen Vereecken, Alles komt goed, altijd
- 2020: Bette Westera, Uit elkaar
