= Golden Book-Owl =

Belgian award for Dutch literature

Golden Book‑Owl
- Awarded for: Original Dutch‑language literature
- Country: Belgium
- Rewards: €25,000 and a sculpture by Ever Meulen
- First award: 1995
- Final award: 2017

The Golden Book‑Owl (De Gouden Boekenuil) was a major Belgian literary award for original Dutch language literature. It originated in 1995 as the Golden Owl (De Gouden Uil), re‑emerged after a funding hiatus in 2012 under the current English name, and was re‑branded once more in 2016 as the Fintro Literatuurprijs.

== Development ==
It has changed categories several times during the years. For the first five years it consisted of three columns: Fiction, non-fiction and children and youth books. As for 2000 to 2008 the non-fiction category was replaced by an audience award. In 2009 and 2010 it had even four categories: Literature, Youth Literature, Audience and Youth Audience. Since 2012 it is reduced to grown up literature prizes. The winner gets 25,000 euro and a work of art, the winner of the 100 reader's prize gets 2,500 euro and a MontBlanc pen.

== Laureates ==
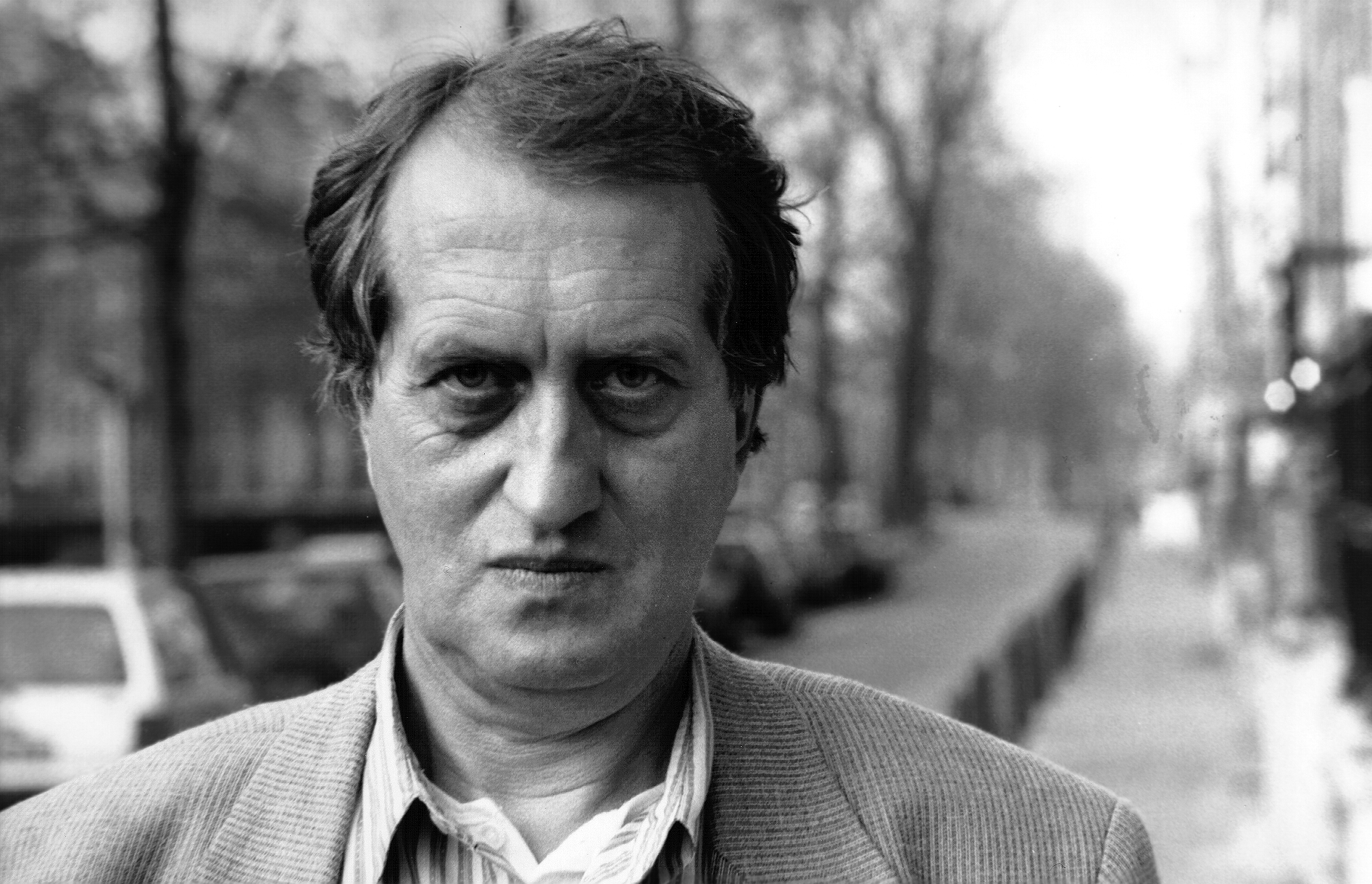
Gerrit Komrij

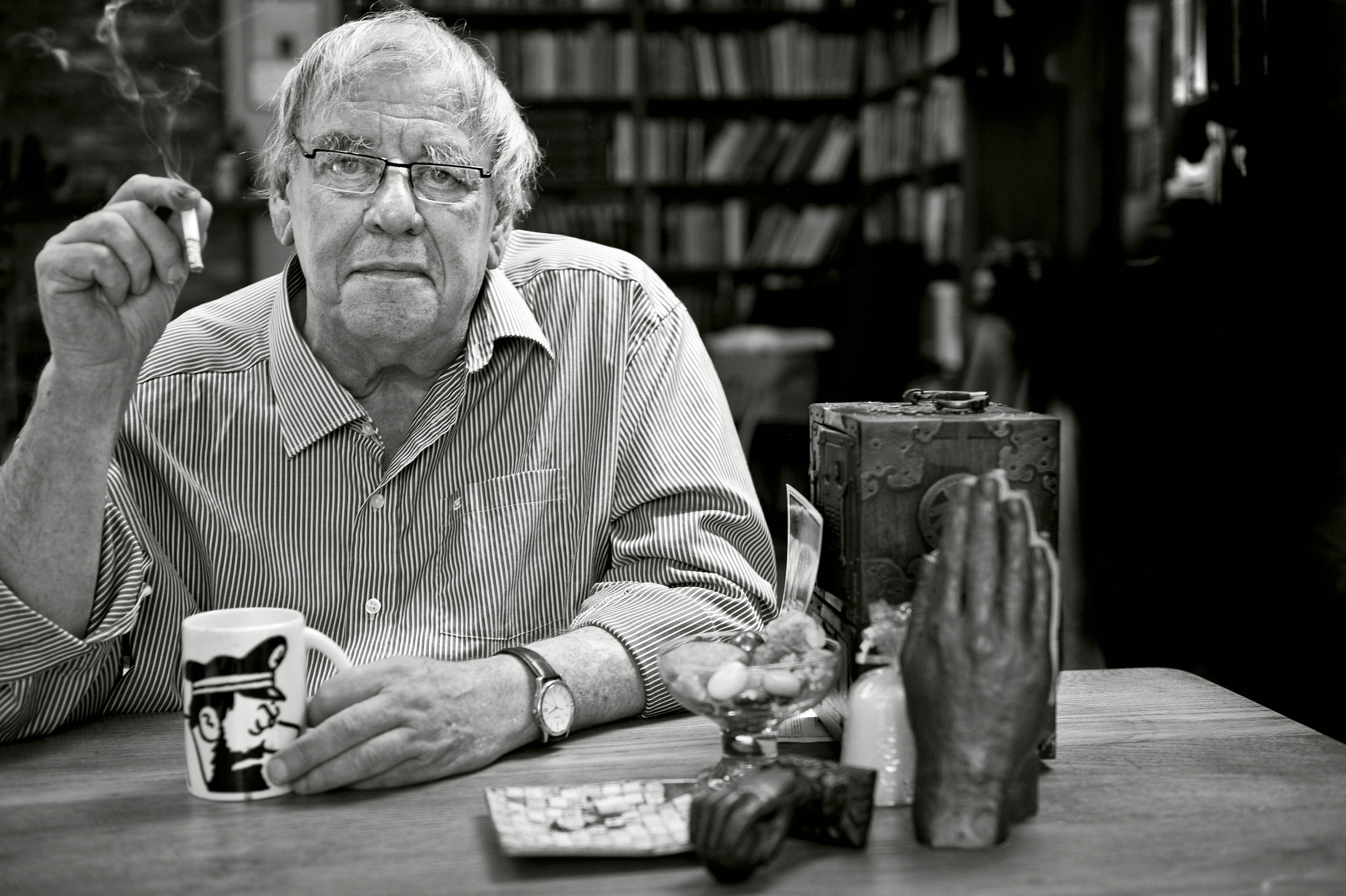
Jeroen Brouwers

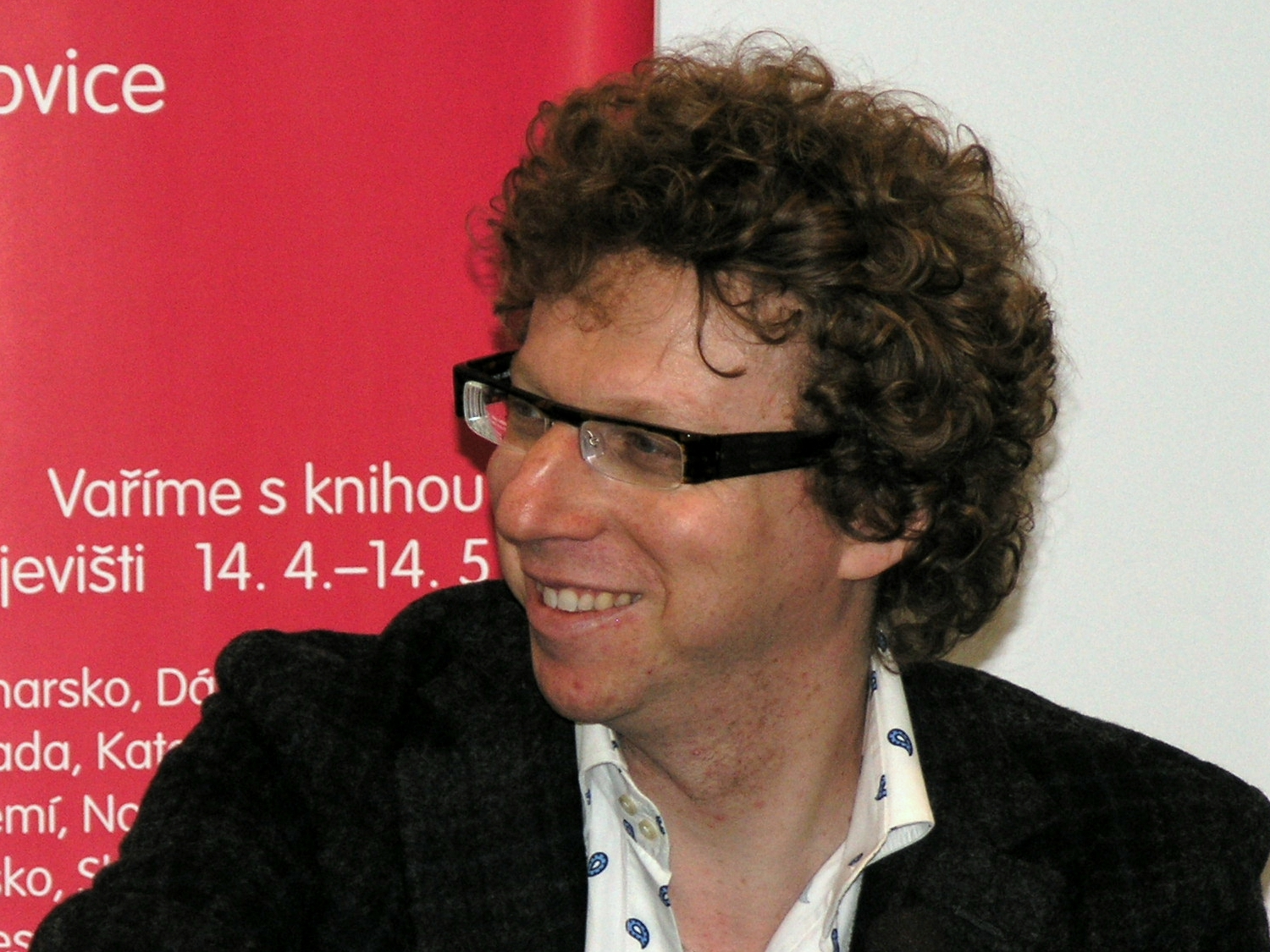
Arnon Grunberg

- 1995:
  - Fiction: Adriaan van Dis - Indische Duinen
  - Children and youth books: Anne Provoost - Vallen
  - Non-fiction: Jeroen Brouwers - Vlaamse Leeuwen
- 1996
  - Fiction: Guido van Heulendonk - Paarden Zijn Ook Varkens
  - Children and youth books: Anton Quintana - Het Boek van Bod Pa
  - Non-fiction: Joris van Parys - Frans Masereel, een biografie
- 1997
  - Fiction: A.F.Th. van der Heijden - Het Hof van Barmhartigheid & Onder het Plaveisel het Moeras
  - Children and youth books: Joke van Leeuwen - Iep!
  - Non-fiction: Elsbeth Etty - Liefde is Heel het leven
- 1998
  - Fiction: Marcel Möring - In Babylon
  - Children and youth books: Peter van Gestel - Mariken
  - Non-fiction: Leonard Blussé - Bitters Bruid
- 1999
  - Fiction: Geerten Meijsing - Tussen Mes en Keel
  - Children and youth books: Rita Verschuur - Jubeltenen
  - Non-fiction: Gerrit Komrij - In Liefde Bloeyende
- 2000
  - Literature Prize: Peter Verhelst - Tongkat
  - Youth Literature Prize: Toon Tellegen - De Genezing van de Krekel
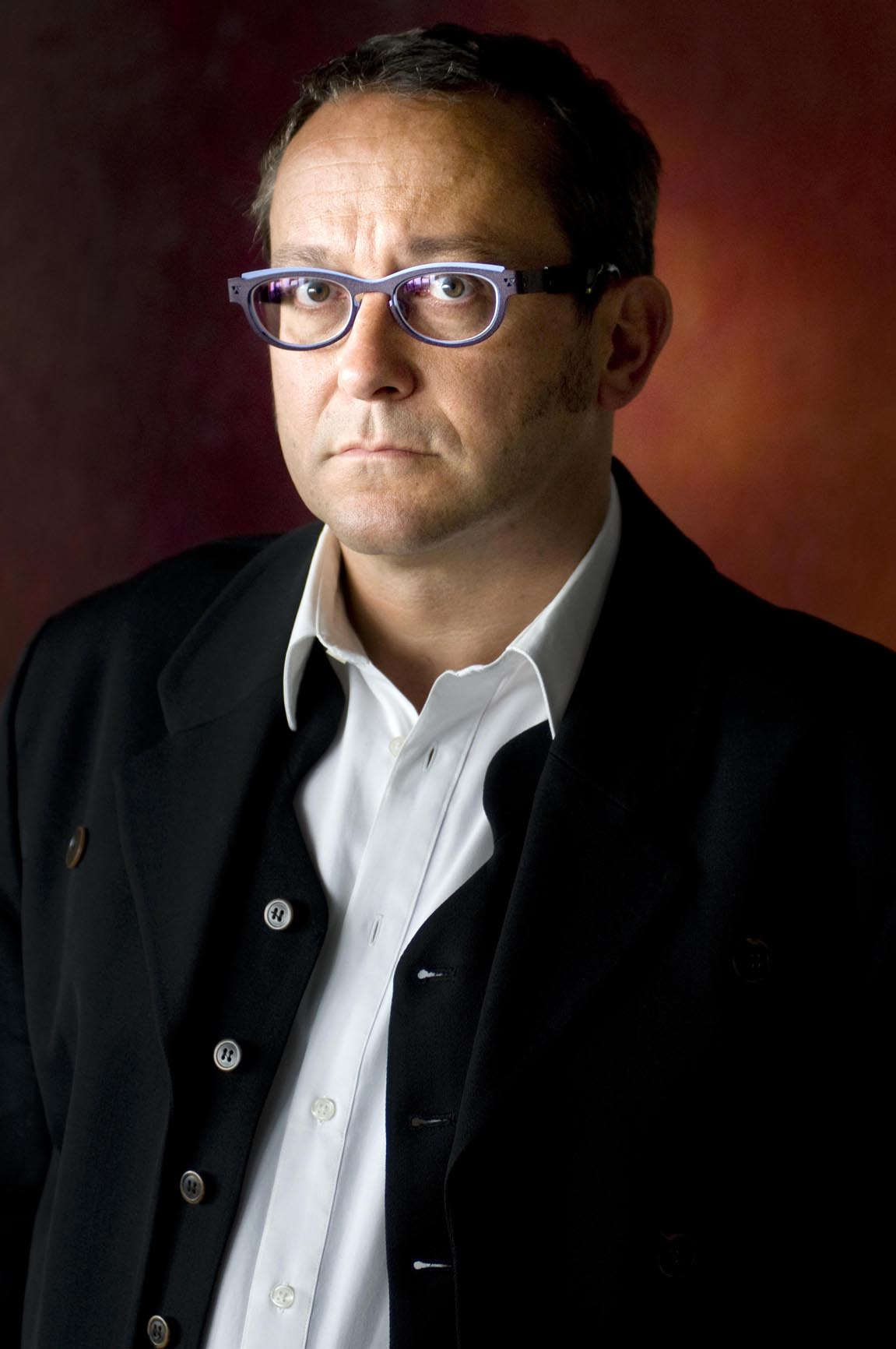
  - Tom Lanoye
    Audience Award: Tom Lanoye - Zwarte Tranen
- 2001
  - Literature Prize: Jeroen Brouwers - Geheime kamers
  - Youth Literature Prize: Bart Moeyaert, Gerda Dendooven and Filip Bral - Luna van de boom
  - Audience Award: Jeroen Brouwers - Geheime kamers
- 2002
  - Literature Prize: Arnon Grunberg - De Mensheid Zij Geprezen
  - Youth Literature Prize: Bas Haring - Kaas & de evolutietheorie
  - Audience Award: Peter Verhelst - Memoires van een Luipaard
- 2003
  - Literature Prize: Tom Lanoye - Boze Tongen
  - Youth Literature Prize: Floortje Zwigtman - Wolfsroedel
  - Audience Award: Tom Lanoye - Boze Tongen
- 2004
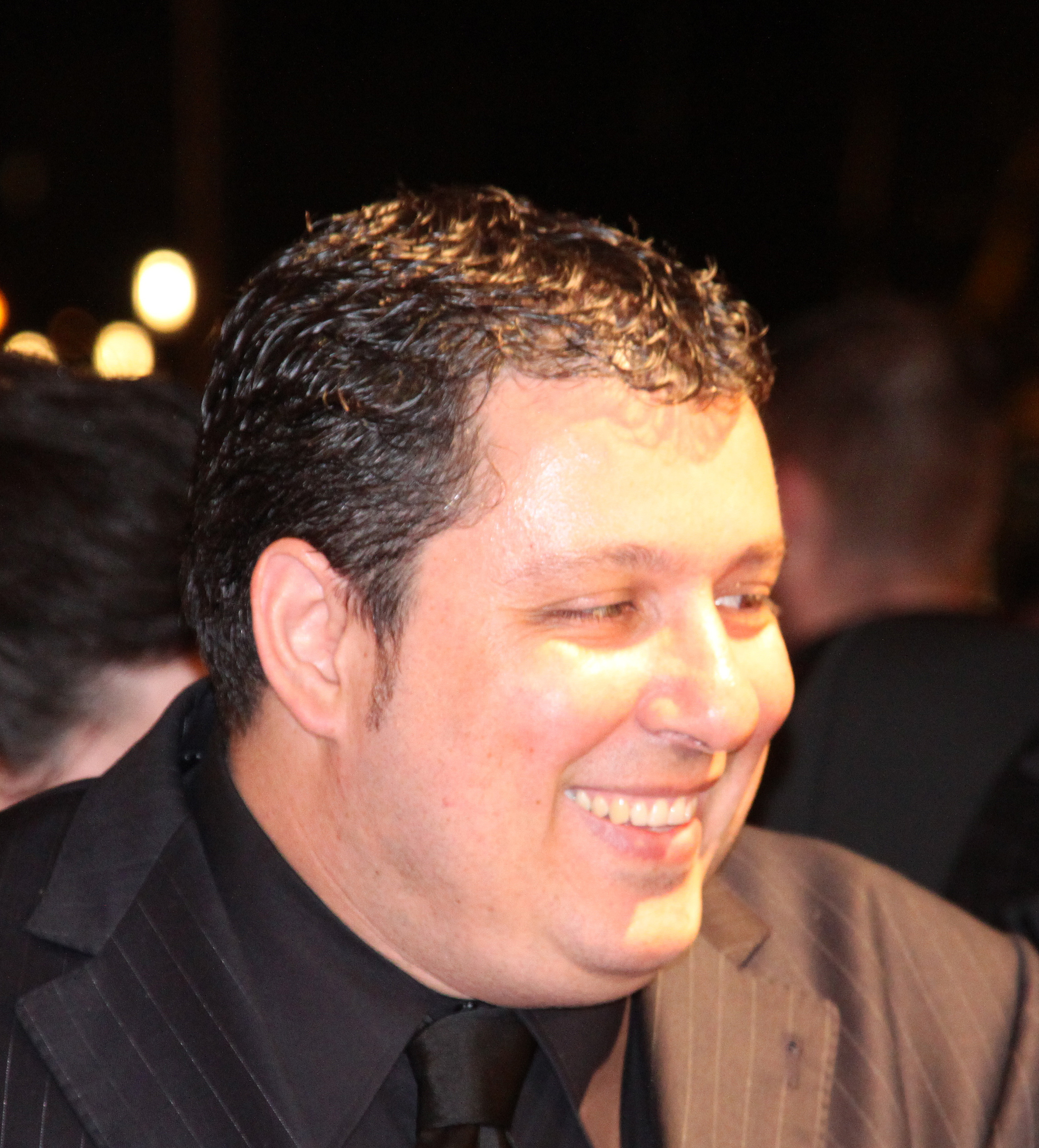
  Robert Vuijsje
  - Literature Prize: Hafid Bouazza - Paravion
  - Youth Literature Prize: Martha Heesen - Toen Faas niet thuiskwam
  - Audience Award: Chris De Stoop - Zij kwamen uit het Oosten
- 2005
  - Literature Prize: Frank Westerman - El Negro en ik
  - Youth Literature Prize: Guus Kuijer - Het boek van alle dingen
  - Audience Award: Patricia De Martelaere - Het onverwachte antwoord
- 2006
  - Literature Prize: Henk van Woerden - Ultramarijn
  - Youth Literature Prize: Floortje Zwigtman - Schijnbewegingen
  - Audience Award: Stefan Brijs - De engelenmaker
- 2007
  - Literature Prize: Arnon Grunberg - Tirza
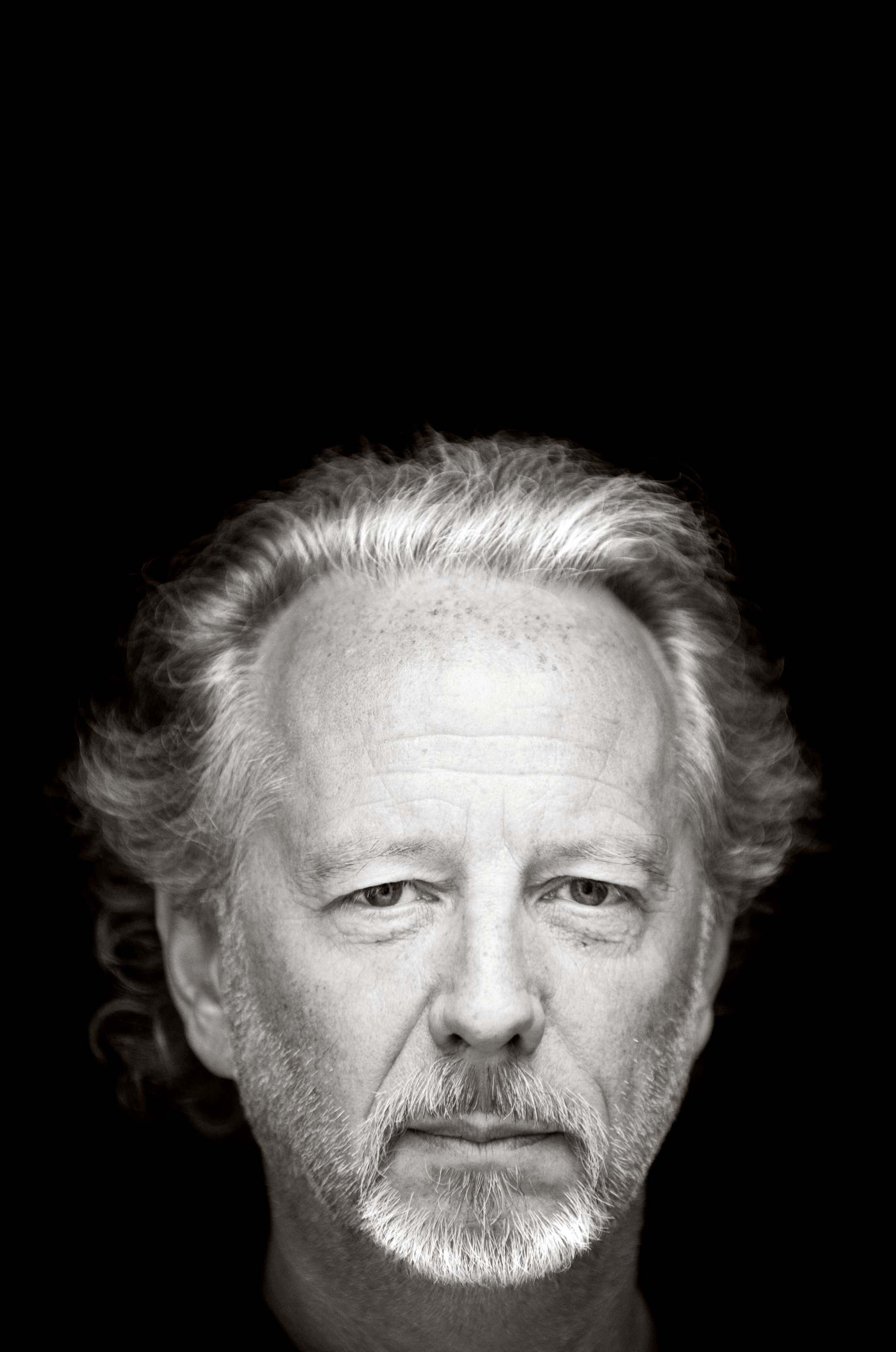
  - Stefan Hertmans
    Youth Literature Prize: Marjolijn Hof - Een kleine kans
  - Audience Award: Dimitri Verhulst - De helaasheid der dingen
- 2008
  - Literature Prize: Marc Reugebrink - Het Grote Uitstel
  - Youth Literature Prize: Sabien Clement, Mieke Versyp and Pieter Gaudesaboos - Linus
  - Audience Award: Jeroen Brouwers - Datumloze dagen
- 2009
  - Literature Prize: Robert Vuijsje - Alleen maar nette mensen
  - Youth Literature Prize: Peter Verhelst - Het geheim van de keel van de nachtegaal (ill. Carll Cneut)
  - Audience Award: Pia de Jong - Lange dagen
  - Audience Youth Award: Els Beerten- Allemaal willen we de hemel
- 2010
  - Literature Prize: Cees Nooteboom - 's Nachts komen de vossen
  - Youth Literature Prize: Ditte Merle - Wild Verliefd
  - Audience Award: Tom Lanoye - Sprakeloos
  - Audience Youth Award: Marita de Sterck- De hondeneters
- 2011
  - no awards ceremony.
- 2012 now renamed as 'De Gouden Boekenuil'
  - Literature Prize: David Pefko - Het voorseizoen
  - Audience Award: Stephan Enter - Grip
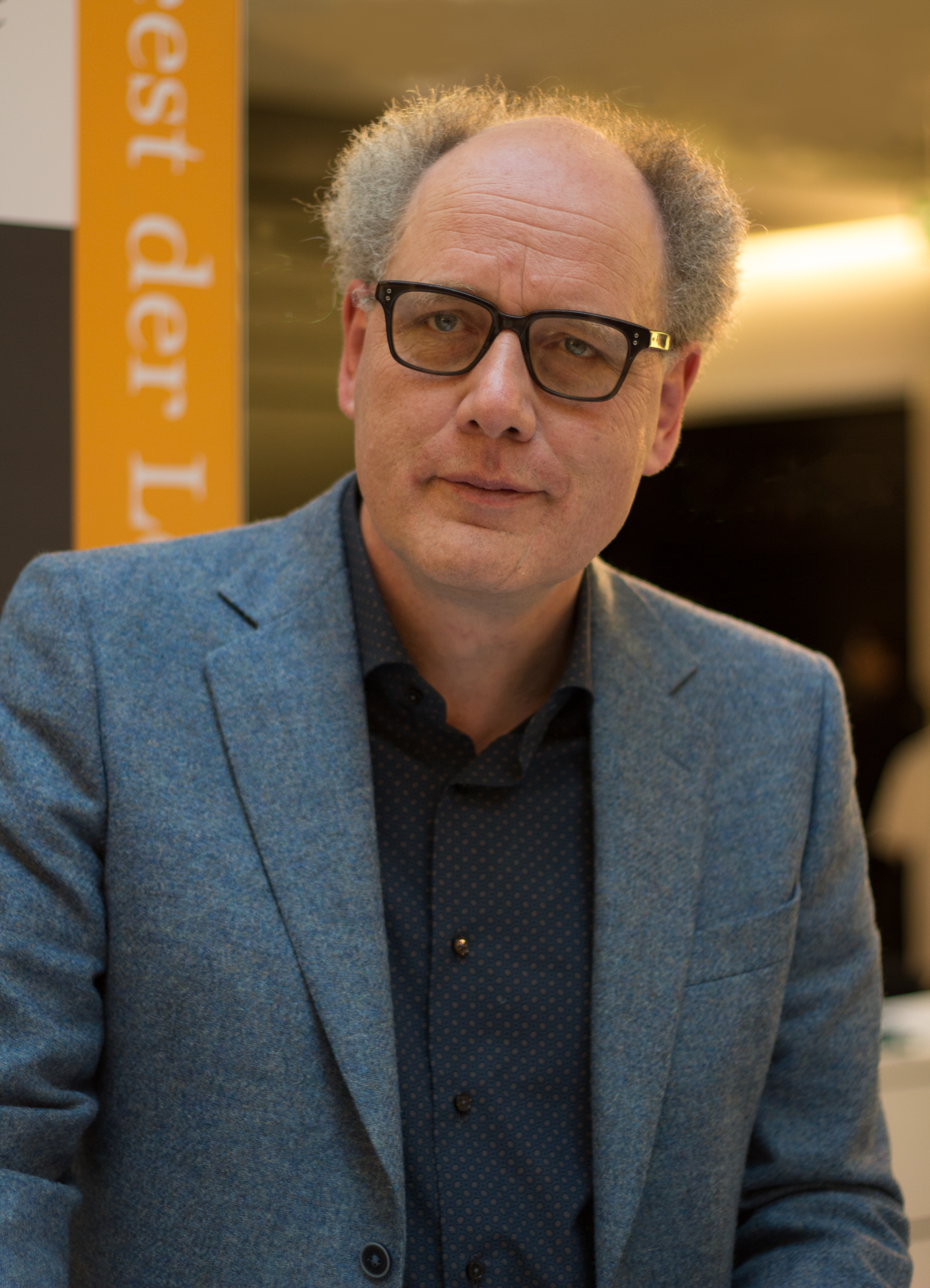
- P.F. Thomése
  2013
  - Literature Prize: Oek de Jong - Pier en oceaan
  - Audience Award: Tommy Wieringa - Dit zijn de namen
- 2014
  - Literature Prize: Joost de Vries - De republiek
  - Audience Award: Stefan Hertmans - Oorlog en terpentijn
- 2015
  - Literature Prize: Mark Schaevers – Orgelman
  - Audience Award: Niña Weijers – De consequenties
- 2016
  - Fintro Literature Prize: Hagar Peeters – Malva
  - Audience Award: P.F. Thomése – De onderwaterzwemmer
- 2017
  - Fintro Literature Prize: Jeroen Olyslaegers – Wil
  - Audience Award: Jeroen Olyslaegers – Wil
