= Bart Moeyaert =

Belgian writer (born 1964)

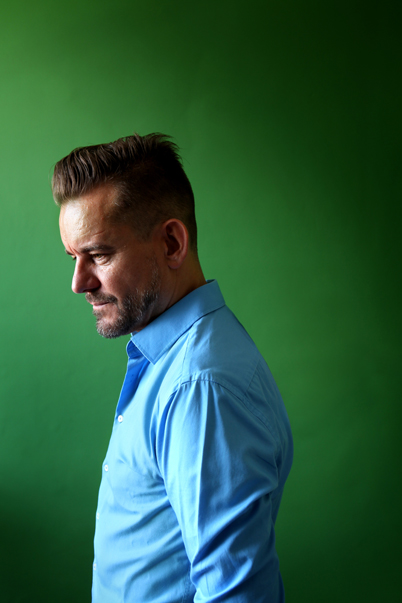
- Born: Bart Peter Boudewijn Moeyaert; 9 June 1964 (age 62); Bruges, Belgium
- Occupation: Writer
- Writing career
- Language: Dutch

Bart Peter Boudewijn Moeyaert (born 9 June 1964) is a Belgian writer.

== Early life ==
Moeyaert was born in 1964 in Bruges as the youngest of seven brothers. He is named after the character Bartje in the book series by Anne de Vries and after Baudouin of Belgium (Boudewijn). As is tradition in Belgium, King Baudouin of Belgium is his godfather as Moeyaert is the seventh son in an unbroken succession of sons.

== Career ==
=== Writing ===
Moeyaert made his debut in 1983 with the book Duet met valse noten. Moeyaert received the Prijs van de Kinder- en Jeugdjury voor het boek in Vlaanderen award for this book in 1984. In 1989, he published the book Suzanne Dantine which he considers to be his real debut with him transitioning from writer to author. Moeyaert later reworked the story into a new book Wespennest (1997).

In 1992, he won the Boekenleeuw award for his book Kus me and in 1993 he won the Prijs van de Provincie Antwerpen and the Prijs van de Provincie West-Vlaanderen awards for this book.

In 1995, he published the book Blote handen; he received numerous awards for this book in the following years, including the Boekenleeuw (1996), the Zilveren Griffel (1996), Prijs van de Vlaamse Gemeenschap voor Jeugdliteratuur (1998), Deutscher Jugendliteraturpreis (1998), Norske Oversetterpremien (1998), Vlaamse Cultuurprijs voor Jeugdliteratuur (1998) and the Interprovinciale Prijs Letterkunde (1999).

In 2013, he won the Prijs Letterkunde van de Provincie West-Vlaanderen together with Gerda Dendooven and Sabine Clement.

Moeyaert's work has been translated into numerous languages. His works range from picture books and YA literature to essays. Bart has also written screenplays for television and movies as well as poetry, song lyrics, and plays professionally.

=== Children's literature ===
In 2001 he was awarded the Woutertje Pieterse Prijs for his book Broere. The book is a collection of short stories about himself, his brothers, his parents and his childhood. The jury praised Moeyaert for combining autobiographical elements with childhood reflections and a dose of irony. The first edition of the book consisted of 31 stories; this grew to 42 stories in the second edition (2002) and to 49 stories in the third edition (2017).

In 2001, he also won the Gouden Uil for the book Luna van de boom with Gerda Dendooven and Filip Bral.

In 2006, he won the 2005 Nienke van Hichtum-prijs for his book Dani Bennoni.

In 2019, he won the Astrid Lindgren Memorial Award. The jury praised Moeyaert for his "compressed and musical literary language" as well as his ability to "put complex relationships under the loupe" without "drawing easy lines between good and evil".

In 2019, he also won the Zilveren Griffel award for the book Tegenwoordig heet iedereen Sorry.

In 2020, he was on the shortlist for the Hans Christian Andersen Award for the third time but he did not win the award.

=== Poetry ===
In 2003, he made his debut as poet with Verzamel de liefde.

On 26 January 2006 (Gedichtendag 2006) he became the poet of the city of Antwerp for a period of two years. He wrote 18 poems related to life in the city of Antwerp and they were published in his second collection of poems Gedichten voor gelukkige mensen. Some of these poems are also on public display, including in the Permeke Library and the Vlaamse Opera. In 2009, he was nominated for the J.C. Bloem-poëzieprijs for this work.
