= Theater Na de Dam =

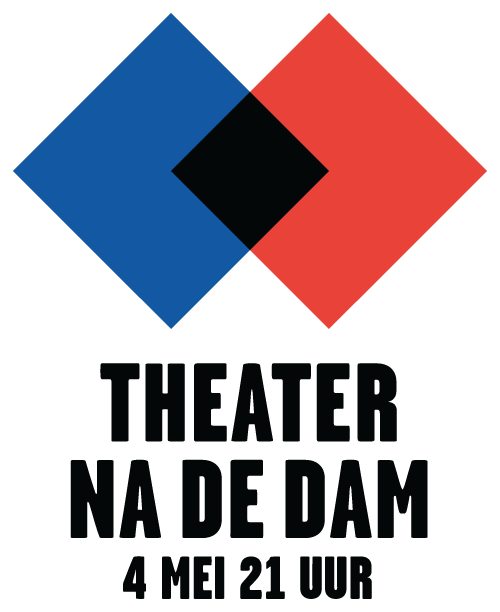
- Logo Theater Na de Dam, 2016
- Status: Active
- Genre: Theatre, music, and visual arts
- Date: 4 May
- Frequency: Annually
- Location: Netherlands
- Website: www.theaternadedam.nl

Theater Na de Dam is an annual theatre manifestation in the Netherlands. It takes place on the night of the Remembrance of the Dead memorial service that takes place May 4, on Dam Square. In over eighty different theatres throughout the Netherlands, theatre performances with a substantive link to the Second World War are being performed simultaneously.

== Founding and theme ==
In 2010, well known Dutch theatre makers Jaïr Stranders and Bo Tarenskeen worried about the decreasing eloquence of the Remembrance of the Dead memorial service. According to them, the distance between the current generations and the Second World War was not only increasing, they also felt that the character of the annual ceremony had become too general and abstract. They felt that it threatened to make it impossible to properly reflect on the specific history of the Second World War.

By programming and producing multiple different performances that relate to the Second World War in a personal and contemporary manner, the initiative strives to make its audience reflect critically on the events during that time and how it still influences the world of today. It strives to ask the question if it is possible to learn from history.

The first edition took place in 2010, when seven performances in and around de Nes (the theatre district of Amsterdam) took place. Since then, the initiative has grown immensely and currently offers over eighty performances around the Netherlands. Ensembles, theatre makers, and artists that have contributed to the program so far are among others Toneelgroep Amsterdam, Het Nationale Toneel, Wende, Typhoon, Huub van der Lubbe, Jenny Arean, Toneelgroep Maastricht, Theater Utrecht, the Ro Theater, Rik van den Bos, De Theatertroep, Hadewych Minis, Freek de Jonge, Jan Jaap van der Wal, Lucretia van der Vloot and Het Toneelhuis.
