= List of The Musketeers episodes =

The Musketeers is a BBC television historical action drama that is based on the characters of Alexandre Dumas's novel The Three Musketeers. The series stars Tom Burke as Athos, Santiago Cabrera as Aramis, Howard Charles as Porthos and Luke Pasqualino as D'Artagnan. The Musketeers was commissioned on 3 May 2012, premiered on 19 January 2014 and concluded on 1 August 2016. During the course of the programme, 30 episodes of The Musketeers aired over three series.

== Series overview ==
These are the premiere and finale dates for the show airing on BBC One, its origin channel. Series 2 concluded earlier in the US, and Series 3 was aired/released before the UK in multiple countries; see the episode tables and broadcast details for these dates.

Series	Episodes	Originally released	
Series	Episodes	First released	Last released
1	10	19 January 2014	30 March 2014
2	10	2 January 2015	27 March 2015
3	10	28 May 2016	1 August 2016

== Episodes ==
=== Series 1 (2014) ===
No. overall	No. in series	Title	Directed by	Written by	Original release date	UK viewers (millions)
1	1	"Friends and Enemies"	Toby Haynes	Adrian Hodges	19 January 2014	9.28
Young swordsman D'Artagnan and his father Alexandre are on their way to Paris to petition the King when they're attacked at an inn; Alexandre is killed by a man claiming to be "Athos of the Musketeers." Seeking revenge, D'Artagnan heads to Paris to confront and kill Athos. Meanwhile, Athos, Porthos, and Aramis are ordered by Treville to track down a missing contingent of the Musketeers. Upon their return, Athos is confronted by D'Artagnan, before being arrested for murder. The King orders Athos' execution. To prove Athos' innocence Porthos and Aramis enlist the aid of D'Artagnan in recovering letters stolen from the King's messengers by the Red Guard claiming to be Athos. D'Artagnan accompanies them to discover the truth.
2	2	"Sleight of Hand"	Toby Haynes	Adrian Hodges	26 January 2014	7.58
The Musketeers engineer D'Artagnan's imprisonment in a cell alongside Vadim (Jason Flemyng), a notorious criminal who uses the Queen's visit to escape. Vadim plans to bring about a people's revolution by killing the King and Queen. But Vadim is a master of sleight of hand, and his plans are more criminal than political.
3	3	"Commodities"	Saul Metzstein	Susie Conklin	2 February 2014	6.77
The three Musketeers are sent to Le Havre to arrest the flamboyant merchant trader/explorer, Emile Bonnaire (James Callis), who is to appear before the King for breaking a trade treaty between France and Spain. The journey to Paris is fraught with danger from Bonnaire's friends and enemies. Porthos is badly wounded in an ambush. Taking refuge in Athos' derelict family chateau brings back memories to Athos of his brother and of Milady de Winter. Porthos is angry when he discovers the commodity, enslaved people, that Bonnaire trades in.
4	4	"The Good Soldier"	Richard Clark	Adrian Hodges	9 February 2014	6.14
Aramis's old friend Marsac (JJ Feild), a former Musketeer, returns to Paris to kill the Duke of Savoy (Vincent Regan) whom he holds responsible for the deaths of 20 Musketeers. The Musketeers capture Marsac, and he seeks their help to discover the truth that implicates Treville in the massacre. They're also charged with protecting the ruthless Duke in Paris to sign a treaty with the King.
5	5	"The Homecoming"	Saul Metzstein	James Dormer	23 February 2014	5.91
Porthos wakes from a drunken stupor beside the body of a dead man. Captured by the Red Guard, he is judged and sentenced to death for murder. Before the sentence is carried out, he is rescued by thieves and taken to the Court of Miracles, a slum of thieves, beggars, and whores run by Charon (Ashley Walters), where the orphan Porthos grew up. Athos, Aramis, and D'Artagnan, unable to enter the Court of Miracles to follow him, investigate from the outside to discover the truth.
6	6	"The Exiles"	Andy Hay	Ben Harris	2 March 2014	5.62
King Louis's treacherous mother, the exiled Marie de' Medici (Tara Fitzgerald), returns to seek protection from an assassin. Aramis and D'Artagnan, sent to collect a young woman, Agnes (Amy Nuttall), and her infant son are stunned when armed men abduct the baby, and the Musketeers seek to find him and uncover whom they were sent to escort.
7	7	"A Rebellious Woman"	Richard Clark	James Payne	9 March 2014	5.69
A young girl is killed trying to deliver a petition to the Queen as the royal coach passes. The petition was from wealthy noblewoman Comtesse Ninon De Larroque (Annabelle Wallis) pleading for women's education and rights. The Cardinal receives an offer from the Catholic Church if he can convict the Comtesse of witchcraft. When the Comtesse is arrested and taken to a convent for trial, Milady's testimony guarantees conviction. When the Cardinal is mysteriously poisoned, the Musketeers must find the culprit before the Comtesse is burned at the stake.
8	8	"The Challenge"	Farren Blackburn	Susie Conklin	16 March 2014	5.45
The prisoner Labarge (Vinnie Jones) the Musketeers were escorting kills the captain of the Cardinal's Red Guards, and the animosity between the Musketeers and the Red Guard leads to the King ordering a challenge between the best fighter from the Musketeers and the Red Guards. Captain Treville arranges a contest between Musketeers and chooses himself when he learns the Cardinal has enlisted Labarge into the Red Guards.
9	9	"Knight Takes Queen"	Andy Hay	Peter McKenna	23 March 2014	5.25
The King is disillusioned with the Queen's inability to have children and covets Charlotte Mellendorf (Charlotte Hope) as a possible new Queen. Under Musketeer's protection, the Queen, at a forest pool known for its powers of fertility, escapes an assassination attempt. With Aramis and Athos, they flee to a convent pursued by the attackers who lay siege to the convent. They defend the convent with the nuns' help while D'Artagnan and Porthos return to Paris for help and discover who is paying the attackers.
10	10	"Musketeers Don't Die Easily"	Farren Blackburn	Adrian Hodges	30 March 2014	5.27
A drunken Athos takes his estranged wife Milady hostage in the town square; the fact that D'Artagnan knows her causes a rift between the Musketeers. This gives the Cardinal and Milady the belief that they can wreak their revenge against the King's soldiers. Milady returns to the slums to employ Sarazin (Sean Pertwee) to kill the Musketeers, putting Constance's life in danger. The full extent of the Cardinal's treason against the Queen is revealed, but her response is surprising.

=== Series 2 (2015) ===
No. overall	No. in series	Title	Directed by	Written by	Original release date	UK viewers (millions)
11	1	"Keep Your Friends Close"	John Strickland	Adrian Hodges	2 January 2015	4.93
The Musketeers rescue the Comte de Rochefort from hanging. The deceased Cardinal's man in Madrid who had seemingly escaped from a Spanish prison has news that General De Foix, France's chief military strategist, has been captured. The King orders his rescue by Rochefort and the Musketeers, but the duplicitous Rochefort has plans to rescue De Foix, involving the death of the Musketeers. The Dauphin Louis is born.
12	2	"An Ordinary Man"	John Strickland	Peter McKenna	9 January 2015	4.78
King Louis wants to experience the life of an ordinary Frenchman and insists the Musketeers take him onto the streets in disguise. In a tavern, the King and D'Artagnan are separated from the other Musketeers and fall into the hands of slave traders intent on selling them as galley enslaved people on a Spanish ship. Their paths cross with Milady de Winter, who works for the slavers. Rochefort sees a chance to manipulate the Queen in the interests of Spain.
13	3	"The Good Traitor"	Marc Jobst	Lucy Catherine and Adrian Hodges	16 January 2015	N/A
An ex-general, a traitor of the Spanish army, arrives in Paris to plead for help rescuing his daughter, held by Spanish agents in Paris; in exchange for a coded formula and cipher machine and deadly new gunpowder, the Spanish also want. The Dauphin is seriously ill, and Constance takes the baby from the palace to save his life. The Queen informs the King of the prince's abduction, finding him under a table in a compromising position with Milady de Winter.
14	4	"Emilie"	Andy Hay	Ryan Craig and Adrian Hodges	30 January 2015	N/A
A prophet, Emilie of Duras, is raising an army from the peasantry of France to march on Spain. Aramis rides to her camp to resolve the situation, and while there, Queen Anne and Constance arrive, and the reasons for Emilie's visions become apparent. Rochefort and the Spanish Ambassador's double dealings come to a head with the death of Rochefort's whore; and then of the ambassador at Milady's hand, with Treville paying the price for failing to protect the ambassador.
15	5	"The Return"	Marc Jobst	Simon J. Ashford	13 February 2015	N/A
Athos is kidnapped by his tenants and discovers his neighbor, Baron Renard, intends to take his lands. Athos's indifference to his tenants, because his wife Milady had killed his brother at the family home, shocks the other Musketeers, but a meeting with his dead brother's betrothed changes his mind, and he agrees to give the tenants the land if they are prepared to fight for it; requiring the Musketeers to train them.
16	6	"Through a Glass Darkly"	Andy Hay	Marnie Dickens & Adrian Hodges	20 February 2015	N/A
An astrologer invites the Royal party to observe a solar eclipse at his castle observatory and takes them all prisoner with D'Artagnan, Aramis, and Porthos, to take part in his deadly game of chance. Milady takes the toss of a coin to decide her fate and is allowed to live. The King has to make the same choice if his Queen and son are to survive, while the Musketeers seek a way to escape from a madman bent on revenge.
17	7	"A Marriage of Inconvenience"	Edward Bennett	Steve Bailie	27 February 2015	N/A
A marriage between Princess Louise, a cousin of King Louis, and a Swedish crown prince that would bring an alliance between France and Sweden to the detriment of Spain; allows Rochefort to plot his advancement at court having the King's council members killed by unlikely assassins with a disastrous consequence for Constance's husband. Rochefort learns of the Queen's relationship with Aramis, and Milady discovers where Rochefort's loyalties lie.
18	8	"The Prodigal Father"	Edward Bennett	Susie Conklin & Adrian Hodges	6 March 2015	4.05
Treville tells Porthos who his father is, and Porthos travels to meet his father, half-sister, and her husband he never knew. Porthos's loyalties to his father and the Musketeers are tested when the Musketeers discover his sister and murderous brother-in-law are pimping young girls as entertainment to the highest bidder. Constance has to decide about her future with D'Artagnan after doctor Lemay proposes. Rochefort manipulates King Louis's paranoia to take control of the court, and his lust for the Queen comes to a confrontation with Anne and ends with his accusation of her treason.
19	9	"The Accused"	Nicholas Renton	Simon J. Ashford	14 March 2015 (US); 20 March 2015 (UK)	N/A
Rochefort produces a treasonable letter the Queen wrote to her brother, the King of Spain. With unexpected help from Milady, the Musketeers spirit the Queen away to safety at a convent, leaving Athos and Milady to search for evidence that Rochefort is a spy for the Spanish. The King is poisoned, doctor Lemay is arrested, and Constance is implicated. Constance is given a graphic ultimatum of her fate unless she testifies to the Queen's infidelity with Aramis. Porthos sets out to capture Vargas, the Spanish spymaster, while the Queen insists on returning to Paris and falls into Rochefort's trap that includes the arrest of Aramis for treason.
20	10	"Trial and Punishment"	Nicholas Renton	Simon Allen	21 March 2015 (US); 27 March 2015 (UK)	4.18
Athos and D'Artagnan rescue Constance from the executioner's sword and help Porthos capture the Spanish spymaster Vargas with Treville. Rochefort proves his case against the Queen and Aramis with testimony from Lady Marguerite. Milady rescues Aramis; Rochefort clears the court except for the red guard, and the King signs the Queen's death warrant leading to a final confrontation between Rochefort and the Musketeers.

=== Series 3 (2016) ===
The third series premiered in Canada on Showcase Canada on 10 April 2016 The full series was made available on Netflix Latin America on 16 April 2016, and on Hulu in the United States on 14 May 2016. The series premiered in the UK on 28 May 2016.

No. overall	No. in series	Title	Directed by	Written by	Original Can. air date	Original UK air date	UK viewers (millions)
21	1	"Spoils of War"	Andy Hay	Simon J. Ashford	10 April 2016	28 May 2016	3.68
Athos, Porthos, and D'Artagnan fight on the battlefront, while Aramis has trouble adapting to a monk's quiet, contemplative life. The Musketeers' search for missing gunpowder leads them to follow bandits to Aramis' monastery, where circumstances force them to collaborate to save the monastery's children and brothers. Aramis finally accepts his true calling as a Musketeer and rejoins his brothers-in-arms in Paris.
22	2	"The Hunger"	Andy Hay	Simon J. Ashford	17 April 2016	11 June 2016	3.57
The corrupt Governor of Paris conspires with the Duke de Beaufort, the primary food provider for Paris, to stage a robbery of the city's granary and pin it on the refugees, only to later sell the stolen grain back to the King at an inflated price. D'Artagnan is taken captive along with the rioting refugees; the other Musketeers and Constance must rescue them from the hands of the Red Guard before they are executed.
23	3	"Brothers in Arms"	Roger Goldby	Simon Allen	24 April 2016	20 June 2016	N/A
King Louis tasks the Musketeers by bringing his exiled brother, the Duke of Orléans, back to Paris to mend bridges. On the way, the Duke is robbed of dangerous letters which could destroy Orléans. The Duke informs the corrupt Governor, and the Governor's Red Guard must race the Musketeers in the hunt for the thief.
24	4	"The Queen's Diamonds"	Nicholas Renton	Jeff Povey	1 May 2016	25 June 2016	N/A
King Louis' sister, Queen of England Henrietta Maria, is robbed of invaluable crown jewels (destined to be sold to finance England's armed forces) while on her way to Paris to ask her brother for assistance in the upcoming war. The Musketeers quickly discover the thief to be Émile Bonnaire, a flamboyant but pathetic criminal with whom they have a history. Athos, Porthos, and D'Artagnan pressure Bonnaire into leading them to the diamonds' buyers. Meanwhile, Aramis reconnects with Pauline, a childhood friend who grew up in a brothel where their mothers lived and worked. She is set to marry a French nobleman but is being blackmailed by someone threatening to reveal the circumstances of her childhood, and Aramis tries to resolve the situation peacefully.
25	5	"To Play the King"	Roger Goldby	Ellen Taylor	8 May 2016	3 July 2016	N/A
Feron and Marcheaux engineer a prison break at the Chatelet to give Lucien the time to break in and steal Louis' gold reserves. Meanwhile, one of the prisoners is a deranged man who believes he is Louis when the King is fully engaged in his son's birthday.
26	6	"Death of a Hero"	Nicholas Renton	Peter McKenna	15 May 2016	9 July 2016	3.69
Feron intends to murder the Musketeers, but Athos escapes and survives an attempt on his life by Grimaud that also springs Gaston from jail. The King asks Aramis to accompany him on a pilgrimage to his father's grave and confronts him about his affair with Anne. The King grants Feron the regency of his son; Feron repents and dies, warning the King of assault by Grimaud. Porthos and D'Artagnan are rescued and defeat Grimaud's forces together. However, Grimaud escapes with Gaston, whom he intends to crown King, because he believes Louis is terminally ill.
27	7	"Fool's Gold"	Sue Tully	Kelly Jones	22 May 2016	16 July 2016	3.81
The Musketeers pursue Grimaud, and the trail leads them to a camp filled with women trying to make a life for themselves while their men are at war, led by Juliette. When other attackers lay siege to the village, the Musketeers defeat them while Athos discovers a link between one of the women and Grimaud. Porthos befriends a pregnant woman named Elodie and assists in delivering her child, a girl. Meanwhile, in Paris, following Feron's death, Louis considers forgiving Anne for her affair with Aramis.
28	8	"Prisoners of War"	Udayan Prasad	James Payne	29 May 2016	23 July 2016	3.47
The King is dying, and the Queen asks Aramis to help her to negotiate a peace treaty with her brother, The Spanish King. Grimaud and Gaston capture Aramis. An injunction is sent to the Queen with a request to exchange captured Spanish soldiers for Aramis, intending to discredit Anne in front of the people and the King. The unpopular decision releases the prisoners, and Aramis is freed, but Grimaud escapes again. Treville deals with Milady, who has returned from England, and D'Artagnan discovers his cousin Espoir is in Paris.
29	9	"The Prize"	Sue Tully	Dusty Hughes	5 June 2016	30 July 2016	3.86
When the King dies, the regent Treville sends the Dauphin into hiding with Constance to protect him from Gaston and Lorraine. To avoid bloodshed, Gaston is pardoned by the Queen; however, he is not satisfied, and Treville is the only one that can negotiate a treaty unless the King's enemies find the boy first. Ultimately, Lorraine agrees to a pact with the regent leading to Gaston's arrest. The Musketeers foil Grimaud's attempt to kidnap the Dauphin, but at the cost of Treville's life. Sylvie confides in Constance that she is pregnant with Athos's child.
30	10	"We Are the Garrison"	Udayan Prasad	Simon Allen	12 June 2016	1 August 2016	3.59
Following Treville's funeral, the Musketeers survive Grimaud's attempt on their lives when the garrison is blown up, but part of the gunpowder and the weapons are stolen. Though, Constance was in the Garrison during the explosion, she and Brujon survive due to Brujon's quick thinking, using the cellar door as a shield when the roof collapsed. Grimaud lures the Musketeers into a trap by taking hostages, including Sylvie, Athos' love interest, but they rescue them. During the rescue, Athos learns about Sylvie's pregnancy and is overjoyed. The mortally wounded Grimaud escapes, but the Musketeers stop him from destroying the cathedral with the stolen gunpowder and defeat him after a brutal fight. The Queen and the Dauphin are restored to the throne, with Milady as the royal spymaster, and her first task is the elimination of Gaston. Athos steps down as Captain and leaves Paris with Sylvie to begin a new life with their child. D'Artagnan succeeds Athos as Captain and begins rebuilding the garrison with Constance. Porthos is named General du Vallon and asks Elodie to marry him before leaving for the front lines. Brujon is made a full-fledged Musketeer and leaves with Porthos. Aramis becomes the new Minister, allowing him to oversee raising his son with Anne and they resume their relationship. The series ends with the main characters enjoying their new positions in life and finishing with an outside view of the city.
