= Adrian Hodges =

English TV and film writer (born 1957)

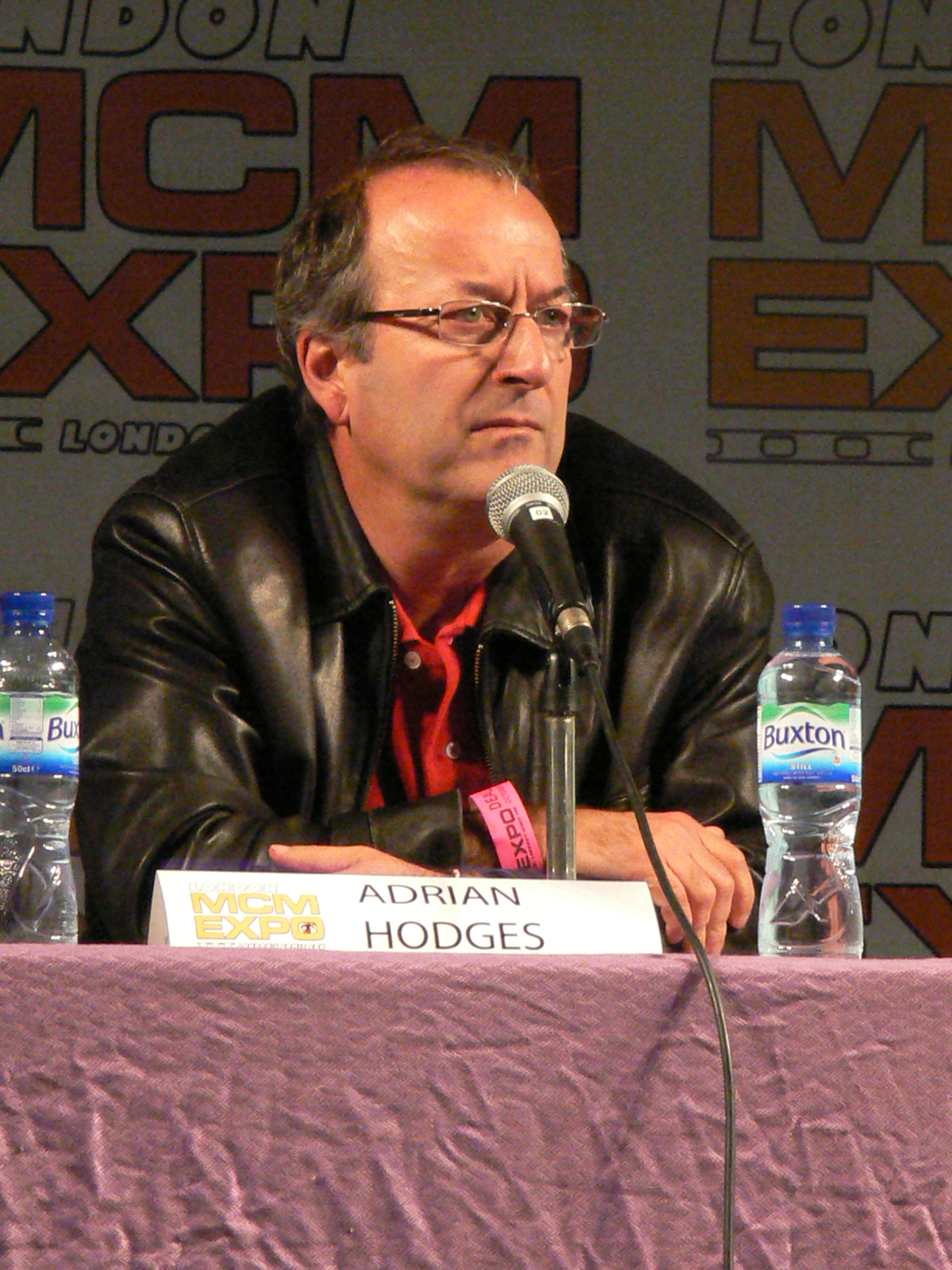
- Born: 4 February 1957 (age 69); London, England
- Occupations: Screenwriter, writer, producer
- Known for: Survivors (2008), BBC1. An updated version of the 1970s drama series set in a post-apocalyptic Britain.

Adrian Hodges (born 4 February 1957) is an English television and film writer. He has won a BAFTA Award.

== Life and career ==
He began his career in journalism for Screen International magazine and his screenwriting debut was the 1991 television drama Tell Me That You Love Me, followed by screenplays for The Bridge (1992) and Tom & Viv (1994) for which Miranda Richardson and Rosemary Harris both received Oscar nominations.

After his film adaptation of Julian Barnes's Metroland (1997) Hodges concentrated on writing for television, including Amongst Women (1998), his adaptation of John McGahern's novel for BBC Two, which received a BAFTA award for Best Serial and won the Grand Prix award at the Banff Television Festival, The Lost World (2001) and Charles II: The Power and The Passion (2003).

In 2005 he wrote the episode "Triumph" for the HBO-BBC series Rome. He has since adapted two of Philip Pullman's Sally Lockhart stories for TV: The Ruby in the Smoke (2006) and The Shadow in the North (production completed 2007).

He is co-creator of the ITV sci-fi drama Primeval, for which he wrote nine episodes in five series. In 2008 he was also reported to be working on and a new adaptation of Silas Marner.

On 22 November 2007, the BBC announced that they were going to remake Survivors, as written by Adrian Hodges. Two series were shown on BBC One, in 2008 and 2010.

Hodges wrote the screenplay for the 2011 film My Week with Marilyn.

Adrian Hodges created the BBC television series The Musketeers, based on the Alexandre Dumas characters, which aired its first season from January to March 2014.

== Writing credits ==
| Production | Notes | Broadcaster |
|---|---|---|
| Screen One | "Tell Me That You Love Me" (1991) | BBC One |
| The Bridge | Feature film (1992) | N/A |
| Tom & Viv | Feature film (1994) | N/A |
| Kavanagh QC | "A Family Affair" (1995); "The Sweetest Thing" (1995); "True Commitment" (1996) | ITV |
| Metroland | Feature film (1997) | N/A |
| Heaven on Earth | Television film (1998) | BBC One |
| Amongst Women | Television miniseries (1998) | BBC Two |
| The Jump | 4 episodes (1998) | ITV |
| David Copperfield | Television miniseries (1999) | BBC One |
| Lorna Doone | Television film (2000) | BBC One |
| The Hunt | Television film (2001) | ITV |
| The Lost World | Television film (2001) | BBC One |
| Charles II: The Power and The Passion | Television miniseries (2003) | BBC One |
| Rome | "Triumph" (2005) | BBC Two; HBO |
| The Ruby in the Smoke | Television film (2006) | BBC One |
| The History of Mr. Polly | Television film (2007) | ITV |
| The Shadow in the North | Television film (2007) | BBC One |
| Survivors | 12 episodes (2008–2010) | BBC One |
| Primeval | 36 episodes (2007–2011) | ITV |
| My Week with Marilyn | Feature film (2011) | N/A |
| 13 Steps Down | Television miniseries (2012) | ITV |
| Labyrinth | Television miniseries (2012) | Channel 4 The CW |
| Primeval: New World | 13 episodes (2012–2013) | Space |
| The Musketeers | 30 episodes (2014–16) | BBC One |
| The Go-Between | Television film (also executive producer, 2015) | BBC One |

== Awards and nominations ==
| Year | Award | Work | Category | Result | Reference |
|---|---|---|---|---|---|
| 1999 | British Academy Television Awards | Amongst Women (shared with Colin Tucker, Jonathan Curling, and Tom Cairns) | Best Drama Serial | Nominated | |
| 2004 | British Academy Television Awards | Charles II: The Power and The Passion (shared with Kate Harwood and Joe Wright) | Best Drama Serial | Won | |
| 2006 | Writers Guild of America Award | Rome | New Series (TV) (with Alexandra Cunningham, David Frankel, Bruno Heller, William J. Macdonald, and John Milius) | Nominated | |
| 2007 | TV Quick Awards | Primeval (shared with Tim Haines) | Best New Drama | Nominated | |
| 2012 | British Academy Television Awards | My Week with Marilyn (shared with Simon Curtis, David Parfitt, and Harvey Weinstein) | Alexander Korda Award for Best British Film | Nominated | |
