= David Harewood =

British actor and presenter (born 1965)

David Harewood OBE
- Harewood in 2026
- Born: 8 December 1965 (age 60); Birmingham, England
- Education: Royal Academy of Dramatic Art
- Occupations: Actor; presenter
- Years active: 1990–present
- Spouse: Kirsty Handy (m. 2014)
- Children: 2

President of Royal Academy of Dramatic Art
- Incumbent
- Assumed office 2024
- Vice President: Cynthia Erivo
- Principal: Niamh Dowling
- Preceded by: Kenneth Branagh
- Harewood's voice recorded 2012, as part of an audio description of the Buxton Memorial Fountain for VocalEyes

David Michael Harewood OBE (born 8 December 1965) is an English actor and presenter who has served as president of the Royal Academy of Dramatic Art since February 2024. He is known for his television roles as David Estes in Homeland (2011–2012), J'onn J'onzz / Martian Manhunter and Hank Henshaw / Cyborg Superman in Supergirl (2015–2021). He has also appeared in films such as Blood Diamond, The Merchant of Venice, and Strings, whilst his video game roles include Usef Omar in Call of Duty: Infinite Warfare (2016) and Warlin Door in Alan Wake II (2023).

== Early life ==
David Michael Harewood was born in the Small Heath area of Birmingham, on 8 December 1965. He has one sister and two brothers. His parents were part of the Windrush generation and had moved to England from Barbados in the late 1950s and early 1960s. His mother worked as a caterer and his father was a lorry driver. Harewood attended St Benedict's Junior School and Washwood Heath Academy. He later joined London's National Youth Theatre. In his youth, he worked at a wine bar in Birmingham city centre. At the age of 18, he gained a place at the Royal Academy of Dramatic Art.

== Career ==
Harewood began acting in 1990 and has appeared in films such as The Hawk, Great Moments in Aviation, Harnessing Peacocks, Mad Dogs and Englishmen, Blood Diamond, The Merchant of Venice and Strings. He is known for his television appearances on Ballykissangel, The Vice and Fat Friends. He played Don Coleman in Hustle (Series 7 The Fall of Railton FC (2011)). In 1997, he was the first black actor to play Othello at the National Theatre in London.

In 2008, he played Major Simon Brooks in The Palace; he also appeared (that December) on Celebrity Mastermind, with specialist subject Philip Pullman's His Dark Materials. He appeared in the BBC film adaptation of the Philip Pullman novels The Ruby in the Smoke and The Shadow in the North, both of which are titles from the Sally Lockhart Mysteries.

In 2009, Harewood appeared in the BBC single drama Mrs Mandela, playing Nelson Mandela. He played Brother Tuck in the third series of Robin Hood. He appeared in the Doctor Who story "The End of Time". He played Martin Luther King Jr. in the premiere of The Mountaintop, written by American playwright Katori Hall, directed by James Dacre, which opened at Theatre503 in London on 9 June 2009.

Harewood next appeared in two episodes of Chris Ryan's Strike Back as Colonel Tshuma. From June to September 2010, he played Theseus in the premiere of Moira Buffini's play Welcome to Thebes at the National Theatre in London. He played Martin Viner in an episode of New Tricks. He narrated Welcome to Lagos, a BBC documentary about Lagos, Nigeria. He also starred in British independent film The Hot Potato, the film also starred Ray Winstone, Colm Meaney and Jack Huston. He played Frankenstein's monster in the TV live event Frankenstein's Wedding.

From 2011, Harewood starred as David Estes, the director of the CIA's Counterterrorism Center, in the Showtime series Homeland. After appearing in 24 episodes, his character was killed off in a bomb explosion at the end of season 2. Also in 2011, he voiced Captain Quinton Cole in the video game Battlefield 3.

In June 2014, he appeared in Tulip Fever. In October 2015, he appeared as a core cast member on the CBS television series Supergirl as Hank Henshaw. Since his character was revealed (in the episode "Human for a Day") to be J'onn J'onzz/Martian Manhunter posing as Henshaw, he portrays J'onn J'onzz with Henshaw's likeness as his human form and has a dual recurring role as the real Hank Henshaw / Cyborg Superman.

In 2017, Harewood was in London to attend the British Urban Film Festival. The following year, for his performance in "Free in Deed", Harewood won Best Actor at the 2018 British Urban Film Festival awards. Harewood was included in the 2019 edition of the Powerlist, ranking the 100 most influential Black Britons. Also in 2019, he played the position of goalkeeper for England in Soccer Aid for UNICEF 2019. Psychosis and Me, a documentary hosted and produced by Harewood received a BAFTA Television Award nominated for Single Documentary.

In October 2021, it was revealed that Harewood would make his feature directorial debut with For Whom The Bell Tolls, a boxing film about the rivalry between Chris Eubank and Nigel Benn.

In November 2021, The Guardian published an article focusing on Harewood and actor Ricardo P Lloyd comparing both of their lives and careers and the struggles black British actors face in the UK. This was part of Black British culture matters, curated by Lenny Henry and Marcus Ryder for The Guardian Saturday Culture Issue No7.

Harewood was appointed Member of the Order of the British Empire (MBE) in the 2012 New Year Honours for services to drama and Officer of the Order of the British Empire (OBE) in the 2023 New Year Honours for services to drama and charity. Harewood delivered the 2023 Richard Dimbleby Lecture.

In February 2024, Harewood was announced as the new President of the Royal Academy of Dramatic Art. Later that year, he appeared in the season finale of the Star Wars series The Acolyte portraying Rayencourt, a member of the Galactic Senate pushing for an external review of the Jedi Order.

== Other interests ==
=== Slavery reparations ===
Harewood campaigns for slavery reparations and is an advocate of the British government apologising for Britain's participation in the slave trade. His great-great-great-great grandparents had been slaves on a plantation in Barbados owned by Henry Lascelles, 2nd Earl of Harewood. Slaves were given surnames derived from those of their owners, hence Harewood's ancestors had to take their name from the Lascelles' title. Harewood engaged with David Lascelles, 8th Earl of Harewood, a descendant of the 2nd Earl, who also believes the government should apologise for the slave trade. As part of a BBC Look North programme in 2007, Harewood visited Lascelles' ancestral home Harewood House, which was built with the profits of slavery, and interviewed Lascelles on the subject. He did so again for a Channel 5 documentary in 2021.

In September 2023, a portrait of Harewood commissioned by Lascelles was put on display at Harewood House as an acknowledgement of their families' connected history. It will become part of the stately home's permanent collection. The portrait's unveiling was accompanied by a temporary exhibition at the house focussing on Harewood's life and career. Harewood described the hanging of the portrait as "well overdue for me and my ancestors", and commented that he hoped visitors to the house would

see a picture of a black person that they may recognise from the television, they will enquire as to why his picture is there, and then they'll understand… all of the unpaid work that my ancestors did, and the brutality of what they suffered… helped build this house.

=== Politics ===
In May 2012, Harewood presented a party election broadcast for the Labour Party. In the 2019 European Parliament election, he pledged his support for Change UK.

=== Charity ===
In 2007, Harewood donated his bone marrow, which was confirmed to have saved a stranger's life.

In October 2013, Harewood voiced an interactive video campaign for the British Lung Foundation aiming to ban smoking in cars with children inside throughout the United Kingdom.

Harewood appeared at Soccer Aid 2018 as England's celebrity goalkeeper, saving two penalties during the penalty shootout and helping England win the charity match. The event raised over £5 million for UNICEF.

=== Mental health ===
Harewood is a mental health campaigner, and made a 2019 BBC documentary titled David Harewood: Psychosis and Me based on his own experience of troubled mental health.

== Personal life ==
Harewood married his long-term girlfriend Kirsty Handy in February 2013 in Saint James, Barbados. They have two daughters together and live in the Streatham area of London. He is an avid supporter of his hometown football team Birmingham City.

Harewood has been open about his mental health troubles and has admitted that he used to self-medicate with alcohol and marijuana to deal with his bipolar-like symptoms, discarding the medication given to him by doctors. He was sectioned under the Mental Health Act, spent time on Whittington Hospital's psychiatric ward, and was prescribed the antipsychotic drug chlorpromazine. In a 2021 essay for The Guardian, he wrote:

I had consumed a fair amount of marijuana and was under a lot of stress; over the course of two years, I'd slowly come undone. I had spent weeks walking all over London, sometimes throughout the night, talking to strangers and following them wherever they led me. I'd black out only to regain consciousness in a completely different part of town, hours later, afraid and with absolutely no idea what had happened in the interval. Had it not been for some extraordinary friends who decided that I needed to be hospitalised, I might have vanished into the night for good. Worse still, I could have taken heed of the incredibly real and convincing voices in my head and simply thrown myself off Westminster Bridge. Instead, I found myself sectioned under the Mental Health Act.

== Filmography ==
=== Film ===
Year	Title	Role	Notes
1993	The Hawk	Sergeant Streete	
1995	Mad Dogs and Englishmen	Jessop	
1999	I Wonder Who's Kissing You Now	Moses	
1999	Between Dreams	Orderly	Short film
2004	Strings	Erito (voice)	English dub
2004	The Merchant of Venice	Prince of Morocco	
2005	Separate Lies	Inspector Marshall	
2006	Blood Diamond	Captain 'Poison'	
2010	Second Chance	Rob Jenkins	Short film
2011	The Hot Potato	Harrison	
2011	Victim	Mr Ansah	
2012	The Man Inside	Eugene Murdoch	
2012	The Last Bite	Rook	Short film
2013	Third Person	Jake	
2015	Free in Deed	Abe Wilkins	
2015	Spooks: The Greater Good	Warrender	
2016	Grimsby	Black Gareth	
2017	Tulip Fever	Prater	
2018	Parallel	Mr Parkes	
2022	Wendell & Wild	Lane Klaxon (voice)	

=== Television ===
Year(s)	Title	Role	Notes
1990	Casualty	Paul Grant	Episode 5.9: "A Will to Die"
1990–1997	The Bill	Williams / Malcolm Jackson / Ed Parrish / Robbie Coker	Four episodes
1991	For the Greater Good	David West	TV film
1991	Minder	Vinny's Minder	Episode 8.10: "Too Many Crooks"
1991	Murder Most Horrid	Jonathan	Episode 1.5: "Murder at Tea Time"
1991	Pirate Prince	Jean-Baptiste	TV film
1991–1992	Spatz	Derek Puley	Three episodes
1993	Anna Lee: Headcase	Stevie Johnson	TV film
1993	Press Gang	Doctor	Episode 5.2: "Friendly Fire"
1993	Medics	Nick	Episode 3.6
1993	Harnessing Peacocks	Terry	TV film
1994	Great Moments in Aviation	Steward	TV film
1994	Bermuda Grace	Trevor Watkins	TV film
1994	Capital Lives	Unknown	Episode 1.5: "Fall"
1995	Hearts and Minds	Trevor	
1995	Game On	Paul Johnson	Episode 1.5: "Big Wednesday"
1995	Agony Again	Daniel	Seven episodes
1997	Macbeth on the Estate	Macduff	TV film
1997	Kavanagh QC	David Adams	Episode 3.1: "Mute of Malice"
1997	Comedy Premieres: Cold Feet	Police Sergeant	
1998	Ballykissangel	Henry	Episode 4.9: "As Stars Look Down"
1999–2001	Always and Everyone	Mike Gregson	Main cast
1999–2003	The Vice	Sergeant / D.I. Joe Robinson	Main cast
2001	An Unsuitable Job for a Woman	D.I. Peterson	Episode 1.4: "Playing God"
2001	The Fear	Storyteller	
2001–2002	Babyfather	Augustus 'Gus' Pottinger	Main cast
2004	Silent Witness	Angus Stuart	Episodes 8.3 and 8.4: "Death by Water"
2004–2005	Fat Friends	Max Robertson	11 episodes
2006	New Street Law	D.I. Branston	Two episodes
2006	The Ruby in the Smoke	Matthew Bedwell / Reverend Nicholas Bedwell	TV film
2007	New Tricks	Martin Viner	Episode 4.3: "Ducking and Diving"
2007	The Shadow in the North	Nicholas Bedwell	TV film
2008	The Palace	Major Simon Brooks	Main cast; eight episodes
2008	The Last Enemy	Patrick Nye	TV mini-series; five episodes
2008	Criminal Justice	Freddie Graham	TV mini-series; three episodes
2009	Gunrush	Robbie	TV film
2009	Robin Hood	Tuck	12 episodes
2009	The Fixer	Richard Millar	Episode 2.4
2009–2010	Doctor Who	Joshua Naismith	"The End of Time"
2010	Mrs Mandela	Nelson Mandela	TV film
2010	Strike Back	Colonel Tshuma	Episodes 1.3 and 1.4
2011	Hustle	Don Coleman	Episode 7.5: "The Fall of Railton FC"
2011	Frankenstein's Wedding	The Creature	Live-televised stage performance
2011	The Body Farm	Wilkes	Episode 1.3
2011–2012	Homeland	David Estes	24 episodes
2012	Treasure Island	Billy Bones	TV mini-series
2012	Horizon – Global Weirding	Narrator	TV documentary series
2013	The Wrong Mans	Surgeon	TV series
2013	By Any Means	Napier	TV series
2014	Selfie	Sam Saperstein	8 episodes
2015–2021	Supergirl	J'onn J'onzz / Martian Manhunter / Hank Henshaw / Cyborg Superman	Main role; directed 4 episodes Nominated – Saturn Award for Best Supporting Actor on Television (2019)
2016	Beowulf: Return to the Shieldlands	Scorann	TV series
2016	The Night Manager	Joel Steadman	TV series
2016	Will Britain ever have a Black Prime Minister?	Presenter	TV documentary
2017	Madiba	Walter Sisulu	Miniseries
2017	Have I Got News For You	Himself	Guest host
2017–2019	The Flash	J'onn J'onzz / Martian Manhunter	Episodes: "Duet", "Crisis on Infinite Earths Part 3"
2018	David Harewood: My Psychosis and Me	Presenter	TV documentary
2019	The Man in the High Castle	Equiano Hampton	Episodes 4.2 and 4.5
2020	Earth's Tropical Islands	Himself / narrator	TV documentary
2020	Arrow	J'onn J'onzz / Martian Manhunter	Episode: "Crisis on Infinite Earths, Part 4"
2020	Legends of Tomorrow	J'onn J'onzz / Martian Manhunter	Episode: "Crisis on Infinite Earths, Part 5"
2021	Terry Pratchett's The Abominable Snow Baby	Narrator	Animated short story
2022	Ten Percent	Himself	Episode 8
2022	Hitler: The Lost Tapes	Narrator	4 Episodes
2023	Get On Up: The Triumph of Black America	Presenter / narrator	Two-part documentary
2023	David Harewood on Blackface	Presenter / narrator	Documentary
2023	Dickens in Italy with David Harewood	Presenter / narrator	Two-part documentary
2024	Star Wars: The Acolyte	Senator Rayencourt	Episode: "The Acolyte"
2024–present	The Agency	Dalaga	7 episodes
2025	Happy Face	Dr. Greg	Main cast
2026	Pierre	Pierre	Lead role

=== Video games ===
Year	Title	Role	Notes
2011	Battlefield 3	Captain Quinton Cole	
2013	Killzone: Shadow Fall	Sinclair / Vektan Security Agency Director	
2016	Call of Duty: Infinite Warfare	Staff Sergeant Usef Omar	
2023	Alan Wake II	Warlin Door	Cutscenes only

=== Radio ===
Harewood played Thurman Berkley in the first series of the BBC radio series Chambers, broadcast on 4 May 1996. He played Patroclus in the 1998 BBC radio trilogy Troy. He also played Henry Tilney in the Northanger Abbey radio adaptation (2005). On 4 May 2012, he hosted a special BBC Radio 2 Friday Night is Music Night celebrating the life of Ray Charles, broadcast live from Cheltenham Jazz Festival. The show featured the Guy Barker orchestra, with leader Cynthia Fleming and guest artists Madeline Bell, Gregory Porter, and James Tormé.

Harewood played the Marquis de Carabas in the BBC Radio 4 Radio Play of Neverwhere (2013).

In 2022, Harewood voiced Destruction of the Endless in Act III of Audible's full-cast audiobook adaptation of Neil Gaiman's comic The Sandman.

=== Awards and nominations ===
- Screen Actors Guild Awards-Outstanding Performance by an Ensemble in a Drama Series: Nominated (2012)
- Nashville Film Festival-Best Actor: Winner (2016)
- Independent Spirit Awards-Best Male Lead: Nominated (2017)
- Saturn Award-Best Supporting Actor on a Television Series: Nominated (2019)
- Edinburgh TV Festival-Variety Outstanding Achievement Award: Winner (2020)
- Officer of the Order of the British Empire for services to drama (2023)

== Books ==
- Harewood, David (2021). Maybe I Don't Belong Here. Bluebird. ISBN 978-1-5290-6413-1. Harewood's memoir.
