= The Ruby in the Smoke =

1985 novel by Philip Pullman

- Cover of the first edition
- Author: Philip Pullman
- Illustrator: Fred Booth
- Language: English
- Series: Sally Lockhart series
- Genre: Mystery, young adult novel
- Publisher: Oxford University Press
- Publication date: 1985
- Publication place: United Kingdom
- Media type: Print (hardback & paperback)
- Pages: 200 pp
- ISBN: 0-19-271543-7
- OCLC: 59171883
- Followed by: The Shadow in the North

The Ruby in the Smoke is a mystery novel for young adults by the English author Philip Pullman published in 1985. The story is set in the Victorian era, where 16-year-old Sally Lockhart discovers the reason of her father's mysterious death.

It went on to win the 1987 Lancashire Children's Book of the Year Award. It was also adapted for television in 2006. This book is the first of the Sally Lockhart Quartet. It is followed by The Shadow in the North, The Tiger in the Well and The Tin Princess. The book was also adapted for the stage at the Edinburgh Festival Fringe in August 2016.

== TV adaptation ==
A TV film adaptation written by Adrian Hodges and starring Billie Piper was produced by the BBC. It aired on BBC One on 27 December 2006 and on PBS's Masterpiece Mystery! as The Sally Lockhart Mysteries: The Ruby in the Smoke on 4 February 2007. The UK broadcast attracted 7.07 million viewers. It is notable as marking the TV debut of actor Matt Smith, who would later take over the role of the Eleventh Doctor in Doctor Who, in which Piper had previously featured.

All four Sally Lockhart books were expected to be adapted for television; as of December 2025 no information has arisen regarding an adaptation of the third and fourth books.

=== Cast ===
Actor	Role
Billie Piper	Sally Lockhart
Julie Walters	Mrs Holland
JJ Feild	Frederick "Fred" Garland
Matt Smith	Jim Taylor
Hayley Atwell	Rosa Garland
Chloe Walker	Adelaide
David Harewood	Matthew and Nicholas Bedwell
Robert Glenister	Samuel Selby
Elliot Cowan	Henrick Van Eeden
Miles Anderson	Major Marchbanks
Siân Thomas	Mrs Rees

== Stage adaptation ==
In the summer of 2016, a stage adaptation written and directed by Madeleine Perham was performed at The Pleasance during the Edinburgh Fringe after receiving Pullman's blessing. Running for the month of August in the King Dome venue, the performance was hailed as a critical success, with The Scotsman stating that the show was "a compelling tale, and full of surprises, moral ambiguities and people who are other than they seem". Jane Berg from Three Weeks awarded the show five stars, stating that the show "was one of the most enjoyable hours I've spent at this festival". Broadway Baby, the local reviews website, stated that the show "delighted in its Victorian setting" and was an "excellent piece of storytelling", going on to award The Ruby in the Smoke four stars.

The show was created by new theatre company Reprint Productions (now Escapade), with a cast of six who multi-roled the numerous characters in the show: Rebecca Lenihan, Sydney Austin, Tris Hobson, Martin Coates, Hamish Forbes and Madeleine Golding (who also served as producer and co-founder of Reprint).
