= Matt Smith =

English actor (born 1982)

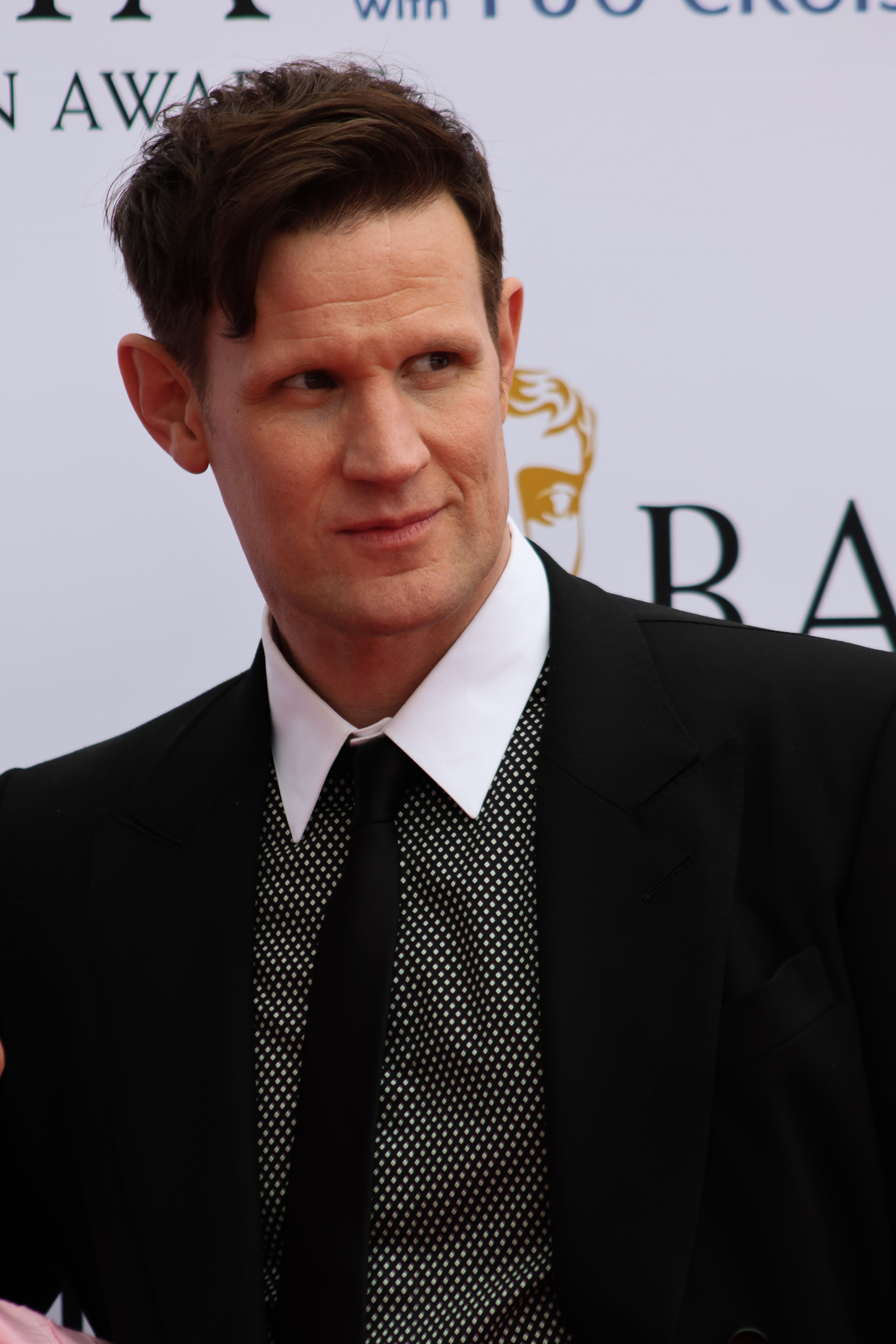
- Matt Smith at the TV BAFTA red carpet 2026
- Born: Matthew Robert Smith; 28 October 1982 (age 44); Northampton, East Midlands, England
- Education: University of East Anglia (BA)
- Occupation: Actor
- Years active: 2001–present

Matthew Robert Smith (born 28 October 1982) is an English actor. He is best known as the Eleventh Doctor in Doctor Who (2010–2013), Prince Philip, Duke of Edinburgh in The Crown (2016–2017), for which he received a Primetime Emmy Award nomination, and Daemon Targaryen in House of the Dragon (2022–present).

Smith initially aspired to be a professional footballer, but spondylolysis forced him out of the sport. After joining the National Youth Theatre and studying drama and creative writing at the University of East Anglia, he became an actor in 2003, performing in plays including Murder in the Cathedral, Fresh Kills, The History Boys and On the Shore of the Wide World in London theatres. Extending his repertoire into West End theatre, he has since performed in the stage adaptation of Swimming with Sharks with Christian Slater, followed a year later by a critically acclaimed performance in That Face.

Smith's first television role came in 2006 as Jim Taylor in the BBC adaptations of Philip Pullman's The Ruby in the Smoke and The Shadow in the North, while his first major TV role came as Danny in the 2007 BBC series Party Animals. In film, he has played the physical forms of Skynet in the sci-fi action film Terminator Genisys (2015), a 1960s pimp in the psychological horror film Last Night in Soho (2021), Milo Morbius in the superhero film Morbius (2022), and a 1990s punk in the Darren Aronofsky crime thriller Caught Stealing (2025).

== Early life and education ==
Matthew Robert Smith was born on 28 October 1982 in Northampton, England, the son of Lynne and David Smith. He has an elder sister named Laura Jayne, who was one of the dancers featured in the music video for Eric Prydz's 2004 song "Call on Me". Smith attended Northampton School for Boys. His grandfather had played football for Notts County and Smith had also planned to play football, having played for the youth teams of Northampton Town, Nottingham Forest, and Leicester City, becoming captain of the latter's youth team. A serious back injury resulted in spondylolysis; he was unable to continue with a footballing career.

Smith's drama teacher introduced him to acting by signing him up for theatrical productions without his consent. After Smith failed to participate on the first two occasions, his teacher arranged for him to play the tenth juror in an adaptation of Twelve Angry Men. Although he took part, he refused to attend a drama festival for which his teacher had also signed him up, as he saw himself as a footballer and believed acting would damage his social life. His teacher persisted, eventually persuading him to join the National Youth Theatre in London. After leaving school, Smith studied Drama and Creative Writing at the University of East Anglia, graduating in 2005. With the National Youth Theatre, he played Thomas Becket in Murder in the Cathedral (2003) and Bassoon in The Master and Margarita (2004). His role in the latter earned him an agent and his first professional jobs, Fresh Kills and On the Shore of the Wide World, which led him to seek an agreement with his university so that he could graduate without attending lectures in his final year.

== Career ==
=== 2006–2009: Rise to prominence ===
Smith's first television role was as Jim Taylor in the BBC adaptations of the Sally Lockhart quartet books The Ruby in the Smoke and The Shadow in the North. His first major television role came in the television series Party Animals, a BBC drama series about fictional parliamentary advisors and researchers. Smith portrayed Danny Foster, a parliamentary researcher who was described as an intelligent but timid "politics geek" who should have moved on from researching at his age. In an interview in 2007, Smith summarised the character as having a romantic outlook of the political world while being cynical elsewhere. He talked about his character's emotional and intellectual maturity; emotionally, he lacks confidence around women, though Smith portrays him as a caring and sensitive but "wry, sarcastic, [and] witty" romantic. Intellectually, Danny is portrayed as attentive and possessing a strong work ethic.

During Smith's tenure in On the Shore of the Wide World, the play transferred to the Royal National Theatre in London. After finishing the play, he took on the role of Lockwood, a pupil in the Alan Bennett play The History Boys. After The History Boys, he acted in the teen play Burn/Chatroom/Citizenship and with Christian Slater in Swimming with Sharks, the latter being his West End début. In 2007, Smith appeared as Henry in the Polly Stenham play That Face at the Royal Court Theatre Upstairs in Chelsea. The play transferred to the Duke of York's Theatre in the West End in 2008 and became Smith's second role there. That Face focuses primarily upon alcohol and drug addiction in an upper-middle-class family after the paternal figure in the family leaves. As Henry, Smith portrayed an aspiring artist who left school to take care of his mother. To prepare for the role, the cast interviewed alcoholics and their families. Smith discussed his character's relationship with his mother in a May 2008 interview with the Evening Standard, saying, "The thing I find tricky to get my head round is why doesn't he just leave? An awful lot of it is co-dependency. ... With Henry there's a real belief—or denial maybe—that he can change his mother. When she is finally pulled away from him to go to rehab, his identity collapses. His sacrifice has been for nothing." The entire cast of the play was nominated for the 2008 Laurence Olivier Award for Outstanding Achievement in an Affiliate Theatre, and Smith garnered an Evening Standard Theatre Award nomination for Best Newcomer for his role. Upon its transfer to the West End, Smith's performance as Henry was highlighted as one of the positive aspects of the play by critics for the Evening Standard, Daily Express, The Guardian and The Times.

Smith auditioned for the role of Will McKenzie in the comedy series The Inbetweeners, with the part eventually being given to comedian and actor Simon Bird. The show's writer Iain Morris said, "We auditioned literally 1000 people [...] He was brilliant - down to the last two for Will, I think. I think he was a bit too dashing!" Smith was cast in Martin McDonagh's black comedy crime In Bruges (2008), as the younger version of Ralph Fiennes' character, but his scenes did not appear in the final cut of the film. He starred in the 2009 short film Together and the film Womb (2010).

=== 2010–2013: Doctor Who and wider recognition ===
The Doctor is a very special part, and it takes a very special actor to play him. You need to be old and young at the same time, a boffin and an action hero, a cheeky schoolboy and the wise old man of the universe. As soon as Matt walked through the door, and blew us away with a bold and brand new take on the Time Lord, we knew we had our man.

— Executive producer Steven Moffat on Smith's casting.

Smith was revealed as the Eleventh Doctor in the British science-fiction television series Doctor Who in January 2009 to follow David Tennant, who announced his departure in October 2008. Smith was a relatively unknown actor compared to the actors then speculated about possibly taking on the role, who included Paterson Joseph, David Morrissey, Sean Pertwee, James Nesbitt, Russell Tovey, Catherine Zeta-Jones, Chiwetel Ejiofor, Robert Carlyle, and Billie Piper. Smith was first named as a possible successor less than a day before he was announced as the Eleventh Doctor, on the edition of 3 January 2009 of BBC Breakfast, among the names speculated about. His obscurity prompted the news headline "Doctor Who?", a riff on the show's title.

Prior to auditioning for the role, Smith had never seen Doctor Who. Smith was one of the earliest actors to audition for the role, performing on the first day. The production team, consisting of incoming producer Steven Moffat and BBC Wales Head of Drama and executive producer Piers Wenger, immediately singled him out based on his performance. Smith additionally auditioned for the role of John Watson in the Moffat-created Sherlock, undergoing auditions at the same time; he was unsuccessful, as Moffat believed his eccentric acting style was closer to Holmes, a role that had already been given to Benedict Cumberbatch. At 26 years old, Smith was three years younger than Peter Davison was at the time of his casting as the Doctor in 1981, making him the youngest Doctor and the youngest actor to be suggested for the role. After three weeks of auditions, Moffat and Wenger agreed that it had "always been Matt" and approached him to accept the role.

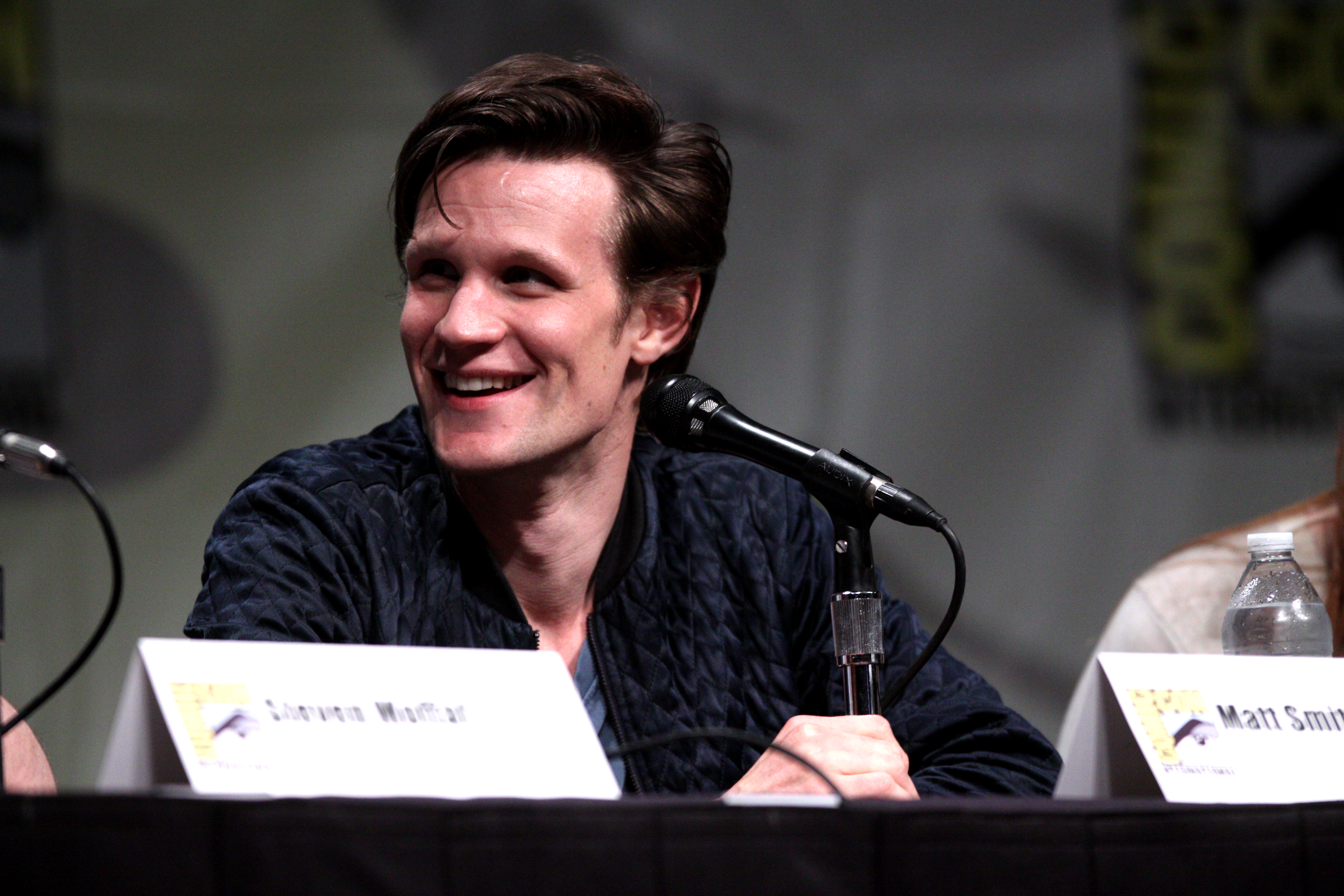
Smith in July 2012

Smith made his debut as the Doctor in the episode "The Eleventh Hour" in April 2010. The BBC were cautious about casting Smith because they felt that a 26-year-old could not play the Doctor adequately; Wenger shared the same sentiment but thought Smith had proven his acting quality in Party Animals, which Wenger thought highlighted Smith's "mercurial qualities". Some fans of the show believed that Smith was inexperienced and too young for the role, while others supported him by citing his demonstrated acting ability. For his performance in his first series, he was nominated in the Outstanding Drama Performance Category of the National Television Awards. Smith is the first actor in the role to garner a nomination for a British Academy Television Award for Best Actor.

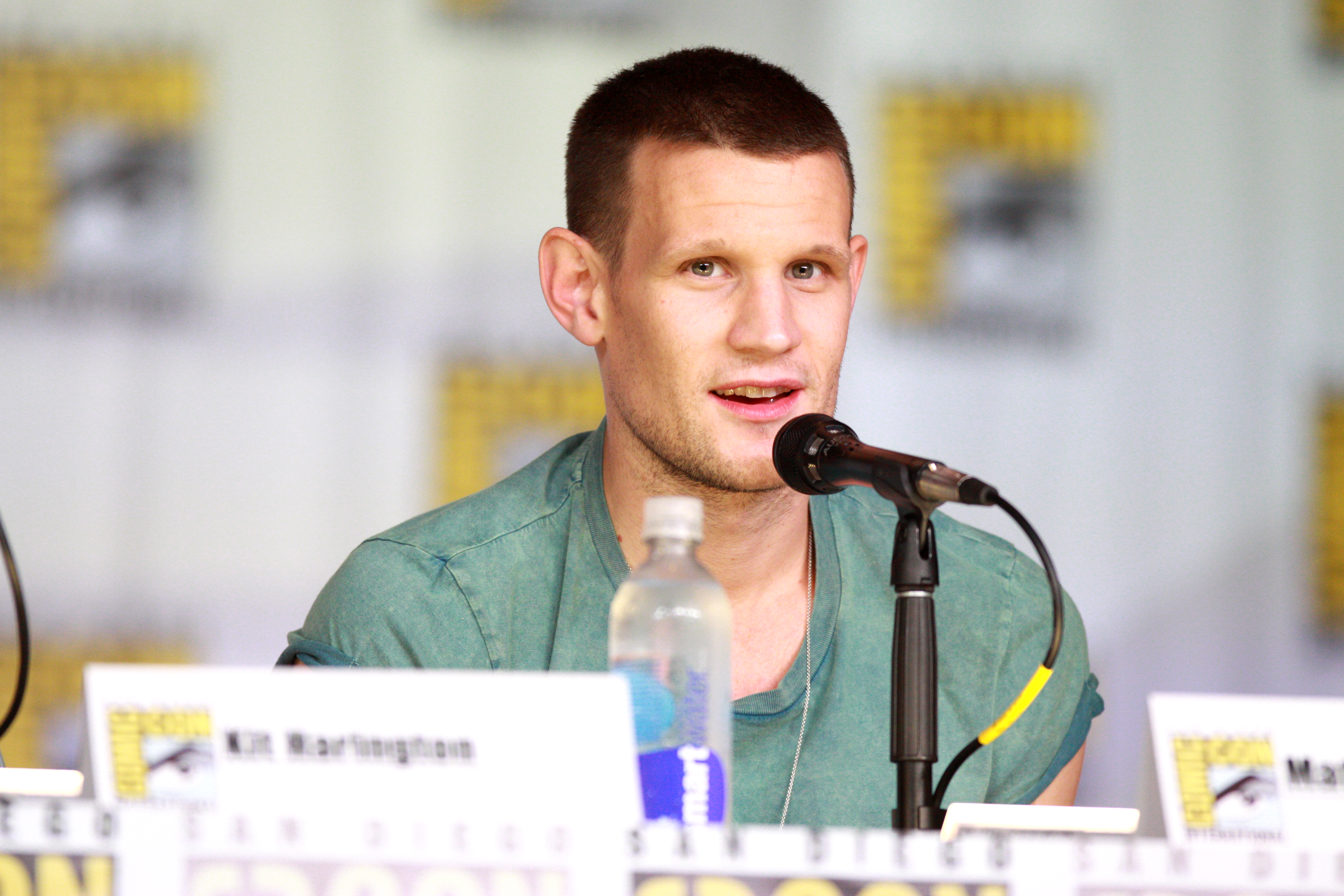
Matt Smith in 2013

Smith said of his character: "The Doctor is excited and fascinated by the tiniest of things. By everything. By every single thing. That's what's wonderful about him as a character. It's why children like him, I think. Because he doesn't dismiss anything. He's not cynical. He's open to every single facet of the universe." In June 2010, Smith appeared on stage with Orbital, and performed with them a version of the Doctor Who theme, at the Glastonbury Festival. Smith hosted the Doctor Who Prom at the Royal Albert Hall on 24–25 July 2010. On the morning of 26 May 2012, Smith carried the Olympic torch in Cardiff, an activity which was noted by Doctor Who fans for its resemblance to a 2006 episode of the show in which the Doctor carried the torch. On 1 June 2013, the BBC announced that Smith would be leaving Doctor Who at the end of the 2013 Christmas special. He was succeeded by Peter Capaldi. Reflecting upon his decision to leave in a 2016 interview, he expressed regret for not staying longer, stating that he wanted to work longer with co-star Jenna Coleman. In 2018, while appearing on Desert Island Discs, he revealed that he nearly turned down the role of the Doctor. Smith's directorial debut, the short film Cargese, was aired on Sky Arts in May 2013.

=== 2014–present: The Crown and House of the Dragon ===
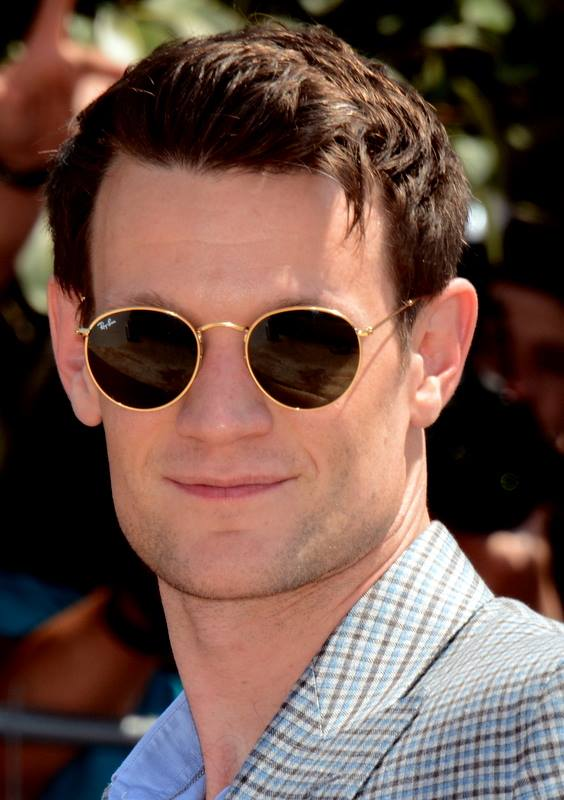
Smith at Cannes in 2014

Smith portrayed Patrick Bateman in the musical adaptation of American Psycho at London's Almeida Theatre from 2013 to 2014. Smith was cast in Ryan Gosling's directorial debut Lost River, which was released in 2014. Smith had a supporting role as the embodiment of Skynet in Terminator Genisys (2015). He was set to have more screen time in the sixth and seventh films in the series, but these proposed films were cancelled in the wake of Terminator Genisys' commercial and critical failure. On 20 November 2014, it was announced that Smith would star in the action-thriller film Patient Zero. It was released in 2018, and received negative reviews. Speaking about the film, Smith said: "I call (it) 'Patient Career Low'. I've never seen it... You know at the time when you're making something you're like 'this is gonna be rubbish'? ... Yeah, that."

In June 2015, Smith was cast as Prince Philip in the Netflix royal drama The Crown. He played the role for the series' first two seasons, garnering a nomination for the Primetime Emmy Award for Outstanding Supporting Actor in a Drama Series in 2018. Also in 2018 he portrayed the culturally groundbreakung avant-garde photographer Robert Mapplethorpe in the eponymously titled biopic Mapplethorpe. Smith reunited with his The Crown co-star Claire Foy in a production of the Duncan Macmillan play Lungs at The Old Vic beginning in October 2019.

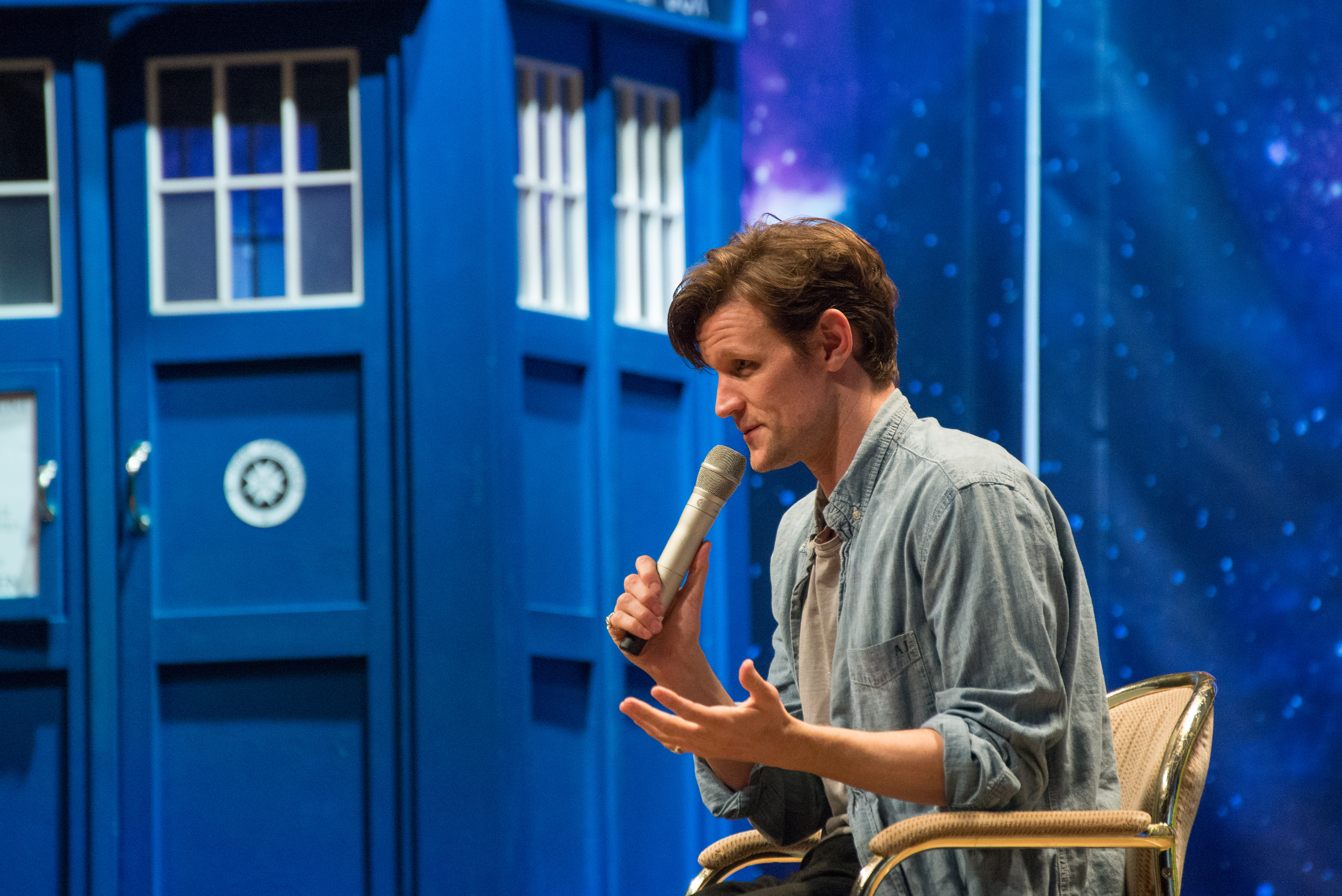
Matt Smith on FedCon 2017

In 2020, Smith was cast as Daemon Targaryen in the HBO fantasy series House of the Dragon, a prequel to the fantasy drama series Game of Thrones. The series premiered on 21 August 2022. For his performance he received a nomination for the Critics' Choice Television Award for Best Supporting Actor in a Drama Series in 2023. Smith joined the cast of Edgar Wright's psychological horror-mystery Last Night in Soho starring opposite Thomasin McKenzie and Anya Taylor-Joy. The film was released in 2021. In 2021, Smith appeared in the music videos for the songs "We're On Our Way Now" and "Flying on the Ground" by Noel Gallagher's High Flying Birds.

Smith joined the Sony's Spider-Man Universe spin-off film Morbius (2022) as Lucien / Milo Morbius, a living vampire, although he was initially announced to be portraying the supervillain Loxias Crown / Hunger. It received negative reviews, although Smith's performance garnered some praise from critics. In 2024 Smith returned to the West End to star in a modern retelling of the Henrik Ibsen play An Enemy of the People. He portrayed Dr. Thomas Stockmann acting opposite Jessica Brown Findlay portraying his daughter, Petra Stockmann. Time Out wrote, "In a fine cast, it often feels like Smith is happy to keep it low-key, a largely charming stage presence who doesn't attempt to upstage [the cast]". Nick Curtis of The Evening Standard gave the mixed review writing, "The casually charismatic Smith and a fine supporting cast can't stop it falling apart in the second half."

In 2027, Smith will play Andrew Martin in The Humans, adapted by Jack Thorne based on Matt Haig's novel for a limited 13-week run from 30 October at the Theatre Royal Haymarket.

== Personal life ==
Smith was in a relationship with Brazilian actress and singer Mayana Moura from 2008 to 2009. He later had an on-off relationship with model Daisy Lowe from 2010 to 2014. From 2014 to 2019, he was in a relationship with actress Lily James.

Smith is an atheist. He is a supporter of Blackburn Rovers. He has cited the band Radiohead as an influence. He has also referred to Oasis as "the greatest rock-and-roll band in the world"; a friend of Noel Gallagher, he attended his 50th birthday party in 2017.

In 2015, Smith was named one of GQ's 50 Best-Dressed British Men.

== Acting credits ==
Key
†	Denotes films that have not yet been released

=== Film ===
Year	Title	Role	Notes	Ref
2008	In Bruges	Young Harry Waters	Deleted scene	
2010	Womb	Thomas		
2014	Lost River	Bully		
2015	Terminator Genisys	Alex / Skynet / The T-5000	Credited as Matthew Smith	
2016	Pride and Prejudice and Zombies	Mr. Parson William Collins		
2018	Mapplethorpe	Robert Mapplethorpe		
2018	Patient Zero	Morgan		
2018	Charlie Says	Charles Manson		
2019	Official Secrets	Martin Bright		
2020	His House	Mark Essworth		
2021	Last Night in Soho	Jack		
2021	The Forgiven	Richard Galloway		
2022	Morbius	Lucien / Milo Morbius		
2023	Starve Acre	Richard		
2025	Caught Stealing	Russ Binder		
2027	Star Wars: Starfighter †	TBA	Post-production	

=== Television ===
Year	Title	Role	Notes
2006	The Ruby in the Smoke	Jim Taylor	Television film
2007	The Shadow in the North	Jim Taylor	Television film
2007	Party Animals	Danny Foster	Main cast
2007	Secret Diary of a Call Girl	Tim	1 episode
2007	The Street	Ian Hanley	1 episode
2009	Moses Jones	DS Dan Twentyman	Miniseries, 3 episodes
2010–2014	Doctor Who	Eleventh Doctor	Main cast (series 5–7, 2013 specials); Guest role (series 8, 1 episode)
2010	The Sarah Jane Adventures	Eleventh Doctor	Guest role, 2-part episode: Death of the Doctor
2011	Christopher and His Kind	Christopher Isherwood	Television film
2012	Bert and Dickie	Bert Bushnell	Television film
2013	An Adventure in Space and Time	Himself	Television film
2013	The Five(ish) Doctors Reboot	Himself	Television film
2016–2017	The Crown	Prince Philip, Duke of Edinburgh	Main role (seasons 1–2)
2021	This Time with Alan Partridge	Dan Milner	1 episode
2021	Superworm	Superworm	Voice
2022–present	House of the Dragon	Daemon Targaryen	Main cast; 25 episodes
2025	The Death of Bunny Munro	Bunny Munro	Main cast, also executive producer

=== Theatre ===
Year	Title	Role	Notes	Ref.
2003	Murder in the Cathedral	Thomas Becket	National Youth Theatre	
2004	The Master and Margarita	Basoon	Lyric Hammersmith	
2004	Fresh Kills	Arnold	Royal Court Theatre Upstairs	
2005	On the Shore of the Wide World	Paul Danzinger	Royal Exchange; Royal National Theatre	
2005–2006	The History Boys	Lockwood	Royal National Theatre	
2006	Burn/Chatroom/Citizenship	Tom/William/Gary	Royal National Theatre	
2007	That Face	Henry	Royal Court Theatre Upstairs	
2007–2008	Swimming with Sharks	Guy	Vaudeville Theatre	
2008	That Face	Henry	Duke of York's Theatre	
2010	Doctor Who Live: The Monsters Are Coming!	Eleventh Doctor	Wembley Arena	
2011–2012	The Crash of the Elysium	Eleventh Doctor	MediaCityUK	
2013–2014	American Psycho	Patrick Bateman	Almeida Theatre	
2016	Unreachable	Maxim	Royal Court Theatre	
2019	Lungs	M	The Old Vic	
2024	An Enemy of the People	Thomas Stockmann	Duke of York's Theatre	
2027	The Humans	Andrew Martin	Theatre Royal Haymarket	

=== Video games ===
Year	Title	Role	Notes	Ref.
2010	Doctor Who: The Adventure Games	Eleventh Doctor		
2010	Doctor Who: Return to Earth	Eleventh Doctor		
2010	Doctor Who: Evacuation Earth	Eleventh Doctor		
2012	Doctor Who: The Eternity Clock	Eleventh Doctor		
2015	Lego Dimensions	Eleventh Doctor	Archive audio	

=== Short film ===
Year	Title	Role	Notes	Ref.
2009	Together	Rob		

=== Audio ===
Year	Title	Role	Notes	Ref.
2010	Doctor Who: The Runaway Train	Narrator	BBC Audio	
2011	Doctor Who: The Jade Pyramid	Narrator	BBC Audio	
2011	Doctor Who: The Hounds of Artemis	Narrator	BBC Audio	
2026	The Wolf	James Pierce	Main role	

=== Web ===
Year	Title	Role	Notes	Ref.
2020	The Doctors Say Thank You	Himself		
2026	Royal Court	Himself	Episode; "Matt Smith Joins Brittany Broski's Royal Court"	

== Awards and nominations ==
Year	Award	Category	Work	Result	Ref.
2010	TV Quick Awards	Best Actor	Doctor Who	Nominated	
2011	SFX Awards	Best Actor	Doctor Who	Won	
2011	National Television Awards	Outstanding Drama Performance: Male	Doctor Who	Nominated	
2011	BAFTA TV Awards	Best Actor	Doctor Who	Nominated	
2011	TV Quick Awards	Best Actor	Doctor Who	Nominated	
2012	TV Quick Awards	Best Actor	Doctor Who	Nominated	
2012	SFX Awards	Best Actor	Doctor Who	Won	
2012	National Television Awards	Outstanding Drama Performance: Male	Doctor Who	Won	
2013	National Television Awards	Outstanding Drama Performance: Male	Doctor Who	Nominated	
2014	National Television Awards	Outstanding Drama Performance: Male	Doctor Who	Won	
2016	BloodGuts UK Horror Awards	Best Supporting Actor	Pride and Prejudice and Zombies	Nominated	
2017	Screen Actors Guild Awards	Outstanding Performance by an Ensemble in a Drama Series	The Crown	Nominated	
2017	Broadcasting Press Guild Awards	Best Actor	The Crown	Nominated	
2017	Online Film & Television Association Awards	Best Actor in a Drama Series	The Crown	Nominated	
2018	Primetime Emmy Award	Outstanding Supporting Actor in a Drama Series	The Crown	Nominated	
2018	Screen Actors Guild Awards	Outstanding Performance by an Ensemble in a Drama Series	The Crown	Nominated	
2023	Critics' Choice Awards	Best Supporting Actor in a Drama Series	House of the Dragon	Nominated	
2026	British Academy Television Awards	Best Actor	The Death of Bunny Munro	Nominated	

== See also ==
- List of atheists in film, radio, television and theatre
- List of British actors
