= Hitler: The Lost Tapes =

British television documentary

- Narrated by: David Harewood
- Original language: English
- No. of seasons: 1
- No. of episodes: 4

Production
- Running time: 47 minutes
- Production company: Woodcut Media

Original release
- Network: Channel 4
- Release: 17 September – 22 October 2022

Hitler: The Lost Tapes is a British documentary series about the rise and fall of Adolf Hitler and Nazi Germany through analysis of digitized rarely-seen photographs taken by Hitler's photographer Heinrich Hoffmann and from Eva Braun's personal photo collection including home videos shot by Braun mostly at Hitler's Berghof estate as told by historians including Guy Walters. The series premiered on 17 September 2022 and concluded on 1 October with a total of four episodes. The show was originally titled Hitler: A Life In Pictures and was bought by Channel 4 in February 2022.

== Episodes ==
No. overall	No. in series	Title	Directed by	Original release date
1	1	"The Struggle"	Johnathan Mayo	17 September 2022
Heinrich Hoffmann's photographs are a remarkable record of Hitler's rise to power
1	2	"In Power"	Johnathan Mayo	24 September 2022
How Hitler and his party used the latest propaganda means to mould Germany in their image
1	3	"Hitler's Secret Life"	Johnathan Mayo	1 October 2022
Hitler needed female companionship, notably his niece and his mistress Eva Braun
1	4	"1939"	Johnathan Mayo	1 October 2022
After the humiliation of World War I, Hitler was determined to crush communism

== Reception ==
Anita Singh, the arts and entertainment editor of The Daily Telegraph criticized the series' use of "The Lost Tapes" in the title claiming, "The suspicion is that Channel 4 slaps these titles on its documentaries because it feels the need to make them sound splashy." But said the show had "interesting information, packaged in the wrong way." And that the show would have better focused on examining the relationship between Hitler and Hoffman in greater depth.

Pat Stacey of the Irish Independent wrote in his review giving the series a rating of two out of five, "When it comes to television, it’s always going to be springtime for Hitler anyway. Broadcasters know there’s a ready-made audience who just can’t get enough of the stumpy Austrian corporal, no matter how thin or dubious the material."
