= JJ Feild =

Anglo-American actor (born 1978)

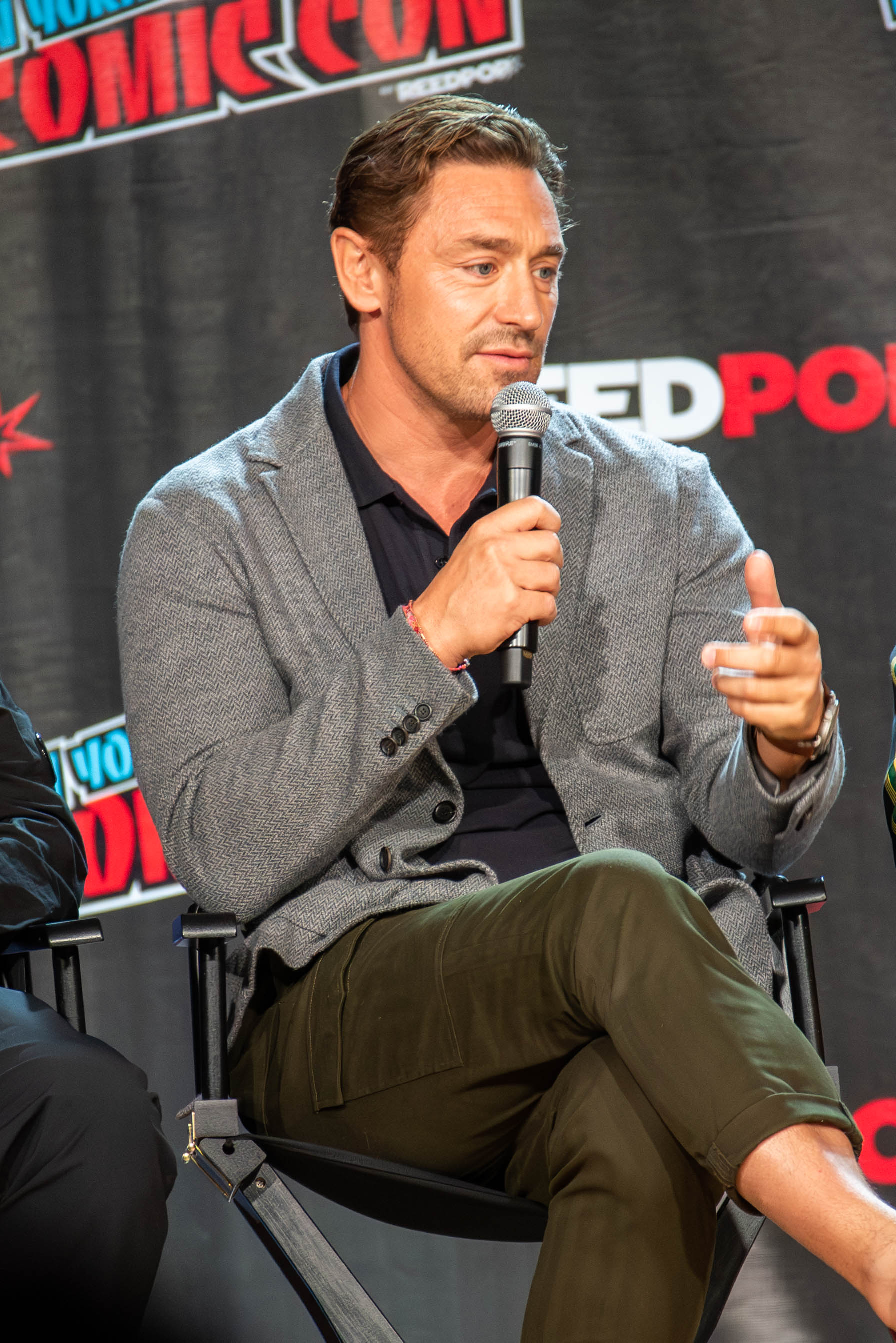
- Feild at New York Comic Con 2022
- Born: John Joseph Feild; April 1, 1978 (age 48); Boulder, Colorado, U.S.
- Education: Fine Arts College; Webber Douglas Academy of Dramatic Art
- Occupation: Actor
- Years active: 1999–present
- Partner: Neve Campbell (2011–present)
- Children: 2
- Father: Reshad Feild

John Joseph Feild (born 1 April 1978) is a British-American film, television, and theatre actor. He started his television career in 1999. He played Fred Garland in Philip Pullman's The Ruby in the Smoke and The Shadow in the North television adaptations. In 2007, he starred as Henry Tilney in the television film Northanger Abbey. The following year, he made his West End debut in a production of Ring Round the Moon. From 2014 to 2016, he portrayed Major John André in Turn: Washington's Spies. His film credits include Telstar (2009), Captain America: The First Avenger (2011), Austenland (2013), and Professor Marston and the Wonder Women (2017).

== Early life and education ==
John Joseph Feild was born in Boulder, Colorado, to British writer and former musician Reshad Feild and his American wife. Feild and his parents moved to London when he was six months old (he says he "never walked in America"). His parents later divorced and both remarried.

== Career ==
Feild received his first television role in 1999, and has since appeared in several films and television shows. He played the role of Simon Doyle in the Poirot series adaptation of Death on the Nile, and as Paul Osbourne in the Marple version of The Pale Horse. He has also appeared in Reach for the Moon, Northanger Abbey as Henry Tilney, and as Frederick Garland in the BBC adaptations of Philip Pullman's The Ruby in the Smoke and The Shadow in the North. His film roles include playing the younger version of Michael Caine's character in Last Orders, Hamish in The Intended, and the role of Heinz in Telstar.

In 2008, he made his West End debut in Ring Round the Moon. In 2009, he appeared in the RTÉ drama, Pure Mule, as Tom Stafford, the English boyfriend to main protagonist Jennifer. In 2011, Feild co-starred in Captain America: The First Avenger as James Montgomery Falsworth. The same year, he starred alongside Benedict Cumberbatch in Third Star and appeared in the BBC adaptation of Sarah Waters' The Night Watch. He appeared as Henry Nobley in Jerusha Hess's adaptation of Shannon Hale's novel Austenland in 2013. Feild filmed a role in Not Safe for Work in 2012.

Feild appeared in the BBC's The Musketeers as Marsac in 2014. From 2014 to 2016, Feild starred as Major John André in Turn: Washington's Spies on AMC. He appeared in the 2018 film adaptation of La sonrisa etrusca alongside Brian Cox, Thora Birch and Rosanna Arquette.

Feild plays automotive engineer Roy Lunn in the 2018 biographical film Ford v. Ferrari. In 2019, he starred alongside Idris Elba and Piper Perabo in the Netflix comedy series, Turn Up Charlie. He also played the recurring role of Captain Ben Adler in Netflix's Lost in Space. The following year, Feild appeared in an episode of AMC anthology series Soulmates. He appeared in the Amazon Prime Video series The Peripheral, and period romance film Prisoners of Paradise.

== Personal life ==
Feild has owned residences both in Los Angeles and in London since 2009.

He has been in a relationship with actress Neve Campbell since 2011. In March 2012, the couple confirmed that Campbell was expecting their first child together. Campbell gave birth to their son Caspian in August 2012. On 29 June 2018, Campbell announced she and Feild had adopted a son in January 2018.

== Filmography ==
=== Film ===
Year	Title	Role	Notes
2000	Railway Children	Jim	
2001	Last Orders	Young Jack	
2002	K-19: The Widowmaker	Andrei	
2002	The Intended	Hamish Winslow	
2003	The Tulse Luper Suitcases, Part 1: The Moab Story	Floris Creps / Tulse Luper	
2003	A Life in Suitcases	Tulse Luper	
2004	The Tulse Luper Suitcases, Part 2: Vaux to the Sea	Tulse Luper	
2004	The Tulse Luper Suitcases, Part 3: From Sark to the Finish	Tulse Luper	Uncredited
2006	O Jerusalem	Bobby Goldman	
2009	Telstar	Heinz Burt	
2009	Goal! 3: Taking on the World	Liam Adams	
2009	Blood: The Last Vampire	Luke	
2010	Centurion	Thax	
2010	Third Star	Miles	
2011	Captain America: The First Avenger	James Montgomery Falsworth	
2013	Austenland	Henry Nobley	
2014	Not Safe for Work	Killer	
2017	The Etruscan Smile	Ian	
2017	Professor Marston and the Wonder Women	Charles Guyette	
2019	Ford v. Ferrari	Roy Lunn	
2022	Prisoners of Paradise	Harry	
2026	Jack Ryan: Ghost War	Andrew Spear	

=== Television ===
Year	Title	Role	Notes
1999	Heartbeat	Jonno	Episode: "Kindness of Strangers"
1999	The Bill	Jamie	Episode: "Blowing it All Away"
2000	Reach for the Moon	Anthony Harris	
2000	The Railway Children	Jim	Television film
2000	Hope and Glory	Dylan Ferguson	
2001	The Life and Adventures of Nicholas Nickleby	Frank Cheeryble	Television film
2001	Perfect Strangers	Richard	
2001	Jack and the Beanstalk: The Real Story	Young Jack	
2004	Agatha Christie’s Poirot: Death on the Nile	Simon Doyle	
2004	Waking the Dead	Adam Western	Episode: "In Sight of the Lord"
2005	To the Ends of the Earth	Lieutenant Deverel	
2006	The Secret Life of Mrs Beeton	Samuel Beeton	
2006	The Ruby in the Smoke	Fred Garland	
2007	Northanger Abbey	Henry Tilney	Television film
2007	The Shadow in the North	Fred Garland	
2009	Pure Mule: The Last Weekend	Tom Stafford	
2010	Agatha Christie's Marple	Paul Osbourne	Episode: "The Pale Horse"
2011	The Night Watch	Robert Fraser	
2014	The Musketeers	Marsac	Episode "The Good Soldier"
2014–2016	Turn: Washington's Spies	Major John André	Main cast
2016	Stag	Ledge	
2018	The Romanoffs	Jack	Episodes: "House of Special Purpose", "The One That Holds Everything"
2019	Turn Up Charlie	David	Main cast
2019–2020	New Amsterdam	Dr. Zach Ligon	Recurring cast
2019–2021	Lost in Space	Captain Ben Adler	Recurring cast (season 2); Guest (season 3)
2020	Soulmates	Nathan	Main cast
2022	The Peripheral	Lev Zubov	Main cast
2025	Little Disasters	Ed	Main Cast

=== Theatre ===
Year	Title	Role	Notes
2000	Six Degrees of Separation	Rich / Ben	
2008	Ring Round the Moon	Hugo / Frederic	
2008	The Pride	Philip	
2025	A Midsummer Night's Dream	Oberon / Theseus	
2026	Relics	Jonny	
