= The Tin Princess =

1994 novel by Philip Pullman

- First edition
- Author: Philip Pullman
- Language: English
- Series: Sally Lockhart series
- Genre: Juvenile Fiction/ Action & Adventure
- Publisher: Knopf
- Publication date: March 19, 1994
- Publication place: United Kingdom
- Pages: 290
- ISBN: 0-679-84757-X
- OCLC: 59317463
- Preceded by: The Tiger in the Well

The Tin Princess (1994) is a young adult novel by the English author Philip Pullman, part of the Sally Lockhart series.

== Plot introduction ==
Sixteen-year-old Becky is about to have her life changed. A dramatic explosion is only the start of her incredible adventure. As tutor to the cockney Princess (Adelaide of The Ruby in the Smoke, whose fortunes have greatly changed) of Razkavia, a tiny kingdom in Europe, she is plunged into a turmoil of murder and intrigue.

== Characters ==
Rebecca 'Becky' Winter is the first character introduced in the book. She is hired as a language tutor for Adelaide Bevan, but quickly becomes her close friend and interpreter when she accompanies Adelaide to Razkavia. She is born in Razkavia, but has lived in England since she was three with her mother and grandmother, after her father was arrested and later died in prison in Razkavia. Despite having lived in England most of her life, she considers herself a Razkavian citizen.

Adelaide Bevan (later Princess Adelaide of Razkavia and Queen Adelaide of Razkavia) is at the center of the story. She got secretly married to Prince Rudolf of Razkavia. After the death of the old king and then her husband, she becomes the reigning queen of Razkavia.

Prince Rudolf of Razkavia (briefly King Rudolf of Razkavia) is married to Adelaide Bevan. After the death of his older brother William, he becomes crown prince of Razkavia and returns there with Adelaide, Becky and Jim Taylor. After his father's death, Rudolf gets killed during his own coronation.

Jim Taylor is a young man who offers Prince Rudolf his services as a private detective to protect him from assassination attempts. Later, he follows Rudolf to Razkavia and becomes his and Adelaide's close advisor, trying to uncover a conspiracy which threatens to dethrone the queen.

== Inspiration ==
The fictional setting was inspired by other Ruritanian romances

== TV adaptation ==
This book was expected to be made into a TV movie by the BBC to be aired in December 2009 on BBC1. However, as of April 5, 2009, production on The Tiger in the Well (the previous book in the series) had not begun, and so the future of the two remaining adaptations remains unknown.
