= Welcome to Lagos (TV series) =

BBC Two television series

- Genre: Documentary
- Directed by: Gavin Searle
- Narrated by: David Harewood
- Country of origin: United Kingdom
- Original language: English
- No. of episodes: 3

Production
- Executive producer: Andrew Palmer
- Producer: Will Anderson
- Editor: Chris King
- Production company: KEO Films

Original release
- Network: BBC Two
- Release: 15 April – 29 April 2010

Welcome to Lagos is a British three-part mini-series which originally aired on BBC Two in April 2010. Narrated by David Harewood, the observational documentary series looked at life in the slums of Lagos. The series follows denizens of Lagos slums as they go about their daily lives, from people living in the Olusosun rubbish dump to inhabitants of Makoko.

The series was produced by KEO Films. Critically acclaimed, the series won the 2011 BAFTA TV Award in the Best Factual Series category.
