= Charles II: The Power and the Passion =

- DVD cover
- Written by: Adrian Hodges
- Directed by: Joe Wright
- Starring: Rufus Sewell; Helen McCrory; Martin Turner; Ian McDiarmid
- Music by: Robert Lane
- Original language: English
- No. of series: 1
- No. of episodes: 4

Production
- Producer: Kate Harwood
- Cinematography: Ryszard Lenczewski
- Editor: Paul Tothill
- Running time: 235 min

Original release
- Network: BBC One
- Release: 16 November – 7 December 2003

Charles II: The Power and the Passion is a British television film in four episodes, broadcast on BBC One in 2003, and produced by the BBC in association with the A&E Network in the United States, which also released it in North America with heavy edits. It was produced by Kate Harwood, directed by Joe Wright and written by screenwriter Adrian Hodges, whose credits include David Copperfield and The Lost World.

== Synopsis ==
The series covers the life of Charles II – beginning just before his Restoration to the throne in 1660. He was deeply traumatised by the execution of his father in 1649, after the former's defeat in the Wars of the Three Kingdoms; it begins, however, with his penurious exile in Antwerp in 1658. The film's emphasis is on his court, and his conflicts with Parliament – essentially the same issues which led to the Civil War between his father Charles I and the House of Commons, the politics of who would succeed him – and his relationships with his family, his mistresses and his illegitimate son James, Duke of Monmouth.

The film dramatises both Charles's laziness and frivolous diversion, leaving political issues to his chancellor Sir Edward Hyde, but becoming increasingly irritated by the paternalistic way which Hyde behaves towards him. Dismissing Hyde, he takes the reins of power himself, determined that his brother should succeed him in the event of his not having any legitimate children (despite opposition to James's Catholicism), and that Royal Power not be challenged by Parliament.

The production won the British Academy Television Award for Best Drama Serial in 2004. Composer Rob Lane received a nomination for Outstanding Music Composition for a Miniseries, Movie or a Special (Dramatic Underscore) at the 32nd International Emmy Awards.

== Historical veracity ==
The production team and the writer made an attempt to make this version as close to history as the constraints of squeezing 27 years of history into 4 hours allow. The script appears to be heavily influenced by Antonia Fraser's bestselling 1979 biography Charles II. In the "Making of Charles II" Rufus Sewell states that he used Fraser's book as guide to his portrayal of the penultimate Stuart king.

There are some issues of fact which are altered or omitted in the script.

- The script implies, in a statement by George Villiers, Duke of Buckingham, that both his and Charles' father had died fighting for the Royalist cause. In fact, George Villiers, 1st Duke of Buckingham, was assassinated by a disgruntled, perhaps mentally unbalanced, navy officer named John Felton in 1628.
- Before arriving in England, at Parliament's invitation, to take up his throne, Charles II promised an amnesty "for all [his enemies] except those exempted by Parliament." After much debate, Parliament decided that all of the enemies of Charles I should be amnestied except for those who had signed the latter's death warrant. The series portrays Charles as pardoning some of his father's "murderers" after the brutal execution of a number (in fact 15). In fact, the thirteen not executed were not pardoned, but sentenced to life imprisonment.
- In one scene, shown in the British version only, Charles is seen to cast a piece of paper into a fire, in a context that heavily implies it was a marriage contract between himself and Lucy Walter, mother of his favourite, and ill-fated, natural son, James, Duke of Monmouth. Charles's alleged marriage to Lucy Walter is heavily contested by historians.
- Above, Charles kept his friend and adviser, the Duke of Buckingham, in the dark about the secret provisions of the Treaty of Dover. Buckingham was later sent to Paris to sign a sham treaty with Louis XIV. This is left out of the mini-series altogether.
- In one scene, Charles visits his mistress Lady Castlemaine in her apartments at Whitehall Palace, only to find her in bed with a young John Churchill, future Duke of Marlborough, who would become one of England's most famous military commanders and play an important part in the War of the Spanish Succession. A brief conversation ensues between the King and Churchill. In reality, Lady Castlemaine was at one of her houses and Churchill leapt from a window to avoid a scene with the King.
- Sir Edward Hyde is so addressed throughout the mini-series even though he had been made Earl of Clarendon by the King in 1661. Thus he is, from that time, properly called Clarendon as he is by historians. In the same manner, Anthony Ashley Cooper, Lord Ashley, is referred to as the Earl of Shaftesbury even though he did not obtain the title until 1674. Presumably, both names were used constantly to avoid confusing viewers unfamiliar with the period.

There are also certain omissions in the script.

- While the mini-series begins with Charles I's execution, shown in a nightmare of Charles II, the real beginning of the latter's story is in his exile in Antwerp in 1658. In fact, this was the last of many places to which Charles wandered in the 15 years of his exile, including the Scilly Isles, the Channel Island of Jersey, France, and, briefly, Scotland. The only reference to these wanderings is in the reconciliation scene between Charles and the Duke of Buckingham, when Charles says, responding to Buckingham's statement that, "It's amazing what [Parliament] will do when they feel guilty." Charles' answer, "They think money will make me forget the last twenty years. Well, they will find I have a very good memory."
- Charles tells his nephew, William of Orange, that "both of his sisters" are dead. Charles had three sisters: Mary, Elizabeth and "Minette" (Henrietta Anne). Mary, the mother of William of Orange, died in 1660. Elizabeth died during her captivity by the Parliamentarians (see Roundheads), but she is never mentioned in either version.

== Cast ==
- Rufus Sewell ... King Charles II
- Rupert Graves ... George Villiers, Duke of Buckingham
- Helen McCrory ... Barbara Villiers, Countess of Castlemaine
- Christian Coulson ... James, Duke of Monmouth
- Ian McDiarmid ... Sir Edward Hyde
- Shirley Henderson ... Catherine of Braganza
- Martin Freeman ... Lord Shaftesbury
- Charlie Creed-Miles ... James, Duke of York
- Anne-Marie Duff ... Minette (Henrietta Anne of England)
- Shaun Dingwall ... The Earl of Danby
- Emma Pierson ... Nell Gwynn
- David Bradley .... Sir Edmund Berry Godfrey
- Diana Rigg ... Queen Henrietta Maria
- Alice Patten ... Lady Frances Stewart
- Garry Cooper ... General Monck
- Thierry Perkins-Lyautey ... King Louis XIV
- Cyrille Thouvenin ... Monsieur
- Martin Turner ... Charles I
- Nick Bagnall ... Hopkins
- Sean Biggerstaff ... Henry, Duke of Gloucester
- Predrag Bjelac ... Portuguese Courtier (as Pedja Bjelac)
- Vitezslav Bouchner ... Victim #3
- Sarah Cameron ... Young girl
- Brian Caspe ... Doctor #2
- Robert East ... The Earl of Arlington
- Minja Filipovic ... Anne of Braganza
- Zuzana Hodkova ... Lady in Waiting to Queen Henrietta Maria
- Dorian Lough ... Clifford
- Eddie Marsan ... Titus Oates
- Curtis Mathew ... Victim #2
- Ryan Nelson ... Young Monmouth
- Jan Nemesovsky ... Victim #1
- Michael Pober ... Tutor
- Richard Rowlands ... Sir Roger Palmer
- Joel Sugerman ... Antwerp servant
- Jochum ten Haaf ... William of Orange
- Mélanie Thierry ... Louise de Kéroualle
- Simon Treves ... M.P.
- Peter Wight ... The Duke of Ormonde
- Andrew Woodall ... The Earl of Essex
- Simon Woods ... Captain Churchill
- James Greene ... Lord Stafford
- Pip Torrens ... Charles Hart

== Reception ==
Critic Kathryn Flett wrote that the performances in the miniseries excelled and that it "has everything the casual viewer might demand of a contemporary costume drama", but also that the elaborate hairstyling detracted from the overall work. Nancy Banks-Smith critiqued the show for its portrayal of Charles II as "wide-eyed and wounded", but praised the "luscious" scenery. The opening episode received 6.1 million views, but fell to 4.5 million by its third episode, reflecting an 18 percent audience share. The ITV program Foyle's War, airing in the same time slot received a 34 percent audience share.
