= Turn Up Charlie =

2019 British comedy TV series

- Genre: Comedy
- Created by: Idris Elba; Gary Reich
- Directed by: Tristram Shapeero; Matt Lipsey
- Starring: Idris Elba; Piper Perabo; JJ Feild; Frankie Hervey
- Composer: James Lavelle
- Country of origin: United Kingdom
- Original language: English
- No. of seasons: 1
- No. of episodes: 8

Production
- Executive producers: Idris Elba; Gary Reich; Tristram Shapeero
- Producer: Gill Isles
- Cinematography: Rob Kitzmann
- Camera setup: Single-camera
- Running time: 24–28 minutes
- Production companies: Brown Eyed Boy Productions; Green Door Pictures

Original release
- Network: Netflix
- Release: 15 March 2019

Turn Up Charlie is a British comedy television series created by Idris Elba and Gary Reich. The series stars Elba as a disc jockey who reluctantly becomes the nanny for his famous friend's daughter; Piper Perabo, JJ Feild and Frankie Hervey also star. The series premiered on 15 March 2019 on Netflix. In April 2020, the series was cancelled after one season.

== Premise ==
Turn Up Charlie follows "Charlie, a struggling DJ and eternal bachelor, who's given a final chance at success when he reluctantly becomes a nanny to his famous best friend's problem-child daughter."

== Cast and characters ==
=== Main ===
- Idris Elba as Charlie
- Piper Perabo as Sara
- JJ Feild as David
- Frankie Hervey as Gabrielle

=== Recurring ===
- Angela Griffin as Astrid
- Guz Khan as Del
- Jocelyn Jee Esien as Auntie Lydia
- Jade Anouka as Tommi
- Rina Sawayama as Layla Valentine
- Cameron King as Hunter
- Emily Carey as Bea
- Dustin Demri-Burns as Daniel Smith

== Episodes ==
No.	Title	Directed by	Written by	Original release date
1	"Episode 1"	Tristram Shapeero	Georgia Lester	15 March 2019
After reconnecting with a hugely successful friend at a wedding, struggling DJ Charlie receives an unexpected job offer.
2	"Episode 2"	Tristram Shapeero	Georgia Lester	15 March 2019
Charlie's new gig gets off to a rocky start when he and Gabrielle tag along with her parents to a party full of music industry bigwigs.
3	"Episode 3"	Tristram Shapeero	Victoria Asare-Archer & Georgia Lester	15 March 2019
While her mom holes up in the studio with Layla Valentine, Gabrielle heads to her first day of school and quickly starts racking up enemies.
4	"Episode 4"	Tristram Shapeero	Laura Neal	15 March 2019
David surprises Sara with a romantic getaway, Charlie takes a shot at remixing his hit song, and Gabs sneaks out to meet Hunter.
5	"Episode 5"	Matt Lipsey	Femi Oyeniran	15 March 2019
During a day out with Gabs, David juggles mounting career worries and a parenting first. A nervous Charlie heads to the studio to record with Sara.
6	"Episode 6"	Matt Lipsey	Laura Neal	15 March 2019
At the Latitude Festival, Sara's determined to spend time with her daughter, but Gabs and Hunter have other plans. Charlie takes Astrid on a date.
7	"Episode 7"	Matt Lipsey	Georgia Lester	15 March 2019
In sunny Ibiza, Charlie puts his friendships and career on the line when he gets caught up in the party scene and slips back into old habits.
8	"Episode 8"	Matt Lipsey	Georgia Lester	15 March 2019
A wild night and a romantic gesture stir up drama as everyone gathers for a life-changing weekend in Ibiza.

== Production ==
=== Development ===
In April 2018, Netflix gave the production a series order for a first season consisting of eight episodes. The series was created by Idris Elba and Gary Reich who executive produced the show alongside Tristram Shapeero. Directors for the series included Shapeero and Matt Lipsey. Laura Neal, Femi Oyeniran, and Victoria Asare-Archer were writers with Georgia Lester also serving as writer as well as supervising producer. Martin Joyce and Ana Garanito are co-executive producers and Gill Isles were the show's producers. Production companies involved with the series included Brown Eyed Boy Productions and Green Door Pictures. The show premiered on 15 March 2019. On 27 April 2020, Netflix cancelled the series after one season.

=== Casting ===
Alongside the initial series order announcement, it was confirmed that Idris Elba would star in the series as the titular Charlie. On 27 June 2018, it was announced that Piper Perabo, JJ Feild, and Frankie Hervey had joined the series' main cast. On 3 January 2019, it was reported that Angela Griffin, Guz Khan, Jocelyn Jee Esien, Jade Anouka, Cameron King, and Dustin Demri-Burns would join the cast.

=== Filming ===
Principal photography for the series commenced in May 2018 in the United Kingdom.

Filming locations included West London Film Studios.

== Release ==
On 3 January 2019, a series of "first look" still images from the series were released featuring Idris Elba, Piper Perabo, JJ Feild, and Frankie Hervey as Charlie, Sara, David, and Gabrielle, respectively. On 28 February 2019, the official trailer for the series was released.

== Reception ==
On the review aggregation website Rotten Tomatoes, the series holds an approval rating of 52% with an average rating of 5.26/10, based on 37 reviews. The website's critical consensus reads, "Poor writing and predictable plot twists dampen Turn Up Charlie's fun premise — but those looking for a breezy sitcom starring the perennially cool Idris Elba may find themselves tapping along to its good natured beats." Metacritic, which uses a weighted average, assigned the series a score of 48 out of 100, based on 15 critics, indicating "mixed or average reviews".
