= Not Safe for Work (film) =

- Film poster
- Directed by: Joe Johnston
- Written by: Simon Boyes; Adam Mason
- Produced by: Jason Blum
- Starring: Max Minghella; JJ Feild; Eloise Mumford; Christian Clemenson
- Cinematography: Jonathan Taylor
- Edited by: Rick Shaine
- Music by: Tyler Bates
- Production companies: Universal Pictures; Blumhouse Productions
- Distributed by: Universal Pictures
- Release date: May 9, 2014
- Running time: 74 minutes
- Country: United States
- Language: English

Not Safe for Work is a 2014 American thriller film directed by Joe Johnston and written by Simon Boyes and Adam Mason. The film stars Max Minghella, JJ Feild, Eloise Mumford, and Christian Clemenson. Minghella stars as a paralegal who witnesses an unknown man (Feild) murder a lawyer at his nearly empty workplace.

== Plot ==
John Ferguson, a whistleblower at Denning, a major pharmaceutical company, becomes disillusioned with the perceived lack of action taken against the company, murders several executives, and commits suicide as the police enter the building. Tom Miller, a paralegal assigned to the Denning case, subsequently loses confidence in the scheduled trial against Denning, as Ferguson was their star witness. Miller's boss criticizes his idealism as financially unsound, and when Miller writes an unsolicited memo on an unrelated case on the Gambizzi crime family, Alan Emmerich, one of the partners at the law firm, fires him. Roger, Miller's friend and a fellow paralegal, initially commiserates with Miller, but returns to the office in order to work late. Emmerich sends everyone else, including Miller's girlfriend, Anna, home early due to a technical problem with the firm's Internet access.

As Miller leaves the building, he sees a man in a suit set down a briefcase. A different man then picks up the suitcase and enters an elevator. Curious, Miller follows the man with the briefcase, only to see him produce a pistol from the briefcase and murder Janine, a lawyer. Panicked, Miller hides from the killer in the bathroom, where he discovers the body of a security guard. When he alerts Roger to the danger, Roger objects to Miller's plan to save Emmerich, as Roger does not believe that Emmerich would do the same for them. Regardless, Miller instructs Roger to contact the authorities as he tries to find Emmerich. Before Roger can make the call, the killer finds and strangles him. As Miller's recharging cell phone chimes, the killer realizes that there are more people left in the building than he anticipated.

Miller uses his knowledge of the building's security to evade capture and eventually discovers Emmerich in an office with a woman who Emmerich identifies as Lorraine Gambizzi. When the killer breaks into the room, Gambizzi grabs a pistol, but the killer is able to shoot her first. Not noticing Miller, who hides, the killer spares Emmerich's life and orders him to stay in the office. When the killer leaves, Miller surmises that the killer is a Gambizzi hitman sent to kill Lorraine, who was going to testify against her husband. With her death, Miller hopes the killer will leave. However, the killer attempts to gain entry into the record room, a reinforced vault that Miller and Emmerich use as a safe room. Using Miller's recharged cell phone, the killer draws Anna back to the building and taunts Miller with this fact.

The killer takes Anna hostage as soon as she arrives. Drawn out of the vault, Miller attempts to trade his access card for Anna's life, but the killer reneges on the deal, wounding Emmerich as he shoots at them. Now with access to the records, the killer starts a fire, only to realize that Miller tricked him into accepting a fake access card. Locked in the vault as the records burn, he chokes and falls unconscious. Miller enters the room to extinguish the fire, after which he realizes that the killer has recovered. As the killer beats Miller, Anna knocks him out with a fire extinguisher. Emmerich recovers the killer's pistol and fatally injures him. Before he dies, the killer whispers a code to Miller.

Curious about the killer's last words, Miller investigates further and discovers that Emmerich likely targeted Roger for assassination because of his own whistleblowing about how the law firm was intending to throw the Denning case. When he confronts Emmerich, Emmerich begs him to destroy the evidence, as Emmerich believes the pharmaceutical company to be more powerful and ruthless than any crime family. When Miller refuses, Emmerich commits suicide. As Miller and Anna leave the building, the killer's earlier accomplice, now revealed to be a police officer, alerts his superiors, and a hitman outside the building radios that he has visual confirmation of Miller.

== Cast ==
- Max Minghella as Thomas Miller
- JJ Feild as Killer
- Eloise Mumford as Anna Newton
- Christian Clemenson as Alan Z. Emmerich
- Tom Gallop as Roger Crawford
- Brandon Keener as Moyers
- Marina Black as Lorraine Gambizzi
- Eme Ikwuakor as Accomplice/Cop
- Michael Gladis as John Ferguson
- Alejandro Patiño as Fernando
- Molly Hagan as Janine
- Tim Griffin as Hitman

== Production ==
The film was announced on February 1, 2012, as a low-budget thriller, with Joe Johnston set to direct.

On February 13, 2012, it was reported that Max Minghella was in talks to star as the film's protagonist, with Eloise Mumford in talks to play his girlfriend.

On February 24, 2012, it was reported that JJ Feild, Tom Gallop and Christian Clemenson had joined the cast. Feild had previously worked with Johnston on Captain America: The First Avenger.

Principal photography began in March 2012. The film was in post-production as of August 2012.

== Release ==
On June 6, 2013, it was reported that the film would bypass a theatrical release and would instead get a VOD release at an unspecified date.

On February 27, 2014, the film was described as "long-finished" by Universal Studios chairman Donna Langley, who said that while the film would not get a theatrical release, it might get a video on-demand release. "Someday we believe there will be an opportunity to monetize that movie on a distribution platform or as a bundle [sold with other films]. It's theoretical, but we're assuming distribution is going to become more varied."

On February 3, 2014, the US poster for the film was released, along with the news of the film's (extras-free) DVD release on April 15, 2014. On February 23, 2014, a trailer for the film was released. It was then released on an identical, extras-free Blu-ray in Europe India, Japan and Brazil; and digitally in October 2014.

=== Reception ===
Martin Hafer of Influx Magazine rated it A− and wrote, "It's worth your time and is awfully good and just goes to show you that you don't need mega-stars and mega-budgets to make a good film."
