= The Tiger in the Well =

1990 Novel By Philip Pullman

- First edition
- Author: Philip Pullman
- Cover artist: Beatrice Haley
- Language: English
- Series: Sally Lockhart series
- Genre: Suspense/Adventure
- Publisher: Knopf
- Publication date: 1990
- Publication place: United Kingdom
- Pages: 448
- ISBN: 978-0-439-97780-7
- OCLC: 53394122
- Preceded by: The Shadow in the North
- Followed by: The Tin Princess

The Tiger in the Well (1990) is a book by the English author Philip Pullman.

== Plot ==
This book takes place in the autumn of 1881. Sally Lockhart has a daughter named Harriet, a nurse named Sarah-Jane and a cook named Ellie. Her friends Webster, Jim and Charles are in South America taking pictures. One day a divorce affidavit arrives at the house. Sally, who has never been married, is confused that a commission agent named Arthur Parrish claims he is her husband and Harriet's father. The affidavit says that Harriet's "father" wants custody of her. She takes it to her lawyer and gets no sympathy from him; she is only a woman after all and has no power, with the lawyer preferring to focus on the charges Parrish has used to try and claim custody of Harriet rather than whether or not Sally was actually married to him in the first place.

The scene shifts to Russian Jews getting off a boat entering England. A German Socialist journalist named Jacob Liebermann goes to the League of the Democratic Socialist Association. He meets Dan Goldberg, another Socialist journalist like himself, and Jacob tells Dan about a paralysed man called the Tzaddik who is manipulating things so the Jewish people are hurt economically and physically. He also mentions the name Parrish, which Dan recognises, as being involved.

The next day, Sally tells her friend and employee Margaret Haddow everything that has happened. Margaret goes to Parrish's office and tries to spy on him, but he realises that she is an employee of Sally's and tells her so. Sally goes to the church where she supposedly married Parrish and finds an intact record of their wedding. She also finds that the priest that supposedly married them is now retired under a cloud of suspicion. Sally decides to write to Harriet's aunt Rosa, who is married to a clergyman, so she can find out more about the priest. Meanwhile, Dan Goldberg has arranged for an employee of Parrish to be robbed. Dan looks at a notebook that was stolen from that employee and learns about the case against Sally. The next day, Sally has an argument with her lawyer on how much he is contributing to her case. After that, Sally goes out and buys a revolver. That night, someone comes into her house and takes Harriet's teddy bear.

Soon, Sally goes to ask Parrish's neighbours about him but they shut their doors to her. She finds out that the same priest that “married” the pair of them also recommended Parrish to the vicar of where he lives now. Sally goes home, bewildered, to find Rosa there waiting for her. They discuss the case and realise that Parrish wants Harriet and that Parrish has forged everything so he can have her. Parrish and Sally have meetings with their lawyers, leaving the former satisfied and the latter angry. On Sally's way home, one of Goldberg's employees tries to talk to her but she thinks that he is one of Parrish's men and threatens to shoot him. Over the weekend, she goes to Rosa's house and she and her husband Nicholas Bedwell promise to do all they can. Sally goes to a meeting with her barrister and he is very rude to her and tells her that there is no chance of winning, having not even read the papers in sufficient depth to determine that the child involved is a girl. In the courtroom, the case is over before it is begun because Sally does not show up. Custody of Harriet and all of Sally's money shifts over to Arthur Parrish. Sally plans to hide and fight back. She and Harriet change from their first boarding house in a day because of a disagreement with the landlady. Mr. Parrish steals all of Sally's money from her bank account without her knowledge and then hires an inquiry agent to find Sally. The inquiry agent goes to Sally's office and discovers a letter sent by Sally from her current boarding house. Margaret realises that he knows and sends a message for Sally to leave. Sally has to find another place for shelter but she can't find one right away. She has to sell her father's watch for only a few extra coins. Sally finally takes refuge on a park bench but a man named Morris Katz tells her to come with him to somewhere safe.

The safe place ends up being a Social Mission. Sally volunteers to work for their shelter. We see the Tzaddik and his servant Michelet arrive at their home in Spitalfields, London. The Tzaddik is told about Sally's case and he says that it is excellent that she lost. The next morning, Sally sees many social problems when she is working for the Mission. Morris Katz comes back and takes Sally to Soho where she meets Dan Goldberg. Goldberg tells Sally that Parrish is a criminal, involved with many scams including prostitution houses and exploitation of Jewish people. He also tells her about the Tzaddik and she realises that the Tzaddik is the one who wants Harriet. The Tzaddik blackmails a police officer to arrest Dan Goldberg and find Sally Lockhart.

Soon, Sally gets three letters: one from Sarah-Jane, one from Nicholas Bedwell and one from Daniel Goldberg, who had brought them all. Sarah-Jane says that policemen have been searching the house, Nicholas tells Sally that he found the priest that she was looking for, and Goldberg says that he was sorry to have missed Sally. Sally follows up on Nicholas's lead and finds the priest right where Nicholas said he was. Sally interrogates the priest but he shuts her out. Another priest tells Sally that he has noticed that the priest that married Parrish and Sally is addicted to opium, providing obvious blackmail opportunity that Sally's unknown enemies could use to make him work for them.

The next day, Margaret informs Sally that she has found a wonderful lawyer, Mr. Wentworth, by chance. Sally wants to know if he can take on her case and Margaret tells her that she has to come out of hiding first. Before Sally can reply, Goldberg comes and requests her assistance in rescuing a girl named Rebecca Meyer who knows things about the Tzaddik from being forced to go to a prostitution house. She does so successfully. They go to the Katz's house where Morris, his wife and his daughter Leah are waiting. Rebecca says that Dutch seems to be the Tzaddik's native language, he tortures his servants, he needs a monkey to help him and he uses whistles to control mobs, forcing them to attack Jewish homes and businesses in Russia. She used to be friends with one of the maidservants before the maidservant disappeared which is how she knows. Suddenly, police raid the Katz's looking for Goldberg, who is not there. They say that Goldberg is a murderer but when they leave, Katz explains that countries other than England make up false charges when the real charges have to do with politics.

Rebecca has brought a label from the Tzaddik's luggage all the way from Russia. The label belongs to a Mr. Lee and Sally realises that it is all linked to her. She decides to find Mr. Wentworth to ask him if he will be Goldberg's lawyer. Mr. Wentworth agrees but he is not sure what will happen to Sally if she continues to hide from the police.

Sally has a plan. She chops off her hair and goes to the Katz's again. She takes Harriet this time, having previously left her at the mission. The three women at the Katz's dye Sally's hair with henna. Sally says goodbye to Harriet and goes to infiltrate the Tzaddik's house.

Sally becomes a maid in the Tzaddik's house. She learns the order of things, the two sets of servants, the servers and the Tzaddik's personal servants. Later, she meets Michelet, the Tzaddik's valet who hits on her immediately. She learns that the Tzaddik has a monkey that waits on him hand and foot. Meanwhile, Margaret meets with Mr. Wentworth who is starting to realise all of the odds are against Sally. Sarah-Jane comes in and tells Margaret that they have been kicked out of their house. Mr. Katz's apprentice tells Goldberg what Sally is doing.

Late at night, Sally eavesdrops on the Tzaddik's secretary and Michelet fighting over how Harriet would be trained to replace the monkey that currently does a lot for the Tzaddik. Sally is understandably horrified. She goes back to her room but Michelet is waiting for her there. She lies and says that she didn't hear anything but Michelet is not sure. The next morning, Mr. Parrish visits the Tzaddik. Sally tries to eavesdrop but hears nothing.

Goldberg holds a meeting to solve some of the injustices being caused against the Jews. Among the people in the meeting is a gang leader named Kid Mendel who helps Goldberg keep order. Parrish finds out where Harriet is as he spreads nasty rumours about the Jews. Goldberg plans to keep a watch on Harriet and Sally but before he is done, Parrish has stolen Harriet. Goldberg gets four groups out looking for Harriet. Sally confronts the Tzaddik and realises that the Tzaddik is really Ah Ling, who she last confronted and shot over a decade ago; she caused his paralysis when her shot went through his spine. Sally tries to kill him again but she fails. She is taken to the cellar in the darkness but not before she steals a page from a ledger showing the illegal activities going on. Goldberg finds the house where Harriet is and takes a gang of teens in to get her out. They succeed, albeit one of the teens, a girl named Bridie, becomes unconscious and Dan is left behind with a bullet in his arm. Parrish has a lot of explaining to do to the police officer that covers the incident, because he is the one who shot Goldberg. Goldberg is taken into custody.

One of Goldberg's other watch-groups asks the Tzaddik's secretary where Harriet is and he realises that they don't know. He reports this to the Tzaddik and they call the police. Then the Tzaddik and Michelet go down to the cellar to see Sally. Meanwhile, two boys spring Goldberg out of the van where he is being taken to jail in and the bullet in his arm is taken out. He tells the boys who freed him to go find Harriet.

Sally interrogates the Tzaddik when he comes to see her, even though she is in no position to. She then lectures him about evil. The Tzaddik then tells Sally that Parrish has Harriet. Suddenly, a flood breaks through the cellar wall. Michelet drowns instantly but Sally, for reasons unknown to herself, tries to save the Tzaddik while the house collapses. Dan is stopping a riot when the police catch up with him. Before he is taken away, he is told that the Tzaddik's house just collapsed. The Tzaddik tells Sally a story about when a tiger was stuck in a village's well. They prayed to their gods for rain and the rain drowned the tiger. The Tzaddik is reminded of that story by the current situation but he doesn't say which of them is the tiger in the present situation. Suddenly, the Tzaddik convulses and dies.

The gang with Harriet and the unconscious Bridie stops in a place for a while. Bridie wakes up and takes care of Harriet until the owner of the place tells them to leave. The owner realises that Harriet doesn't belong with them so he tells a policeman. The other two boys get to the same place that Harriet and her entourage just left, so they are arrested for baby stealing. Sarah-Jane is standing outside of their house when Jim arrives. She explains everything that is going on to him and he starts to go to the house. Kid Mendel stops him and offers his help and his side of the story. Jim takes the advice and they go in the house and start throwing Mr. Parrish's stuff out the window. When Mr. Parrish tries to stop them, Sarah-Jane drops a chamber pot on his head. Kid Mendel hears that the house where Sally is collapsed so he and Jim go to investigate. Jim arrives just in time to see Sally rescued from the ruins. She gives him the page from the ledger that she’d hid and asks where Harriet is. She is immediately put in medical care. The two boys are released from jail because they couldn't charge them with anything. They go to where the other group is and report where Harriet is to be found. Jim goes there as soon as possible and brings Harriet home. Mr. Wentworth wins Sally's appeal with all of the new evidence. Sally decides that she wants to marry Dan Goldberg as she considers him to be her equal.

== TV adaptation ==
All four Sally Lockhart books were expected to be adapted for television by the BBC; however, The Shadow in the North aired on 30 December 2007, and since then, no information has arisen regarding an adaptation of The Tiger in the Well.

== Reception ==
In a height of admiration Publishers Weekly likened Pullman's work to Dickens by stating "this thought-provoking romp is as rich and captivating as a modern-day Dickens novel."

Kirkus Reviews added to the adulation and stated that "readers...will be enlightened with revelations that reverberate beyond the final page. A skillfully plotted, entertaining chase."
