= The Musketeers =

British television period drama series (2014–2016)

- Genre: Action drama
- Created by: Adrian Hodges
- Based on: The Three Musketeers; by Alexandre Dumas
- Starring: Tom Burke; Santiago Cabrera; Peter Capaldi; Howard Charles; Alexandra Dowling; Ryan Gage; Tamla Kari; Maimie McCoy; Luke Pasqualino; Hugo Speer; Marc Warren; Matthew McNulty; Rupert Everett
- Theme music composer: Murray Gold
- Composers: Murray Gold; Paul Englishby
- Country of origin: United Kingdom
- Original language: English
- No. of series: 3
- No. of episodes: 30 (list of episodes)

Production
- Executive producers: Adrian Hodges; Jessica Pope
- Producer: Colin Wratten
- Production location: Prague
- Running time: 54–60 minutes

Original release
- Network: BBC One
- Release: 19 January 2014 – 1 August 2016 (Note: These are the premiere and finale dates for the show airing on BBC, its origin channel. The third and final series was aired/released before the UK in multiple countries; see the episode tables and broadcast details for these dates.)

The Musketeers is a British period action drama television series based on the characters from Alexandre Dumas's 1844 novel The Three Musketeers and co-produced by BBC America and BBC Worldwide. The series follows the musketeers Athos, Aramis, and Porthos as they serve King Louis XIII and citizens of 17th-century Paris. The first episode was shown on BBC One on 19 January 2014.

It stars Tom Burke as Athos, Santiago Cabrera as Aramis, Howard Charles as Porthos, Luke Pasqualino as D'Artagnan, Tamla Kari as Constance Bonacieux, Maimie McCoy as Milady de Winter, Ryan Gage as Louis XIII, Alexandra Dowling as Queen Anne and Hugo Speer as Captain Treville. It also features Peter Capaldi as Cardinal Richelieu in Series One, Marc Warren as Comte de Rochefort in Series Two, and Rupert Everett as the Marquis de Feron in Series Three.

Jessica Pope and Adrian Hodges produced the show for the BBC. The series was largely filmed in the Czech Republic. In February 2015, it was announced that the show had been renewed for a third series, which was announced in April 2016 to be the last. The third series premiered in multiple countries first, before premiering in the UK on 28 May 2016, and concluding on 1 August 2016.

== Plot ==
In 1630s Paris, Athos, Aramis, and Porthos are a group of highly trained musketeers commanded by Captain Treville who meet D'Artagnan, a skillful farm boy with hopes of becoming a musketeer. The series follows them as they fight to protect King and country.

== Cast ==
=== Main ===
- Tom Burke as Athos
- Santiago Cabrera as Aramis
- Peter Capaldi as Cardinal Richelieu (series 1)
- Howard Charles as Porthos
- Alexandra Dowling as Queen Anne
- Ryan Gage as Louis XIII
- Tamla Kari as Constance Bonacieux
- Maimie McCoy as Milady de Winter
- Luke Pasqualino as D'Artagnan
- Hugo Speer as Captain Treville
- Marc Warren as Comte de Rochefort (series 2)
- Matthew McNulty as Lucien Grimaud (series 3)
- Rupert Everett as Marquis de Feron (series 3)

=== Recurring ===
- Bohdan Poraj as Bonacieux (series 1–2)
- Charlotte Salt as Lady Marguerite (series 2)
- Ed Stoppard as Dr Lemay (series 2)
- Will Keen as Perales (series 2)
- Thalissa Teixeira as Sylvie (series 3)
- Matt Stokoe as Captain Marcheaux (series 3)
- Andre Flynn as Gaston (series 3)
- Ross O'Hennessy as Barbier (series 3)

=== Guests ===
- Celeste Dodwell as Prostitute (2 episodes)
- Emma Hamilton as Eleanor Belgard (1 episode)
- Allan Corduner as Van Laar (2 episodes)

== Production ==
=== Conception ===
The BBC had been developing the idea of a new series based on The Three Musketeers since as far back as 2007, when the project was envisaged as a Saturday evening show to run between series of Doctor Who. The eventual production of the series was finally announced in 2012, with Adrian Hodges in charge of the project.

=== Filming ===
Paris was not considered as a filming location because over the decades, development had detracted from the grittier architecture wanted. Dublin was also considered before settling on the Czech Republic, which suffered little damage during the two world wars. Many historic buildings were intact and privately owned stately homes were rented for filming.

Filming for the series took place mainly in Doksany, 30 km NW of Prague, where a Parisian square, a number of streets, and the musketeers' garrison were constructed. A disused convent had additional sets constructed including taverns, bedrooms and mortuary.

=== Casting ===
During filming of the first series Peter Capaldi learned that he had been given the role of the Twelfth Doctor in Doctor Who. The show's executive producer Jessica Pope commented they would have to "recalibrate" plans for a prospective second series to accommodate Capaldi now being unable to reprise his role. Marc Warren joined the cast for the second series. The Musketeers was originally planned to be broadcast in 2013, but was later delayed until 2014.

== Reception ==
The Musketeers initially received mixed reviews from critics. Reviewing the third episode, Morgan Jeffery, writing for Digital Spy, praised the development of the characters, stating that there was a "real feeling of growth" and that it delivered "something a little more substantial". Den of Geek writer Rob Kemp also gave a positive review, stating that The Musketeers had "won a lot of people over with its fun and adventurous take on this well-loved story", but also wrote that some of the dramatic elements felt "shoehorned and deliberate". Overall, Kemp had hope for the series and praised the change in focus in the third episode, saying that the "time was definitely right to start to explore the characters", before going on to say that the series would have "plenty more opportunities for the Musketeers to hit their more (and hopefully, better) dramatic strides".

Upon its premiere on BBC America, Alessandra Stanley of The New York Times gave the drama a positive review, calling the series "not at all bad, just a bit old-fashioned". She also praised the updates made to the series, writing "purists may be dismayed that Mr. Hodges took so many liberties with the original plot, but purists are rarely any fun".

== Broadcast ==
=== Series overview ===
These are the premiere and finale dates for the show airing on BBC One, its origin channel. Series 2 concluded earlier in the US, and Series 3 was aired/released before the UK in multiple countries; see the episode tables and broadcast details for these dates.

Series	Episodes	Originally released	
Series	Episodes	First released	Last released
1	10	19 January 2014	30 March 2014
2	10	2 January 2015	27 March 2015
3	10	28 May 2016	1 August 2016

=== International broadcast ===
Shown on BBC One, the first series of The Musketeers was broadcast weekly at 9 pm on Sunday nights starting on 19 January 2014. The series was the highest rated drama to debut that year. For the second series, it was moved to 9 pm on Friday nights and screening began on 2 January 2015. The series premiered in the United States on 22 June 2014 on BBC America. The complete first series was "striped" on 3 August 2014 on the Australian Foxtel Cable TV channel BBC First, the day of that channel's premiere. The series started on 18 September 2014 on 'Box' Sky TV in New Zealand.

The third series premiered in Canada on Showcase Canada on 10 April 2016. The full series was made available on Netflix Latin America on 16 April 2016, and on Hulu in the United States on 14 May 2016. The series premiered in the UK on 28 May 2016. The series remains on Hulu in the US, and is available to stream on Netflix in Canada.

== Home media ==
Name	No. of episodes	DVD			Blu-ray	
Name	No. of episodes	Region 1	Region 2	Region 4	Region A	Region B
Series One	10	26 August 2014	31 March 2014	6 August 2014	26 August 2014	31 March 2014
Series Two	10	21 April 2015	6 April 2015	15 April 2015	21 April 2015	6 April 2015
Series One & Two	20	—N/a	6 April 2015	15 April 2015	—N/a	6 April 2015
Series Three	10	11 October 2016	15 August 2016	19 October 2016	11 October 2016	15 August 2016
The Complete Collection	30	—N/a	15 August 2016	19 October 2016	—N/a	15 August 2016
