= Sally Lockhart =

- Billie Piper as Sally Lockhart
- First appearance: The Ruby in the Smoke (1985)
- Last appearance: The Tin Princess (1994)
- Created by: Philip Pullman
- Portrayed by: Billie Piper

In-universe information
- Alias: Veronica Beatrice Lockhart (Legal name)
- Gender: Female
- Occupation: Businesswoman
- Spouse: Daniel Goldberg

Veronica Beatrice "Sally" Lockhart (later Goldberg) is a fictional character in a series of books by Philip Pullman.

Sally Lockhart is a dazzling 16-year-old, middle-class orphan in Victorian England whose father taught her a variety of useful things: accounting, marksmanship, finance and shooting. Sally's high intelligence opens a career path for her as a financial consultant, an extremely difficult job for a woman to obtain considering women at this point still were refused the right to vote. She has since childhood been plagued by frightening nightmares. Sally is also a very curious person.

== Character ==
Sally Lockhart is first introduced in The Ruby in the Smoke, the first of the four novels in the Sally Lockhart Quartet. The book begins in London in 1872, where Pullman states Lockhart is "sixteen or so". Physically, Lockhart is described as being "uncommonly pretty"; she has blonde hair, dark brown eyes and is "slender and pale". In the beginning, Sally is placed under the care of her father's second cousin, a widow named Caroline Rees who insists upon being called "Aunt Caroline". The two reside at Peveril Square, Islington, until Sally moves out during the beginning of The Ruby in the Smoke.

She befriends Jim Taylor, an office boy at her father's old shipping firm; Frederick Garland, a brilliant photographer; and his sister Rosa, a caring actress. Sally's high intelligence opens a career path for her as a financial consultant, an extremely difficult job for a woman to obtain considering women at this point still were refused the right to vote.

Sally Lockhart realizes she loves Frederick Garland almost too late in The Shadow in the North; they consummate their love and conceive their child hours before Frederick is killed in a fire started by associates of Axel Bellmann. Sally mourns the fact she and Fred never had a chance to marry and that their daughter, named Harriet, is illegitimate.

At the end of The Tiger in the Well, Sally realizes that Jewish-Hungarian socialist and journalist, Daniel Goldberg, is the only man who would ever measure up to Fred's bravery, understanding, and love, and that Fred would have liked Daniel very much. She decides at the end of the book that she should marry Daniel. It is unknown whether Sally Goldberg, née Lockhart, converts to Judaism on her marriage to Daniel. She also appears in the book The Tin Princess. Sally appears in all four of the books, although her appearance in The Tin Princess is only brief, and the importance of her role is considerably diminished compared to previous titles.

== The books ==
=== The Ruby in the Smoke ===
In 1872, Sally becomes involved in numerous intrigues involving the identity of her father, the British opium trade in India, and a mysterious ruby.

=== The Shadow in the North ===
It is 1878. Following a fraudulent medium's ramblings, a Scottish magician's visions, and a transport ship's disappearance, Sally finds that she must seek help from old friends, and finds herself losing all she holds dear trying to uncover the truth behind the North Star, the Steam Gun, and the mysterious businessman Axel Bellmann.

=== The Tiger in the Well ===
It is 1881. A trap has been sprung, a trap which has been in preparation for years. The barely human Tzaddik is behind this, and his demons are far greater than anything Sally Lockhart can muster. With the law, the Tzaddik's henchmen, and luck against her, she is forced to go undercover, leaving behind her family and friends as she is sucked into the well...

=== The Tin Princess ===
It is 1882. Jim finds Adelaide, a girl who went missing as a poor urchin during Sally's first encounter with danger and finds that she has married into the royal family of Razkavia, a small country near Germany. However, resentment is rife within the palace, and plots develop to dethrone the family and join Germany. Only the Eagle can stop them.

== Character histories ==
=== Jim Taylor ===
A loveable Cockney ragamuffin, Jim is an avid theatergoer who loves stories and regularly falls in love, his adult career alternating between working at a theatre and submitting self-penned plays and working as a private detective. He is courageous and outgoing and has an ability to see a person's true nature long before anyone else. He looks up to Sally and Fred. In The Shadow in the North, he breaks his leg when he falls from a window whilst trying to save Fred. While looking for Sally in the ruins of the North Star factory, he strains his leg too much and causes him to have a limp for the rest of his life, although he is still physically capable in a fight. In The Tin Princess, he accompanies the long-lost Adelaide and her new husband to her husband's kingdom, with Jim eventually marrying Adelaide after her husband is killed and Adelaide removed from the throne.

Jim is in all of the books, although his appearance in The Tiger in the Well is only brief as he was away on a trip with Webster Garland for much of the novel.

Jim was played by Matt Smith in the TV series.

=== Frederick Garland ===
A photographer with an imaginative streak and a wonderful personality. Although he has feelings for Sally, they almost always argue, Sally torn between her admiration for his strength and compassion and her frustration at his occasionally childish behavior, but their friendship is still strong. Although they accept their feelings for each other, he dies in a fire caused by Axel Bellmann midway through The Shadow in the North, causing Sally to murder Bellmann. He is an important character as he supports Sally throughout almost all of the book 'Ruby In The Smoke' and fight a villainous 'Mr Berry' to protect their friends.

Sally's pain for most of The Shadow in the North and The Tiger in the Well revolves around the fact that had Fred survived the fire, the couple would have married and brought up their daughter, Harriet Rosa Lockhart, together.

Frederick appears in The Ruby in the Smoke and The Shadow in the North.

=== Ah Ling/Hendrik van Eeden/Tzaddik ===
A ruthless pirate and murderer, of Dutch/Chinese descent, who illegally ships low-quality opium to Europe from the East. Sally thought that she killed him in The Ruby in the Smoke, but did not. As we later discover, her bullet pierced his spinal cord, and he was paralyzed. In The Tiger in the Well, he has assumed the name "Tzaddik" and, amongst other organized criminal activities, runs a prostitution ring throughout Europe. He also has a mysterious tiny servant, rumoured to be a dybbuk, an evil spirit with its origins in Jewish mythology, although it is later revealed to be a monkey. The dybbuk is killed by the Tzaddik's valet, Michelet; he had been intending to abduct Harriet to take the monkey's place as his personal servant as part of his revenge against Sally, but the plan fell through. He himself is killed in the Blackbourne River Flood.

Ah Ling/Hendrik van Eeden/Tzaddik is in The Ruby in the Smoke and The Tiger in the Well.

=== Theophilus 'Trembler' Molloy ===
An ex-pickpocket, Trembler works for the Garlands in The Ruby in the Smoke and is characteristically nervous, hence his nickname. He takes to Adelaide very quickly and loves her like a daughter. The stereographic picture of Trembler with Adelaide on his knee is a clue to the true identity of the 'Cockney Queen' in "The Tin Princess".

Trembler and Mrs. Molloy are one of Sally's ports of call in The Tiger in the Well as they now own a boarding house, and she arranges to hide with them after running from her court appearance with Harriet.

Trembler is not seen or mentioned in the BBC adaptations.

He is an amazing character and helps Sally greatly even helping her buy a gun (after her gun that her deceased 'Father' had given her was stolen by a thief).

=== Rosa Bedwell/Garland ===
Fred's sister. She was a small-time actress, and later married a clergyman, Nicholas Bedwell, the twin brother of Matthew Bedwell, the unfortunate opium-addicted sailor from The Ruby in the Smoke. She and Reverend Bedwell went on to have two children, May and Matthew Bedwell. She helps Sally and Harriet (Sally's daughter, Rosa's niece) through a court case in The Tiger in the Well.

Rosa and her brother, Fred, were originally disowned by their parents for taking up career choices that their parents did not agree with and were supported by their father's brother, Webster Garland. Rosa was accepted by her parents after giving up the stage and marrying Reverend Bedwell. Although she loves her husband, Rosa still longs for the stage and puts on parish pageants and pastorals (The Tiger in the Well).

=== Becky Winter ===
Born in Razkavia, Becky is employed by a man called Herr Strauss to teach Miss Bevan German. After the first lesson she discovers the danger that Prince Rudolf (a.k.a. Herr Strauss) is in. She befriends Jim Taylor (a consulting detective), Sally Goldberg (a financial consultant), Prince Rudolf (the crown prince of Razkavia), and his Cockney wife Adelaide Bevan (an old friend of Jim and Sally's).

=== Adelaide Bevan ===
East end orphan who is a servant of Mrs. Holland in The Ruby in the Smoke. Once Mrs. Holland dies, she is still not found until the later books. She appears in The Tin Princess as Crown Princess and later Queen of Razkavia. She later agrees to marry Jim after political strife forces her to abdicate her throne, with her friend Becky suggesting that Adelaide could become an actress.

== TV adaptation ==
The first two novels were adapted into TV movies by BBC Drama and broadcast on BBC One in the UK, with Billie Piper cast in the role of Sally Lockhart. The first story, The Ruby in the Smoke, aired on 27 December 2006. The second, The Shadow in the North, aired on 30 December 2007.

Although all four novels were expected to be adapted into TV movies, to date there has been no indication of plans to follow up with productions of the final two novels. In the United States, the first two stories aired as part of the Masterpiece Mystery! series.
