= The Shadow in the North =

1986 book by Philip Pullman

- First edition
- Author: Philip Pullman
- Language: English
- Series: Sally Lockhart series
- Publisher: Oxford University Press
- Publication date: 1986
- Publication place: United Kingdom
- Pages: 288
- ISBN: 0-192-71548-8
- OCLC: 59317478
- Preceded by: The Ruby in the Smoke
- Followed by: The Tiger in the Well

The Shadow in the North is a 1986 book by the English author Philip Pullman. It was originally published as The Shadow in the Plate.

== Plot ==
This second Sally Lockhart mystery takes place in late 1878, six years after the events of The Ruby in the Smoke. A Miss Walsh walks into the offices of Sally Lockhart's office (Sally is now working as a financial consultant) about some poor business advice Sally gave her; as a result Miss Walsh has lost her life savings. Sally vows to get the money back and investigate Anglo-Baltic, the company Miss Walsh lost all her money from. We also learn that Sally has a huge but lovable black dog called Chaka and that Frederick Garland (Sally's friend from The Ruby in the Smoke) is in love with Sally but that she is unsure of her feelings and so continuously refuses to decide on whether to marry him. Sally's friend Jim Taylor (now working as a stagehand in a local theatre) helps stage magician Alistair Mackinnon escape two men Mackinnon is certain plan to kill him. Jim takes Mackinnon to Frederick and Frederick's uncle Webster at their photography shop/private investigations office in Burton Street where Mackinnon proves to Jim, Webster and Frederick that he has spiritual abilities (he can see things having to do with an object by touching it) and tells them of a murder he saw by touching a man's cigar case. Mackinnon tells them that he believes that the man knows that he (Mackinnon) knows about the murder, and is therefore terrified for his life. Jim and Frederick go to a spiritualist seance as part of their work as private detectives. The seance involves the table shaking from side to side and objects being thrown across the room; the medium (a Mrs. Nellie Budd) also has trance during which she says things that connect to a mysterious business tied up to Anglo-Baltic called North Star. Frederick manages to get a photograph of Nellie's arms during the seance. Later, Frederick tells Sally what he has learnt. She tells him what she knows about the former owner of Anglo-Baltic and current owner of North Star, Axel Bellmann. Sally suspects that Bellman has manufactured Anglo-Baltic's collapse to fund North Star; she believes him to be very vicious.

Later that week, Mackinnon is to perform at a charity event. He asks Frederick to come with him for protection. Frederick asks his aristocratic friend Charles to come with him as Charles can tell Frederick who the people at the event are. While performing, Mackinnon sees the man he believes to be after him in the audience. He gets the message to Frederick leading Frederick to find out that this man is Axel Bellmann. Frederick and Charles also come across Lord Wytham and his ethereally beautiful daughter Lady Mary. Mackinnon disappears, much to Frederick and Charles's annoyance. At Sally's office the next morning, Mr. Windlesham, an employee of Bellmann, tries to intimidate her and so stop her investigations into Bellmann but she refuses. In the meantime, we learn that Bellmann has made a deal with the almost-bankrupt Lord Wytham: if Bellmann marries Lady Mary Wytham, Lord Wytham's debts will be paid off. Wytham, repulsed by the deal, sees no option but to accept: if he does not, he will go to debtors' prison. Meanwhile, Frederick goes to Nellie to show her his photograph from the seance: it shows her using fake arms as well as wires to cause the table to move and the objects to be thrown. She responds cheerfully, but agrees to tell him more about her trances (which she claims are genuine). She cannot remember what happens during them; she has had them since she was young; she used to have them while her identical twin sister Jessie Saxon never did. Frederick tells her what she said during her trance. She says it sounds like nonsense and is surprised that he takes it seriously. Sally visits Bellmann and orders him to pay her Miss Walsh's lost money but he refuses. Unfortunately for Nellie, Sally drops Nellie's business card in Bellmann's office. Jim goes to look for Mackinnon and meets a woman called Isabel Meredith. She tells Jim that she is desperately in love in Mackinnon but knows he cannot be with her. She also tells Jim where Mackinnon is. Meanwhile, Charles discovers that Bellmann and Lady Mary Wytham are engaged. When investigating, Jim meets Lady Mary and immediately falls in love with her. She tells him that she cannot marry Bellmann and he gives her his card. Later, Isabel's room is ransacked by Bellmann's henchmen. Frightened, she tells them where Mackinnon will be performing but Frederick, Sally and Jim are able to save him by allowing him to get away from that venue so he is not harmed. Before he escapes, Sally demands he tell her the real reason Bellmann is after him. He tells her that he is Nellie Budd's son by Lord Wytham but then runs away from her (as well as the henchmen) before she can find out more. Isabel comes to stay in Burton Street.

Frederick goes to see Nellie again but finds she has been attacked. She is taken to a hospital for treatment; there is doubt over whether she will survive. Windlesham pays a hitman to kill Sally. Meanwhile, Sally finds out that North Star is a weapons company that plans to build a massive "Steam Gun" capable of shooting thousands of bullets at once. Frederick learns how the Steam Gun works and comes across Nellie's sister Jessie in the north of England. He tells Jessie about Nellie's injury and Jessie tells him that Mackinnon is not Nellie's son but Nellie's lover. Jessie decides to go to Nellie. Frederick learns from a hostel owner that Mackinnon is married to Lady Mary Wytham. It becomes clear that Bellmann knows this and that is why Bellmann is trying to kill Mackinnon. It becomes clear that Nellie was not Mackinnon's lover and that it was Nellie who made Mackinnon's and Lady Mary's marriage possible. Windlesham's hitman tries to kill Sally but, unbeknownst to him, the woman he tries to kill is really Isabel and his knife gets stuck in her underclothing. He kills Chaka instead (and is himself killed) and Sally is devastated by Chaka's loss. Next day, Sally goes into her office to find it ransacked. Neither her landlord nor the police are helpful. Sally asks Frederick to help; Frederick and Jim manage to retrieve the stolen files from Bellmann's house. Sally realises that the Steam Gun is for use against one's own population. Jim (now aware of Lady Mary's marriage) meets Lady Mary in Hyde Park; they talk and, on impulse, briefly kiss. He advises her to make her marriage to Mackinnon public and she tells him where Mackinnon is hiding. Sally tells Isabel that Mackinnon is married, leaving Isabel quietly devastated. Jim and Frederick go to see Mackinnon and find him being attacked by Bellmann's henchmen. Jim and Frederick fight, with a moment of instrumental help from Mackinnon, against the henchmen, eventually knocking them out. They tie them up and send them in a cab to a police station. Mackinnon comes back to Burton Street. After everyone but Sally and Frederick are left alone together (with a brief interruption). Sally tells Frederick that she loves him and takes him upstairs whispering "Not a word - not a word." They sleep together, and afterwards Sally lets Frederick ask her to marry him, and agrees. Meanwhile, Windlesham and Bellmann have set fire to the building. Jim smells it and warns everyone else. Everyone climbs out of the window (Jim falls and breaks his leg) apart from Isabel who refuses to leave her room. Frederick climbs back up to save her but she refuses to move and the ceiling collapses, killing them both.

After Frederick's body is found after the fire, Sally walks around in a daze. Unknowingly, she goes to the North Star headquarters and tells Bellmann that she is there to see him. Back in London, despite Jim's broken leg, he manages to walk to where Mackinnon is staying. Mackinnon sees where Sally is using his psychic powers and Jim makes him come to the North Star headquarters. Back at the North Star, Sally tells Bellmann that she loved Frederick and that Bellmann killed him. Bellmann tells Sally that he wants power and that he believes the Steam Gun will give it to him. He asks her to marry him, telling her that he thinks her a better match for him than Lady Mary would have been. At that moment, Mackinnon comes in to bring Sally to Jim. Sally tells Mackinnon to wait before agreeing to marry Bellmann in exchange for the money Miss Walsh lost from the collapse of Anglo-Baltic. Bellmann gives the money to Sally who tells Mackinnon to take it to Miss Walsh. Mackinnon takes the money to Jim and Jim suspects Sally has a plan. At Sally's request, Bellmann takes her to see the Steam Gun. While chiding Bellmann for his failure to understand people like Frederick, Sally sets the Steam Gun off, killing Bellmann. Sally survives and is rescued by Jim and Mackinnon from the rubble. Bellmann's death is reported as a tragic accident; Miss Walsh gets her money and insists in investing it in Garland & Lockhart (the photography firm Sally helped set up); it transpires that Jim will walk with a limp for the rest of his life thanks to his efforts to rescue Sally when his leg was broken; Nellie Budd recovers and decides to go back to the north with Jessie; and Mackinnon and Lady Mary leave England to go to America. In the spring of the next year, Charles shows Sally, Webster and Jim a possible new location for Garland & Lockhart after the fire. It is beautiful and spacious with a large orchard; the only drawback being that it is apparently haunted. They decide to take it and Charles gives Sally a photograph he had taken near the beginning of the novel of Frederick. The novel closes with Sally's announcement that she is pregnant with Frederick's child.

== TV adaptation ==
A BBC TV movie adaptation starring Billie Piper as Sally Lockhart, JJ Feild as Fred Garland, Jared Harris as Axel Bellmann and Matt Smith as Jim Taylor. It was partly filmed in Kent at The Historic Dockyard Chatham.

It was broadcast in the UK on 30 December 2007 on BBC1. It also aired in the United States on the PBS station Masterpiece Mystery! under the title The Sally Lockhart Mysteries: The Shadow in the North.

All four Sally Lockhart books were expected to be adapted for television; however, as of March 2014, no information has arisen regarding an adaptation of the third and fourth books.

== Allusions to history ==
The character of Hopkinson/Nordenfels seems to be based on Swedish inventor Thorsten Nordenfelt, particularly his move from Sweden to England, his investment in British railway technology and the development of the Nordenfelt gun which all have parallels in the book. Perhaps coincidentally, there were also armoured trains of Poland. There are also significant similarities between the character of Axel Bellmann and Swedish industrialist Axel Wenner-Gren - not least, nationality, millionaire status, connection to industrialisation and first name. It is likely Wenner-Gren was a Nazi agent and sympathiser.
