= Avishai Milshtein =

- אבישי מילשטיין
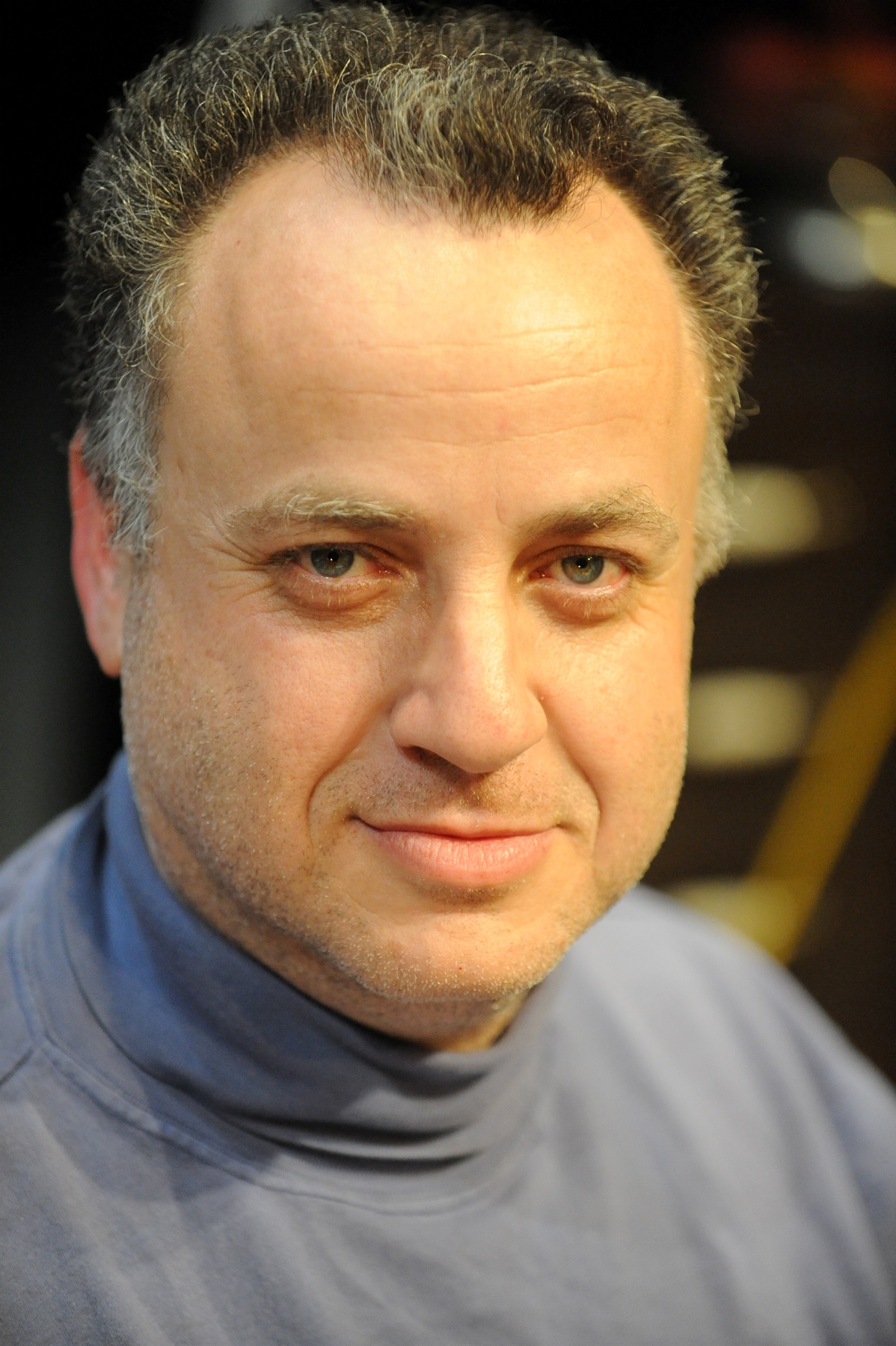
- Avishai Milstein
- Born: 27 April 1964; Petah Tikva
- Education: LMU Munich
- Occupations: playwright, theatre director, actor, translator, and dramaturg

Avishai Milshtein (Hebrew: אבישי מילשטיין; born 1964) is an Israeli playwright, theatre director, actor, translator, and dramaturg.

== Biography ==
Avishai Milshtein grew up in Ramat Gan. He is the only child of two Polish-born parents who were Holocaust survivors.

He began acting in plays at the age of ten at the Eretz Oz Theater. He appeared in children's plays such as Heidi, Hannah's Sabbath Dress, Tom Sawyer, and Hasamba (playing the role of Yaron Zahavi). He also had small roles in the film Noa at 17 (directed by Isaac "Zepel" Yeshurun, 1982). He graduated from the Thelma Yellin High School of the Arts, majoring in theater (1978–1982). While a student at Thelma Yellin, he performed in the school's production of The Threepenny Opera by Brecht and Weill. Impressed by the work, Milstein decided to study the German language. He studied at the Goethe-Institut in Tel Aviv and Düsseldorf (1981–1985).

=== Career ===
At the age of sixteen, in 1980, Milstein directed for the first time a work he had written - The Sparrow, an opera composed by Dori Parnes (then seventeen); a co-production between Thelma Yellin and Beit Lessin Theater, May 1980. In the Israel Defense Forces, he served as a radio operator in the Signal Corps, Central Command.

His play Then As Death (Az Kamavet), directed by Shoshana Riseman, was presented at the Acco Festival of Alternative Israeli Theatre in 1987 and received an honorable mention for both the play and the production. He studied theater, literature, and German philology at LMU Munich, Germany (1986–1990). Starting in 2003, he taught dramatic writing at the University of Hildesheim, Germany, and taught at the Berlin University of the Arts. Founder and head of the Theater Department at Alliance High School, Tel Aviv (1997–2001).

Milstein founded the Notzar Theater, together with Dalit Milstein (no family relation), and served as its artistic director and as the director of the Association for the Advancement of Theater in Jaffa (1991–2004). The Notzar Theater's first production was The War Plays by Edward Bond. The production was staged at the Acco Festival in October 1992 and won awards for design and guest performance. In 1997, Milstein directed the Israeli premiere of the classic play Penthesilea by Heinrich von Kleist, produced by the Notzar Theater. The production was later presented at the Trailblazers Festival in Aachen, Germany.

His first play to be staged in a repertory theater was Piwnica, which he also directed at Habima Theatre in 1994. He served as a dramaturg for the Habima Theatre from 1990 to 1995. Guest dramaturg for the production of The Merchant of Venice, directed by Hanan Snir, at the Deutsches Nationaltheater und Staatskapelle Weimar in Weimar (1995) and at the Israel Festival in Jerusalem (1996). Dramaturg and artistic consultant for the Beit Lessin Theater since 1995. In 1996, he received the America-Israel Cultural Foundation directing Scholarship.

In 2001, he was one of the three directors of the Israeli TV Sitcom "Shachar". In 2012, he performed in the play “Maxi and I”, which was staged at the Beit Lessin Theatre. In 2023, he played in the TV series "Berlin Blues", produced by yes.

Founder and artistic director of the “Curtain Opens” Festival for Young Israeli Playwriting at Beit Lessin Theatre since 2000, in which 300 plays were staged over its first 20 years. He initiated “IsraDrama – A Spotlight on Israeli Drama”, a collaboration between The Hanoch Levin Institute of Israeli Drama, the Ministry of Foreign Affairs, and the Ministry of Culture. He served as the festival's artistic director in 2005, 2010, and 2012. In 2005, he founded the “Opening Stage” Festival for Young Israeli Playwriting at Beit Lessin Theatre. In 2012, he founded and managed the Playwriting School of Beit Lessin Theatre in collaboration with Stage Center.

In 2007, he directed “Murder” by Hanoch Levin as part of the F.I.N.D. Festival at the Schaubühne Theatre, Berlin. In 2008, he directed “Mein Kampf” by George Tabori at the Theater Freiburg, Germany, in collaboration with the E-Werk Museum. The play tells the story of a Jew who mentors the young Hitler and inspires him to write Mein Kampf. He served as co-artistic director (together with Jan Linders) of the project “Familienbande” (“Family Ties”), a joint initiative between Beit Lessin Theatre, Tel Aviv, and the Heidelberg Municipal Theatre, Germany. The project presented six bi-national productions beginning in May 2009. Milstein directed “The Banality of Love” by Savyon Liebrecht at Beit Lessin Theatre in January 2009. The production won the 2010 Israeli Theatre Award for Best Original Play of the Year. It opened the "Stuckemarkt" festival, Heidelberg, in 2010 and was later hosted by the Theater Freiburg in May of that year. In 2011, he directed “The Merchant of Venice” by Shakespeare at the Theater Freiburg, Germany, with Doron Tavori in the lead role. In 2015, Beit Lessin Theatre premiered his play “Don’t Forget to Love – Love Hurts.” The production is based on 35 interviews with Israeli and German mixed couples, telling their stories 70 years after Auschwitz and exactly 50 years after the signing of diplomatic relations between Germany and Israel. The play was staged as a co-production with the Badisches Staatstheater Karlsruhe. The play Auerbach! by Avishai Milstein was named Play of the Year for 2026 by the journal Theater heute, jointly with To My Little Boy by Caren Jeß.

== Personal life ==
He is married to Marit Joffe-Milstein, a former actress. They live in Tel Aviv and have three children.

== Book ==
Editor and co-chief contributor of the book Israeli drama: synopses of selected Hebrew plays for distribution through Israel's official cultural delegations and to international festival directors. The project was initiated and published by Kashtum — the Department of Cultural and Scientific Relations of the Israeli Ministry of Foreign Affairs — in 2000; a revised edition edited by him was published in 2009.

== Prizes and Awards ==
- 1987 - Special mention for the Best Play for “Then As Death”, Acco Festival of Alternative Israeli Theatre.
- 1992 - Design prize for “War Plays”, Acco Festival of Alternative Israeli Theatre.
- 1994 - The Ben Nachum Prize for the Hebrew version of Bond’s “War Plays”.
- 2001 - Simon Gardiner Playwright's Award for "The Border and the Return".
- 2010 - Israeli Theatre Award: best director of a new Israeli play, for "The Banality of Love" by Savyon Liebrecht; The Beit Lessin Theater.
- 2019 - Ben Nahum translator's prize for Oslo by J. T. Rogers.
- Ben Nahum translator's prize for Oslo

== Playwright ==
- 1980 - “The Sparrow”, Beit Lessin Theater.
- 1984 - “The Bondage”, Tsavta, Tel-Aviv.
- 1987 - “Then As Death”, Acco Festival of Alternative Israeli Theatre. (special prize for the best play).
- 1987 - “Around the World in 80 Days”, Tzavta.
- 1991 - “Ma’ayan”, an opera (Music: Dori Parnes), Nissan Nativ Acting Studio.
- 1994 - “Piwnica”, (The Beer Cellar), Habima Theatre.
- 1996 - “My Affair with Brecht”, Haifa Theatre.
- 1998 - “To Be Or Not To Be”, (co-author: Roni Pinkovitch), Haifa Theatre.
- 2000 - “The Border and the Return”, Notzar Theatre, Tel-Aviv; Reading during the Australian National Playwrights’ Conference, Dir.: Sue Rider, Canberra, Australia, 2001; Reading at the Act-in theatre festival in Luxembourg, November 2001.
- 2008 - "A Hole in the Clouds", commissioned by the "Maxim-Gorki-Theater", Berlin; Staged reading at the IsraDrama Festival.
- 2015 - Love Hurts; Co-Production of Badisches Staatstheater Karlsruhe & Beit-Lessin, Tel-Aviv.
- 2021 - Oedipus, after Sophocles; Notzar Theatre, Bat-Yam.
- 2023 - The Peacemaker (Die Freidensstifterin); Staatstheater Kassel. (Guest performances in Berlin, Katowice, Hessian Theatre Days – Giessen).
- 2024 - Shame Fall Fugue; Staged reading: Munich Kammerspiele, Munich. (Reprinted in Theater der Zeit).
- 2025 - Dualidarity (Dualidarität); Heimathafen Berlin; (Guest performances in Berlin, Frankfurt am Main).

== Director ==
- 1990 - “All the Dreams, All the Expectations … “, 45 years of the Cameri Theatre, a review, Cameri Theatre, Tel-Aviv.
- 1991 - “Ma’ayan”, an opera (Music: Dori Parnes), Nissan Nativ Acting Studio.
- 1992 - “The War Plays, parts I & II”, by Edward Bond, Notzar Theatre at the Acco Festival of Alternative Israeli Theatre, (special prize for design, special prize for the Hebrew version).
- 1992 - “Napoleon – Dead or Alive!”, by Nissim Aloni, Nissan Nativ Acting Studio.
- 1992 - “Good”, by C. P. Taylor, Nissan Nativ Acting Studio, Jerusalem.
- 1993 - “Ba’al”, by Bertolt Brecht, Nissan Nativ Acting Studio, Jerusalem.
- 1994 - “Piwnica”, own play, Habimah Theatre.
- 1994 - “The Tin-Can People”, by Edward Bond, Notzar Theatre at the Reading Power Station, Tel-Aviv.
- 1997 - “Penthesilea”, by Heinrich von Kleist, Notzar Theatre, World premiere: Aachen, Germany, “Schrittmacher-Festival”; Israeli version.
- 2000 - “Collected Stories”, by Donald Margulies, Beit Lessin.
- 2002 - "A Place" by Shulamit Lapid; Israeli festival of one-act plays; Tzavta, Tel-Aviv.
- 2003 - "Rhinos" by Eugène Ionesco; Notzar Theater, Tel-Aviv.
- 2004 - "Between Us" by Joe Hortua; Beersheba Theater.
- 2004 - "A Weekend at Caesaria" by Goren Agmon; Beit-Lessin, Tel-Aviv.
- 2004 - "A Paper Panther" by Amir Maman; staged reading at Open Stage Festival, Beit-Lessin, Tel-Aviv.(prize of the best production).
- 2005 - "4. Of November" by Idan Zilberstein; the Israeli festival of one-act plays, Tzavta, Tel-Aviv.
- 2007 - "One Hundred" by Yigael Sachs; the Cameri theater, Tel-Aviv.
- 2009 - "The Banality of Love" by Savyon Liebrecht; Beit-lessin, Tel-Aviv. Winner of the Israeli Theatre Award, 2009, best production of an Israeli new play, 2010. (Opened the "Stuckemarkt" festival, Heidelberg, April 2009, and toured the Theater Freiburg.)
- 2009 - "Night-blind" by Dora von Stockert-Meynert; Theater Ulm, Germany.
- 2010 - "Medicament" by Maya Scheye; the municipal theater of Heidelberg, Germany (a co-production of Beit-Lessin, Tel-Aviv & Heidelberg municipal theater, "Familienbande").
- 2010 - "Happy Ending" by Iddo Netanyahu; the Beit-Lessin theater, Tel-Aviv ("Open Stage festival)
- 2011 - "My Father" by Kristo Šagor; staged reading at the "Open Stage" Festival; Co-Production: Beit-Lessin 7 Heidelberg Municipal theater (Familienbande)".
- 2011 - "The Merchant of Venice" by Shakespeare; Theater Freiburg, Germany, March 2011 (closes the theater days of Baden-Württemberg, Karlsruhe).
- 2013 - "The Orchard" by Josef Bar-Josef; Beit-Lessin, Tel-Aviv.
- 2015 - "Love Hurts", own play; Badisches Staatstheater Karlsruhe & Beit-Lessin Theatre, Tel-Aviv.
- 2015 - "The Revisionist" by Jesse Eisenberg; Beit-Lessin, Tel-Aviv.
- 2016 - Philoktet by Heiner Müller; Jerusalem Khan Theatre.
- 2016 - The Oresteia by Aeschylus; Notzar Theatre, Bat-Yam.
- 2017 - The Snow-Burnt Village (Das schneeverbrannte Dorf) by Sybille Clauss-Schleicher; Theater Ulm, Oktober.
- 2018 - Mother Teresa Is Dead by Helen Edmundson; Haifa Theatre.
- 2020 - The Tin Can People, by Edward Bond, Notzar Theatre.
- 2021 - Oedipus, after Sophocles; Notzar Theatre, Bat-Yam.
