= Kristo Šagor =

German writer (born 1976)

Kristo Šagor (born 16 March 1976) is a German playwright and director.

He has received numerous awards, and his plays Dreier ohne Simone, FSK 16 and Trüffelschweine are now among the most frequently performed plays in German-speaking countries.

== Early life and lower education ==
Kristo Šagor was born on 16 March 1976, in Stadtoldendorf in the district of Holzminden, Lower Saxony, but grew up in a neighbourhood of Lübeck. His mother was a teacher and came from the Federal Republic of Germany. His father was a hotel manager and hotel-management school teacher and came from Croatia, then part of Yugoslavia, where the two had met in 1973 in the port city of Dubrovnik. His parents had been living together in Germany since 1976.

== Higher education and career ==
After graduating from Ernestinenschule in Lübeck and completing his civilian service at the Travetal elderly care center, he moved to Berlin in 1996 to study modern German literature, theater studies and linguistics at the Free University of Berlin.

From 1996 to 1999, he was involved in the student theater TREKJOP, for which his play Dreier ohne Simone was created. Šagor directed the play himself in 1999 and played one of the three boys: Sven, Andreas and Kai are waiting to be interrogated in the principal's anteroom at their school, as they are all three suspected of having raped their classmate Simone on the school trip that has just ended. A petty war ensues based on insinuations, jealousy and desire. With Dreier ohne Simone, Šagor found his publisher, Kiepenheuer Bühnenvertriebs-GmbH, Berlin. The play has been performed at numerous professional youth theaters, including abroad.

In 1999, Šagor studied for a year at Trinity College in Dublin (Ireland). He represented Germany at the European Festival of Young Playwrights (Interplay Europe) 2000 in Warsaw and at the World Festival of Young Playwrights – World Interplay 2001 in Townsville (Australia). His final breakthrough as an author came in 2000 with Durstige Vögel at the Schauspielhaus Bochum in Bochum.

In 2002, he made his debut as a director with a production of the same play at the Münchner Volkstheater (Munich People's Theater) in Munich. From 2002 to 2004, he was in-house author at the Theater Bremen in Bremen. This was followed by directing work at numerous theaters in Germany, including the world premieres of Heldenhaft by Katharina Schlender at the Markgrafentheater Erlangen (2004) in Erlangen, Sommer mit Mädchen by Kai Hensel in Braunschweig (2004) and Traumpaar by Zoran Drvenkar at the Theater an der Parkaue in Berlin (2006).

In the 2008/2009 season, Šagor was artistic director of the Theater unter Tage at the Schauspielhaus Bochum. From October 2008 to the end of February 2009, he lived on the stage of the Theater unter Tage and realized the project Neue Heimat. Living Underground.

== Personal life ==
Šagor lives in Berlin.

== Accolades ==
In 2001, Šagor received the audience award of the Heidelberger Stückemarkt and the Hallenser Dramatikerpreis for his play Unbeleckt, as well as the funds of the Friedrich-Schiller-Gedächtnispreis of the state of Baden-Württemberg. One year later, his play Federn lassen was rewarded with the prize of the Landesbühnengruppe of the Deutscher Bühnenverein. Moreover, his play Fremdeln was nominated for the German youth theatre prize the same year. Additionally, he received the second-author prize at the fifth Dutch–German children's and youth theater festival Kaas & Kappes in Duisburg in 2003, to be awarded with the author price for his play Trüffelschweine only two years later.

The same year, the Frankfurter Autorenstiftung honored his play Ja with the children's theatre prize. The staging of his own play FSK 16 at Schnawwl, the youth theatre of Mannheim National Theatre was invited to the 8. German children's and youth theatre meeting Augenblick mal in Berlin. In 2007, he staged the premiere of Genannt Gospodin from Philipp Löhle at the Schauspielhaus Bochum. The same play was also staged at the theatre festival Mülheim one year later.

In 2007, he won the German theatre prize Der Faust for his play Törless at the Deutsches Schauspielhaus in Hamburg in the category of the best direction of the children's and youth theatre.

His play Patrick's Trick was honored not only with the promotion prize of the children's theatre of Berlin in 2013, but also with the youth theatre prize of Baden-Württemberg in 2014. That year, his play was nominated for the German Children's Theatre Prize too.

In 2016, the drama critics of the ZITTY of Berlin chose their favorite production, voting 2 Uhr 14, composed by David Paquet in the direction of Kristo Šagor from second place.

The play Ich liebe dich, produced for Ulrike Günther at the Schauburg in Munich, presented David Benito Garcia and Anne Bontemps in the main roles, resulting in Šagor being awarded with the Mülheimer KinderStückePreis by the Youth jury in 2019.

== Works ==
- Dreier ohne Simone, (1999), Theater Trekjop, Berlin
- Durstige Vögel, (2000), Schauspielhaus Bochum
- Fremdeln, (2001) Moks, Bremen Theater
- Adam Komma Eva, (2002), Staatstheater Braunschweig
- Unbeleckt, (2002), Theater & Orchester Heidelberg
- FSK 16, (2003), Moks, Bremen Theater
- Werther. Sprache der Liebe, (2003), Nationaltheater Weimar
- Federn lassen, (2003), Schleswig-Holsteinisches Landestheater
- Die nächste Unschuld, (2003), Nationaltheater Weimar
- Trüffelschweine, (2004), Moks, Bremer Theater
- Tell, (2005), Nationaltheater Mannheim
- Hautkopf, (2005), Neuköllner Oper, Berlin
- Ja, (2006), Schnawwl, Nationaltheater Mannheim
- Bevor wir gehen, (2008), Schauspielhaus Bochum
- Keinem Keiner, (2009), Schauspielhaus Wien/Konservatorium Wien
- Der eigene Raum, (2008), Schauspielhaus Bochum
- Alle kriegen dick und werden Kinder, (2009), Schauspiel Hannover
- Gonzo, (2011), Deutsches Schauspielhaus Hamburg
- Du Hitler, (2011), Linz State Theatre
- Die Jüdin von Toledo, (2012), Norddeutsche Landesbühne, Wilhelmshaven
- Patricks Trick, (2014), Theater der Jungen Welt, Leipzig;

== Staging ==
- Durstige Vögel, Munich People's Theater, 2002
- Klamms Krieg von Kai Hensel, Moks, Bremen Theatre, 2003
- Heldenhaft von Katharina Schlender, Theater Erlangen, 2004
- FSK 16, Schnawwl, Nationaltheater Mannheim, 2004
- Sommer mit Mädchen von Kai Hensel, Staatstheater Braunschweig, 2004
- Zabibi und Muzalifa von Bente Jonker, Schnawwl, Nationaltheater Mannheim, 2005
- Tell von Kristo Šagor und Marc Reisner, Nationaltheater Mannheim, 2005
- La Ronde nach Arthur Schnitzler, Theater Erlangen, 2005
- Früchte des Nichts von Ferdinand Bruckner, Neues Theater Halle, 2005
- Traumpaar von Zoran Drvenkar, Theater an der Parkaue, Berlin, 2006
- Frankenstein von Marc Reisner und Kristo Šagor, Oldenburgisches Staatstheater, 2006
- Törleß, nach Robert Musil in einer Bearbeitung von Thomas Birkmeir, Deutsches Schauspielhaus Hamburg, 2007
- Genannt Gospodin von Philipp Löhle, Schauspielhaus Bochum, 2007
- Werther. Sprache der Liebe, Theater Lübeck, 2008
- Der Kick von Gesine Schmidt und Andres Veiel, Theater Lübeck, 2008
- Fressen, Kaufen, Gassi Gehen von Gabriele Kögl, Deutsches Schauspielhaus Hamburg, 2008
- Der eigene Raum, Schauspielhaus Bochum, 2008
- Das Haus der vielen Zungen von Jonathan Garfinkel, Schauspielhaus Bochum, 2008
- Alle kriegen dick und werden Kinder, Hanover Drama, 2009
- Fremdeln, Junges Ensemble Stuttgart, 2010
- Die Affäre Rue de Lourcine von Eugène Labiche, Theater Lübeck, 2010
- Amphitryon von Heinrich von Kleist, Staatstheater Stuttgart, 2011
- Die nächste Unschuld, Theater Chemnitz, 2011
- Verschwunden von Charles Way, Theater Münster, 2012
- Nichts – Was im Leben wichtig ist nach Janne Teller, Schnawwl, Nationaltheater Mannheim, 2013
- Clavigo von Johann Wolfgang von Goethe, Junges Ensemble Stuttgart, 2013
- Die Judenbuche, nach Annette von Droste-Hülshoff, Theater Münster, 2014
- Merlin oder Das wüste Land von Tankred Dorst, Staatsschauspiel Dresden, 2014
- The Wild Swans nach Hans Christian Andersen, Theater Bonn, 2014
- Lord of the Flies von William Golding, Staatsschauspiel Dresden, 2016

== Important prizes ==
- 2001: Audience Award of the Heidelberg Stückemarkt for Unbeleckt
- 2003: Author's Prize for FSK 16 at the 5th Dutch-German Children's and Youth Theater Festival Kaas & Kappes in Duisburg
- 2005: Author's Prize for Trüffelschweine at the 7th Dutch-German Children's and Youth Theater Festival Kaas & Kappes in Duisburg
- 2008: Der Faust in the category best director children's and youth theater for Törleß at the Deutsches Schauspielhaus Hamburg
- 2014: Baden-Württemberg Youth Theater Prize for Patrick's Trick
- 2019: Mülheimer KinderStückePreis for Ich lieb dich
