= The Firework-Maker's Daughter (opera) =

Opera

The Firework-Maker's Daughter is a 2013 chamber opera in two acts by David Bruce with a libretto by Glyn Maxwell based on the novel by Philip Pullman. It follows the adventures of Lila, a young girl who wishes to be a firework-maker like her father.

The opera was co-commissioned by the Royal Opera House, London, and The Opera Group, and for its original run was co-produced by Opera North and The Opera Group in association with ROH2 and Watford Palace Theatre. The production, directed by John Fulljames, premiered at the Hull Truck Theatre in March 2013, before touring the UK and going to the New Victory Theater in New York City. The production was revived at the Royal Opera House's Linbury Studio in December 2015.

The opera was shortlisted for the 2014 Olivier Awards for Best New Opera Production, and for a 2013 British Composer Awards in the Stage category.

A production directed by Bill Bankes-Jones in association with Tête à Tête opera company was performed at the Minack Theatre and Prideaux Place, both in Cornwall, in June and July 2022.

== Roles ==
Original cast:

- Lila (soprano) – Mary Bevan
- Lalchand (baritone) – Wyn Pencarreg
- Rambashi (bass-baritone) – Andrew Slater
- Chulak (tenor) – Amar Muchhala
- Hamlet (countertenor) – Jamie Laing
