= Jonathan Garfinkel =

Jonathan Garfinkel (born 1973 in Toronto) is a Jewish-Canadian playwright and author. He gained prominence especially for his play The Trials of John Demjanjuk: A Holocaust Cabaret.

== Early life and education ==
Coming from a Zionist family, Garfinkel learned Hebrew and Yiddish. He attended the Bialik Hebrew Day School in Toronto, graduating in 1987.

== Career ==
As an adult, he left Zionism. Before he dedicated himself to writing, he worked as a waiter, carpenter and English literature teacher.

He published his poetry collection, Glass Psalms, in 2005. In 2007 he followed with his autobiographical work Ambivalence, in which he describes how he broke away from Zionism, triggered by a trip to Israel. During his stay in the West Bank he visited several Palestinian refugee camps. Jean Hannah Edelstein reviewed his book in New Statesman, saying: ”This is a book both painful and beautiful to read”.

The Demjanjuk Trials premiered in Canada in 2004 and was staged in Germany at the Theater Heidelberg by Catja Baumann in 2010. Discussing his play, Christian Gampert states on the Deutschlandradio Kultur:" Jonathan Garfinkel […] takes the liberty to say: Such trials are absurd and only scratch the surface. However, to unsettle his audience Garfinkel uses theatrical devices which have never been used before in this topic in Germany: sympathy for the perpetrators, vicious songs, courtroom skits, Holocaust jokes."

His play House of Many Tongues was also staged in Germany by Kristo Šagor in the Schauspielhaus Bochum. Sven Westernströer wrote in Derwesten.de: "The playwright is Jewish-Canadian. This is important to know in order to understand why in his play Garfinkel approaches a highly sensitive and emotionally charged topic like the Middle East conflict in his play with respect, but also with a certain distance and liberating irony. His characters, whether Israeli or Palestinian, are all likeable characters […]".

He writes articles for the Jüdische Allgemeine, The Globe and Mail, and Walrus, among other publications. He lives in Toronto, Budapest and Berlin.

== Awards and honours ==
Garfinkel has received several awards, including the Toronto Arts Council Senior Writers scholarship in 2006, and the K.M. Hunter Award for best young playwright in 2008. In 2009, he received a scholarship from the Akademie Schloss Solitude.

== Books ==
- In a Land Without Dogs the Cats Learn to Bark. House of Anansi Press, Toronto 2023, ISBN 978-1-5870-0416-3.
