= The Firework-Maker's Daughter =

1995 children's novella by Philip Pullman

- First edition cover
- Author: Philip Pullman
- Illustrator: Nick Harris (UK edition); S. Saelig Gallagher (US edition)
- Genre: Children's
- Publisher: Doubleday
- Publication date: 2 November 1995
- Publication place: United Kingdom
- Pages: 112
- ISBN: 0-385-40527-8
- OCLC: 43161803

The Firework-Maker's Daughter is a children's novella by Philip Pullman. It was first published in the United Kingdom by Doubleday in 1995. The first UK edition was illustrated by Nick Harris; a subsequent edition published in the United States was illustrated by S. Saelig Gallagher.

Pullman originally wrote the story as a school play, and the novel was in turn adapted into a play. Called a "fairy tale" by Pullman, the novel is both a children's adventure story where the main character undertakes a quest to prove herself, and a metaphor for making art.

== Plot ==
A young girl called Lila wants to become a firework-maker, like her father Lalchand. Despite her talents, Lalchand believes this is an unsuitable job for girls. Lila disagrees, and journeys to get Royal Sulphur from Razvani the Fire-Fiend at Mount Merapi, as all aspirant firework-makers must do.

The quest is nearly unsuccessful, as she does not have protection from the Fire-Fiend's flames or the Three Gifts to present to Razvani. However, her friends Hamlet, a talking white elephant, and Chulak, Hamlet's caretaker, manage to deliver the water of the Goddess of the Emerald Lake that will protect her. To Lila's surprise, Razvani recognizes her as a firework maker who has brought the Three Gifts, despite Lila being unaware of what the Three Gifts are.

Upon her return home, she learns that Lalchand has been imprisoned because of the disappearance of Hamlet. To save his life, Lila and Lalchand must win the upcoming competition for the Firework Festival against other extremely talented firework makers. Upon their victory, Lalchand explains to his daughter that she does possess the Three Gifts: rather than tangible objects, they are talent, perseverance, and luck, all of which she has. She has talent, having worked with her father at firework-making for many years; courage and perseverance, for having undertaken the journey; and good fortune, which lies in having loyal friends, Chulak and Hamlet.

== Adaptation ==
The Firework-Maker's Daughter has been adapted into an opera of the same name with music by David Bruce and a libretto by Glyn Maxwell. Co-commissioned by ROH2 and The Opera Group, the opera was co-produced by Opera North and The Opera Group in association with ROH2 and Watford Palace Theatre. The production, directed by John Fulljames, premiered at the Hull Truck Theatre in March 2013, before touring the UK and going to the New Victory Theater in New York City.

An animated adaptation by The Weinstein Company was planned but cancelled.
