= Roman Mints =

Russian violinist (born 1976)

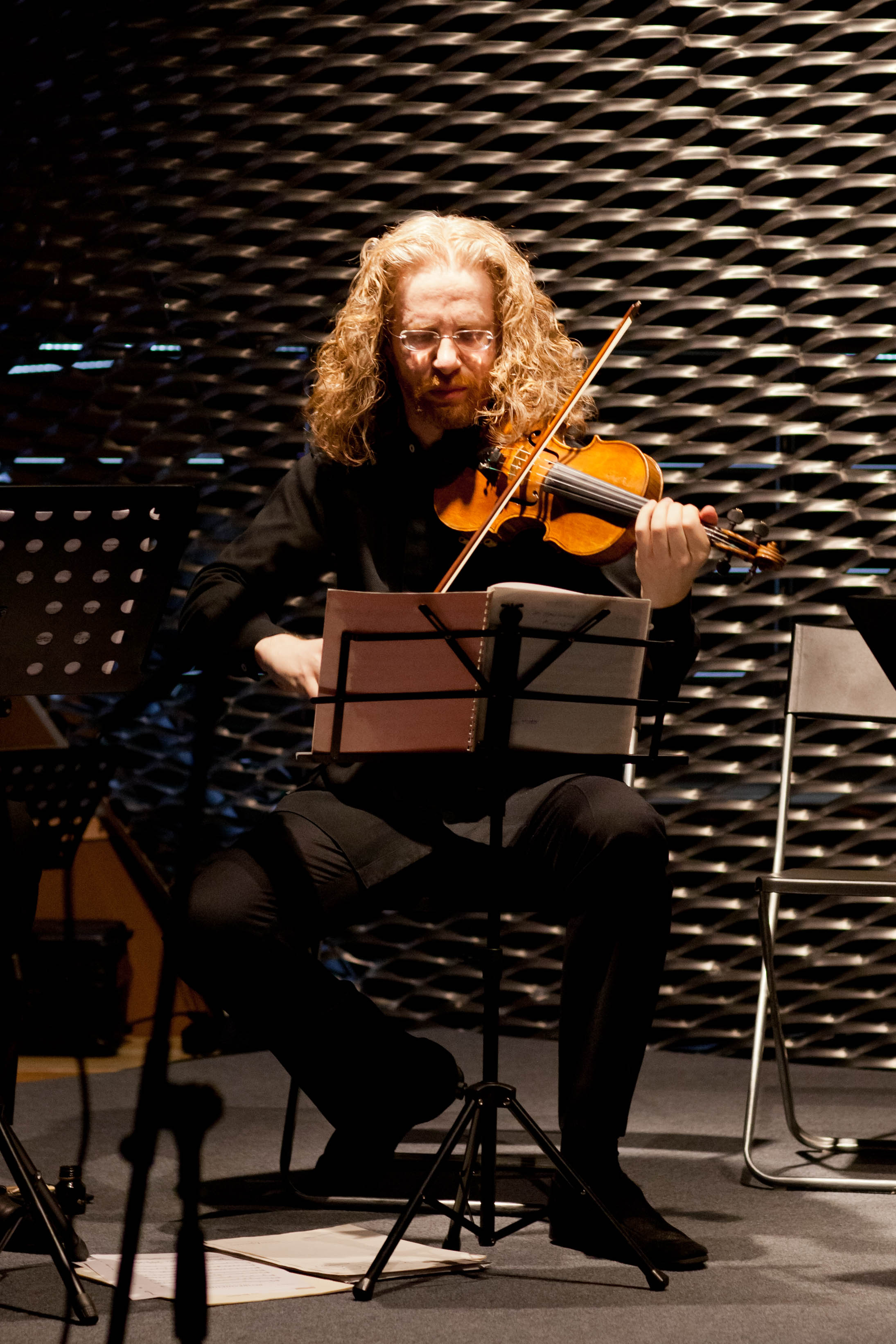
Roman Mints

Roman Mints (born 1976 in Moscow) is a British violinist. He has worked with other violinists and together with oboist Dmitry Bulgakov founded the Homecoming Chamber Music Festival. He has given premieres of various works and recorded a number of albums.

== Early life and studies ==
Roman Mints was born in Moscow and began playing the violin at the age of five. In 1994, he won a Foundation Scholarship to the Royal College of Music in London and also studied at the Guildhall School of Music and Drama, winning prizes at each, alongside contemporaries Dobrinka Tabakova, Elena Langer, Maxim Rysanov and Kristina Blaumane.

== Artistic activities ==
Roman Mints has collaborated with violinists Gidon Kremer, Alina Ibragimova, Boris Brovtsyn, Alexander Sitkovetsky; flautist Sharon Bezaly, oboists Dmitri Bulgakov and Nicholas Daniel; pianists Katya Apekisheva, Ingrid Fliter, Alexander Kobrin, Charles Owen, Vadym Kholodenko, Andrey Gugnin, Lukas Geniušas; cellists Boris Andrianov, Jamie Walton, Alexander Buzlov and Kristina Blaumane; violists Maxim Rysanov and Nils Mönkemeyer; singers Gweneth-Ann Jeffers, William Purefoy and Anna Dennis. He has worked alongside conductors Andrew Davis, Saulius Sondeckis, Vladimir Ziva, Vladimir Ponkin, Philipp Chizhevsky and others. He has performed with groups as London Mozart Players, London Chamber Orchestra, Lithuanian Chamber Orchestra, Musica Viva Orchestra, Russian Philharmonia, Kremerata Baltica, Prague Soloists and Prague Sinfonia.

Roman has given Russian premieres of works by Osvaldo Golijov, John Tavener, James MacMillan, Giacinto Scelsi and Marjan Mozetich. He has also given world premieres of over fifty works by Dobrinka Tabakova, Leonid Desyatnikov, Elena Langer, Ed Bennett, Brian Irvine, Diana Burrell, Artem Vassiliev, Alexey Kurbatov and others.

In 1998, Roman Mints and oboist Dmitry Bulgakov founded the Homecoming Chamber Music Festival which takes place annually in Moscow. The core of Homecoming concert programmes are themed selections of works with one powerful underlying but not necessarily musical, idea behind them. Since the inception of the festival, Roman Mints has authored more than 60 such programmes. In April 2002, he co-directed the Suppressed Music project in Russia, which consisted of two concerts and a conference on composers whose music had been suppressed. A book and CD were released as a result of this project, by the Klassika XXI Publishing House.

Outside the classical field, Roman has worked with free-improvising saxophonist Paul Dunmall, vocalist Alisa Ten, the Brian Irvine Ensemble, Pokrovsky Ensemble, and Russian IDM group EU. He has also participated in several theatre productions including Langer's "Ariadne" and Stravinsky’s "The Soldier’s Tale". He has worked with theatre directors Vasily Barkhatov and Tim Hopkins, choreographers Alla Sigalova and Oleg Glushkov, and film director Alexander Zeldovich. His recording of the Mozetich Violin Concerto "Affairs of the Heart" was used in productions by Hong Kong Ballet, Royal Winnipeg Ballet and the Q-dance company.

Roman Mints plays a Francesco Ruggieri violin, circa 1685.

== Recordings ==
Roman Mints has recorded for ECM, Harmonia Mundi, Quartz and other labels, with his albums featuring a number of world-premiere recordings. An album of works by Dobrinka Tabakova for ECM was nominated for a Grammy Award for Best Classical Compendium. His recording of solo violin music, with an innovative recording approach invented by Roman and dubbed “spatial orchestration,” was a CD of the week at WQXR Radio New York and on the annual wish list of Fanfare magazine critics. The album of Leonid Desyatnikov's music for violin and orchestra was nominated for ICMA Award and received a Five Stars review for performance and recording with BBC Music Magazine.

=== Discography ===
- Desyatnikov: Sketches to Sunset | Russian Seasons (2017). Roman Mints (violin), Yana Ivanilova (soprano), Alexey Goribol (piano), Brno Philharmonic Orchestra, Lithuanian Chamber Orchestra, Philipp Chizhevsky (conductor). Published by Quartz.
- Alfred Schnittke: Works for Violin and Piano | Suite in Old Style (2016). Roman Mints (violin), Katya Apekisheva (piano), Olga Martynova (harpsichord), Andrey Doynikov (percussion), Dmitri Vlassik (percussion). Published by Quartz.
- Elena Langer: Landscape With Three People (2016). Anna Dennis, William Towers, Nicholas Daniel, Roman Mints, Meghan Cassidy, Kristina Blaumane, Robert Howarth, Katya Apekisheva. Published by Harmonia Mundi.
- Dance of Shadows (2014). Ysaÿe | Piazzolla | Tabakova | Schnittke | Silvestrov. Roman Mints, Violin. Published by Quartz.
- Dobrinka Tabakova: String Paths (2013). Kristina Blaumane (cello), Maxim Rysanov (viola, conductor), Janine Jansen, Roman Mints, Julia-Maria Kretz (violin), Amihai Grosz (viola), Torleif Thedéen, Boris Andrianov (cello), Raimondas Sviackevičius (accordion), Vaiva Eidukaitytė-Storastienė (harpsichord), Donatas Bagurskas, Stacey Watton (double bass), Lithuanian Chamber Orchestra. Published by ECM New Series.
- Leonid Desyatnikov: The Leaden Echo (2011). Roman Mints, Alexei Goribol, William Purefoy, Anton Dressler, Anna Panina, Fedor Lednev, Pavel Stepin, Serj Poltavski, Evgeny Rumyantsev, Petr Kondrashin, Dmitri Sharov, Yuri Kolosov, Kirill Koloskov, Dmitri Vlassik, Asya Sorshneva. Published by Quartz.
- Exodus (2008). Paul Dunmall (soprano saxophone), Roman Mints (violin). Published by Quartz.
- Roman Mints Violin: Mozetich | Langer | Schnittke (2007). Maxim Rysanov (viola), Kristine Blaumane (cello), New Prague Sinfonia, West Kazakhstan Philharmonic Orchestra, Mikel Toms (conductor).
- Game Over (2011). Works for Violin & Electronics. Roman Mints, violin. Ed Bennett, Taras Buevsky, Alexander Raikhelson, Artem Vassiliev. Published by Quartz.
- Transformations (1999). 20th Century Works for Violin & Piano. Roman Mints (violin), Elena Chudinovich (piano). Published by Black Box.
