= Charles Owen =

Charles or Charlie Owen may refer to:

- Charles Owen (pianist) (born 1971), British classical pianist
- Charles Owen (politician), member of the Louisiana House of Representatives
- Charles Lewis Owen (1852–1926), American-born manufacturer and political figure in Ontario, Canada
- Charles Mansfield Owen (1852–1940), Anglican priest
- Charlie Owen (footballer) (1887–1956), Australian rules footballer
- Charlie Owen (musician), Australian multi-instrumentalist and producer
