= Interplay =

Interplay may refer to:

== Music ==
- Interplay (Bill Evans album), 1962
- Interplay (Al Haig album), 1976
- Interplay (Ride album), 2024
- Interplay for 2 Trumpets and 2 Tenors, an album by John Coltrane, 1957
- Interplay, an album by John Stein, 2004
- Interplay, an album by Larry Santos, 1980
- Interplay Records, an American jazz label

== Theater ==
- Interplay (ballet), by Jerome Robbins, 1945
- Interplay Europe, a festival for young playwrights in Europe
- World Interplay, an Australian young playwrights festival

== Gaming ==
- Interplay (magazine), a 1980s gaming magazine
- Interplay Entertainment, a video game developer and publisher
