= Nothing (opera) =

2016 opera by David Bruce

Nothing is a two-act opera by the British composer David Bruce to a libretto by Glyn Maxwell, based on the award-winning novel of the same name by Janne Teller.

The opera was co-commissioned by the Royal Opera House, London, and Glyndebourne. The original production, directed by Bijan Sheibani, premiered at Glyndebourne in February 2016, featuring Glyndebourne Youth Opera and Southbank Sinfonia. The performances were conducted by Sian Edwards.

== Roles ==
The opera has five principal roles and three smaller roles that are performed by members of the chorus. The chorus itself is written for young voices.

Role	Voice type	Premiere cast, 25 February 2016 (conductor: Sian Edwards)
Pierre	tenor	Stuart Jackson
Agnes	soprano	Robyn Allegra Parton
Ursula	mezzo-soprano	Marta Fontanals-Simmons
Johan	counter-tenor	James Hall
Karl	bass-baritone	Tristan Hambleton
Chorus of classmates

== Synopsis ==
On the first day back at school one September, a boy called Pierre walks out of the class, climbs a plum tree, and declares that ‘nothing matters’. His classmates try without success to bring him down from the tree. Desperate to prove him wrong, they give up their childhood possessions to a bonfire, "a Pile of Meaning", so their tears will prove things matter.

When this makes no impression on Pierre, they decide to force one another to give up whatever is most important to each of them. This starts with toys and clothes, but soon escalates monstrously: one girl’s hair – the national flag – the corpse of a pet – a figure of Jesus – until finally, with Pierre still claiming life is pointless – the children give up body and soul in a terrible spiral of sacrifice.

Finally, Pierre comes to see the ‘Pile of Meaning’. He climbs it, crying out that life is beautiful – because it means nothing. In rage and regret the children set upon him. He is never seen again. Years later at Christmas, the children, now adults from all walks of life, gather by the plum tree to hang purple baubles on its branches, in recognition that whatever it was they went through together, the life and death of Pierre meant something, and cannot be forgotten.

Nothing is a story of lost childhood, the getting of wisdom, and the madness of crowds. The children are forced to confront the darkest answer to the question of existence, yet somehow find love and humanity in their responses. They absorb the horror of this communal experience, and move on through life, sadder and wiser, ever searching for truth and meaning.

== Instrumentation ==
The opera is scored for the following orchestra:

=== Woodwinds ===
- 3 Flutes (2nd doubling Piccolo)
- 3 Oboes (2nd doubling English Horn)
- 3 Clarinets (2nd doubling Bass clarinet)
- 3 Bassoons

=== Brass ===
- 4 Horns
- 3 Trumpets
- 3 Trombones (all with F extension)

=== Percussion (4 players) ===
- Large orchestral Bass Drum (with Cymbal attached to side)
- Large Tam-tam (with bow)
- Marimba
- Kit Bass Drum (optional)
- Tambourine
- Timpani
- 8" Splash Cymbal
- Triangle
- Crash Cymbal
- Glockenspiel
- Low tenor Steel Drum
- Snare Drum
- 2 Large Stones
- Sandpaper Blocks
- Shekere
- Suspended Cymbal with bow
- Ruler

=== Harps and keyboards ===
- Harp
- Harpsichord

=== Strings ===
- 10 Violin I
- 8 Violin II
- 8 Violas
- 6 Cellos
- 4 Double basses

== Critical response ==
The reviews for the opening production of Nothing were overwhelmingly positive. In a five star review, The Independent called the piece "a pretty well flawless piece which, unlike almost all other recent operas about adolescent alienation, rings true to life." Rupert Christiansen in The Telegraph said "The audience was held rapt by a performance that by any standards exerted a chilling power and intensity." Mark Pullinger of BachTrack.com said "Nothing is the most powerful contemporary opera I’ve seen since Written on Skin, which is high praise indeed."

== Future productions ==
The original production of Nothing was revived by the Danish National Opera in Aarhus, Denmark in February 2017, as part of the European Capital of Culture celebrations.

Nothing was performed at the Copenhagen Opera House in 2020 as part of the Royal Danish Theatre's 2020/2021 season.
