= Shoshana Riseman =

Israeli music educator, stage director and composer

Shosh (Shoshana) Riseman (or Raizman, Hebrew: שוש רייזמן; born 10 April 1948) is an Israeli music educator, stage director and composer.

== Biography ==
Riseman was born at 1948 in a refugee camp in Cyprus, after her parents, Holocaust survivors, had been deported from Israel by the British authorities.

She graduated from the Buchmann-Mehta School of Music in 1970. She studied composition and orchestration with Noam Sheriff, Leon Schidlowsky and Yosef Dorfman at Tel Aviv University in Israel, with Hans Heimler, at Guilford University in England, and Ralph Shapy, Chicago University in the USA. She also studied electroacoustic music with Sanday and voice with Mira Zakai and Hanna Hacohen at Tel Aviv University.

Reisman is highly regarded for her extensive work composing music for dozens of theatre productions across Israel's major stages. Her compositional work spans nearly every genre, from original plays and Israeli drama to classical and modern international works.

She teaches theater arts at Tel Aviv University.

== Honors and awards ==
- 1969 - America-Israel Cultural Foundation scholarship
- 1986 - First prize for the music to "Hymn for David", Acco Festival of Alternative Israeli Theatre
- 1987 - Special prize, Acco Festival of Alternative Israeli Theatre
- 2001 - Nominee for Israeli Theatre Award

== Works ==
Riseman has composed music for about fifty plays. Selected works include:

- 1972 - The Good Soldier Svejk, operetta
- 1972 - Background music for the Media, KPM Records, London
- 1973 - The Childrens from Shchunat Chaim, for television
- 1976 - What a Lovely Day, CBS Records
- 1983 - 9 Haiku Songs
- 1987 - Avishai Milshtein, Then is Death
- 1989 - Euripides - Iphigenia at Aulis, Seminar Hakibutzim, The Kibutz
- 1990 - Sam Shepard, Love/Death, Theatronetto
- 1992 - The Toledo Girls, opera, Libretto: Joshua Sobol
- 1999 - Dylan Thomas, Under Milk Wood
- 2001 - Oscar Wilde, The Rose and the Nightingale, opera, Libretto: Moshe Prives
- Everything is Here, musical
