= Alan Wilkins =

Alan Wilkins may refer to:

- Alan Wilkins (cricketer) (born 1953), former English county cricketer and sports commentator
- Alan Wilkins (playwright) (1969–2022), Scottish playwright
