= Henning Fangauf =

Henning Fangauf (born 1954) is the Deputy Director of the Children's and Young People's Theatre Centre in Germany. He studied German Literature and History in Hamburg. From 1981 to 1989 he was in-house dramaturge for the City Theatres in Coburg, Osnabrück and Bremen. The current focus of his work is the promotion of playwrights and international exchange in children's and young people's theatre. In addition, he has published several books about drama and children's and young people's literature. He is also editor of the Theatre Pedagogical Library series for the publishers Heinrichshofen Bucher and Klett Schulbuch Verlag and is a member of the advisory board for the Promotion of Independent Theatre in the State of Hesse. For the Goethe Institute he is working as lecturer. He is a member of the board of directors of World Interplay as well as presiding chairman of Interplay Europe e.V.. He organised the first two Interplay Europe Festivals in 1995 and 1998 in Germany.
