= Lizzy Dijeh =

British playwright and poet

Lizzy Dijeh is a British playwright and poet of Nigerian origin.

Born in London, Dijeh is a graduate of the University of York, where she read English and Related Literature. She is a former member of the Royal Court Young Writer's Programme and its Invitation Group. In July 2007 she was one of six writers selected by the Royal Court Theatre to attend the 10th World Interplay festival in Australia as the UK representative alongside the playwright and UK tutor for that year, Tanika Gupta. Dijeh's play High Life debuted at the Hampstead Theatre, in the Michael Frayn Space in October 2009 and was also shortlisted for the prestigious Alfred Fagon Award in 2007. Her play Message from a Far Country was presented by Tiata Fahodzi as part of "Tiata Delights 2011), their festival of African play readings (26 September-8 October 2011).

Her poetry has twice been featured in Wasafiri and she performed as a guest speaker at the South Bank Centre in late 2009 in a special event to celebrate 25 years of the magazine. A selection of her work was published in Red: Contemporary Black British Poetry, a book of new Black British poetry, co-edited by Kwame Dawes, in February 2010. In 2012, Out of Bounds, co-edited by Jackie Kay, featured a newly charted map of Britain, a poetic A-Z guide of the nation as viewed by its Black and Asian poets. The book includes one of her specially written poems on the redevelopment of Stratford and the London 2012 Olympics.
