= Glyn Maxwell =

British writer

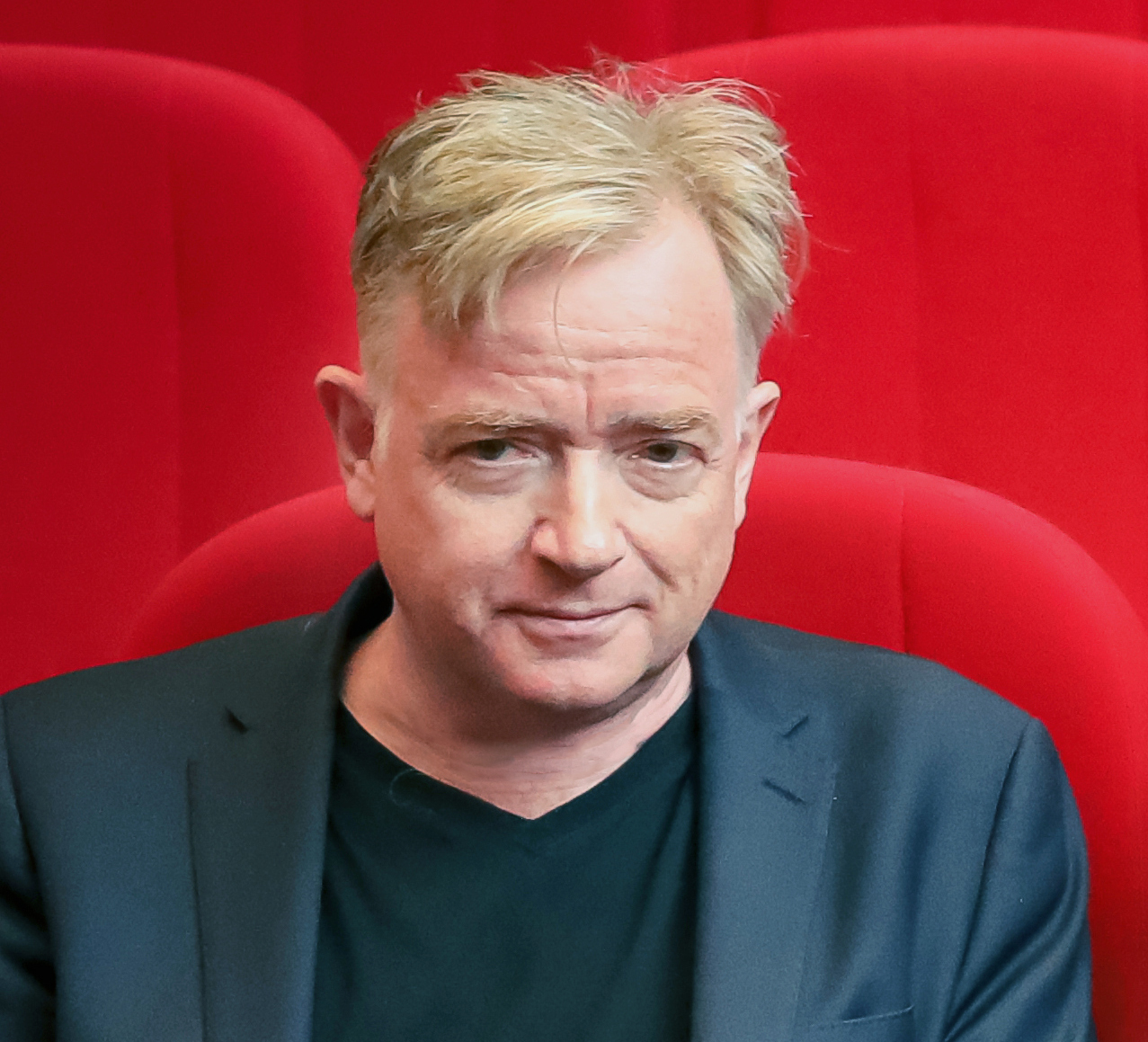
Maxwell in 2019

Glyn Maxwell (born 1962) is a British poet, playwright, novelist, librettist, and lecturer.

== Early life ==
Of primarily Welsh heritage — his mother Buddug-Mair Powell (b. 1928) acted in the original stage show of Dylan Thomas's Under Milk Wood in the West End and on Broadway in 1956 — Maxwell was born and raised in Welwyn Garden City, Hertfordshire.

His father James Maxwell (1928-2016) was an industrial chemist. Maxwell has two brothers, Alun (b. 1960), and David (b. 1964). His cousin Kerry Lee Powell is a noted Canadian writer.

He studied English at Worcester College, Oxford. He began an MLitt there but dropped out. In 1987 he moved to America to study poetry and drama with Derek Walcott at Boston University. He returned to the UK and began publishing poetry in the 1990s.

After his marriage and the birth of his daughter Alfie, he moved with his family to the USA, living and teaching at first in Amherst, Massachusetts, and then in New York City. He returned to the UK in 2006.

In the years 1991, 1993 and 1995, Maxwell staged performances of his plays in his parents' garden in Welwyn Garden City. These were featured in the national press and on radio.

== Poetry ==
His three earliest collections of poetry, Tale Of The Mayor's Son (1990), Out of the Rain (1992), Rest For The Wicked (1995) are collected as The Boys at Twilight: Poems 1990-1995 (2000). The Nerve won the Geoffrey Faber Memorial Prize in 2004. All his other collections of poems – The Breakage, Hide Now and Pluto – have been shortlisted for either the T. S. Eliot Prize, Forward Prize, or Costa Book Prize. He was awarded the Society of Authors's Cholmondeley Award for his poetry in 2014.

In 1994 he was named one of the New Generation poets and he received the E. M. Forster Award in 1997. His most recent collections are One Thousand Nights and Counting: Selected Poems and Pluto. His work appears in several anthologies of the best of 20th century poetry.

In 1999 Maxwell left Faber & Faber as a result of editorial disagreement over his poem Time's Fool, and his work has since been published by Picador in the UK. In the US he has been published by Houghton Mifflin and Farrar Straus Giroux.

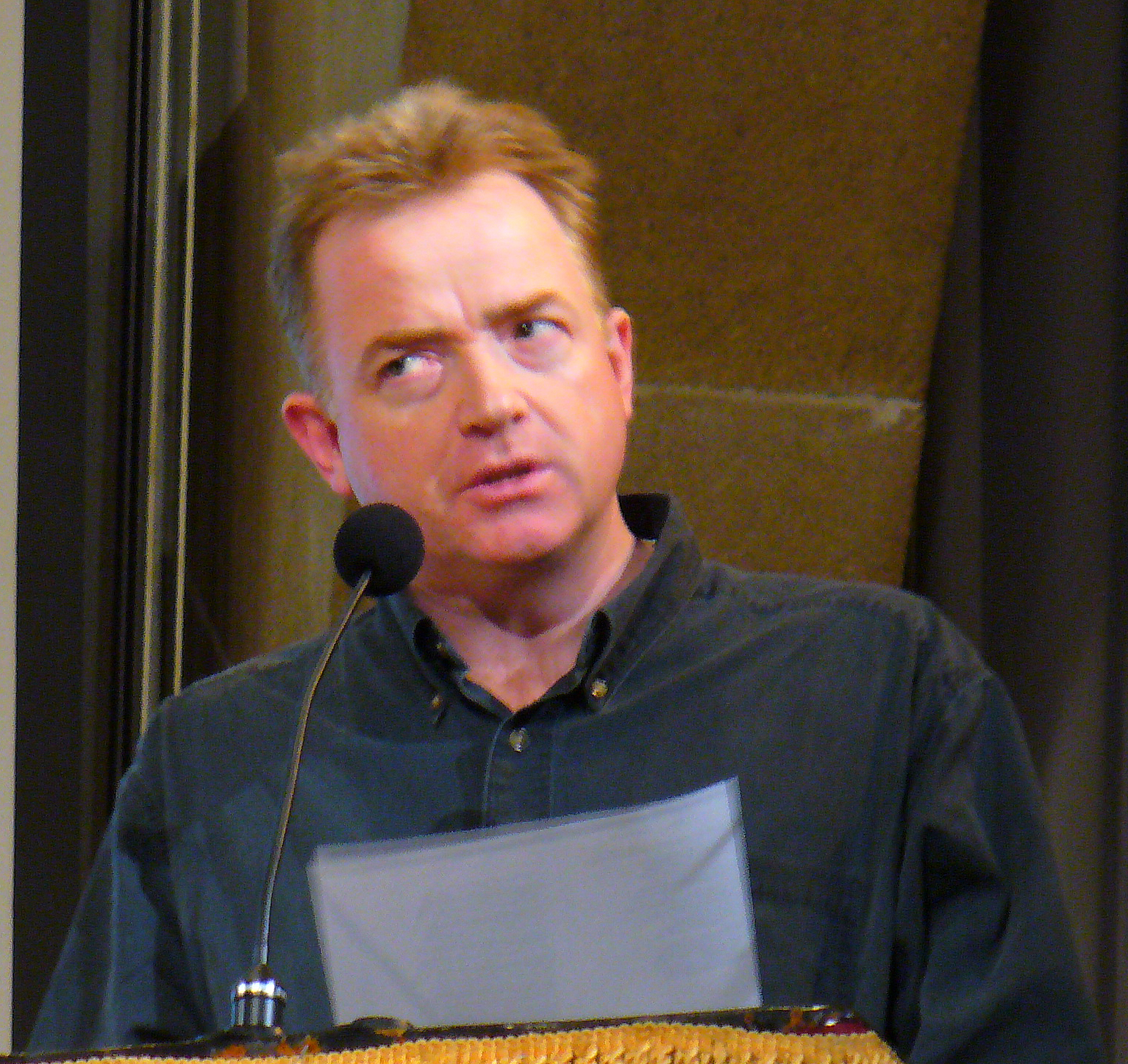
Maxwell at an event in 2007

In 2014 he edited a collected edition of the poems of Derek Walcott, The Poetry of Derek Walcott 1948–2013.

His book of poetry, How the Hell Are You was published by Picador in 2020.

== Film ==
In 2018, the rights to Maxwell's epic poem Time's Fool (1999) were optioned by the film director Paul King and the screenwriter Jon Croker, and subsequently bought by Fox Searchlight for development as a feature film, with King and Croker as writers, and David Heyman as producer.

Maxwell co-wrote the screenplay for The Beast In The Jungle, a dance-film based on the Henry James novella, with the film's director Clara Van Gool. The film premiered at the Rotterdam Film Festival in February 2019. It also featured at the film festivals of Goteborg, San Francisco, New York and Shanghai.

== Prose ==
Maxwell's critical guidebook On Poetry (Oberon Books, 2012) was described by Adam Newey in The Guardian as 'the best book about poetry I've ever read' and by Hugo Williams in The Spectator as 'a modern classic'.

A stand-alone sequel, titled Drinks With Dead Poets: The Autumn Term and set in a mysterious village, was published by Oberon in October 2016. In this 'brilliantly unclassifiable' work, several deceased poets appear as characters, their speech taken verbatim from their writings. A sequel, Last Night In England, is in process.

His first novel, Blue Burneau (1994), was shortlisted for the Whitbread First Novel Prize and the book Moon Country, published in 1996, describes a visit to Iceland with Simon Armitage. His second novel, The Girl Who Was Going To Die, was published in 2008 by Cape in the UK and by Kunstmann in Germany.

== Drama ==
Plays include After Troy (dir. Alex Clifton), a retelling of Euripides' Women of Troy and Hecabe (Oxford Playhouse/Shaw Theatre London), Lily Jones's Birthday a satyr-play based on Aristophanes' Lysistrata, which premiered at RADA in 2009; Liberty, about the French Revolution, which premiered at Shakespeare's Globe in the 2008 season (dir. Guy Retallack) and toured the UK. In New York, Agamemnon Home (dir. Amy Wagner) received its world premiere in April 2012.

Several of Maxwell's plays and adaptations have been staged at Chester's Grosvenor Park Open-Air Theatre, or in the city's new Storyhouse Theatre, which opened in 2017 under the Artistic Directorship of Alex Clifton: these were Merlin and the Woods of Time (2011, dir. Alex Clifton), Masters Are You Mad? (2012, dir. Robin Norton-Hale), Cyrano De Bergerac (2013, dir. Lucy Pitman-Wallace), Wind in the Willows (2015, dir. Alex Clifton), The Beggar's Opera, a new version of the John Gay classic, (2017, dir. Alex Clifton), Alice in Wonderland (2017, dir. Derek Bond) and The Secret Seven (2017, dir. Alex Clifton). Wind in the Willows and The Secret Seven were both nominated as 'Best Play For Young People' at the British Theatre Awards. His eighth play for Chester, Jekyll and Hyde, played in autumn 2019 at Storyhouse.

His version of Cyrano de Bergerac was also staged at Southwark Playhouse in 2016 (dir. Russell Bolam) starring Kathryn Hunter. Others recent plays include Babette's Feast (2017, dir. Bill Buckhurst), starring Sheila Atim, Diana Quick and Joseph Marcell.

The Lifeblood, concerning the last days of Mary, Queen of Scots, was British Theatre Guide's 'Play of the Fringe' at Edinburgh in 2004, and was directed by Guy Retallack with Sue Scott Davison as Mary. The Lifeblood was first performed at the Hen and Chickens Theatre in 2001 with Felicity Wren as Mary. His play Mimi and The Stalker was one of six projects awarded funding by the UK Film Council in the spring 2009 quarter, for development as a screenplay under the name Witchgrass.

Other plays include Wolfpit, about two green children said to have appeared in Suffolk in the 12th century (Edinburgh 1996; New York 2006), The Forever Waltz, a reworking of the Orpheus-Eurydice story (New York 2005; Edinburgh 2005), and The Only Girl in the World, a play about Mary Kelly, the last victim of Jack the Ripper (Hoxton Hall, 2001, Arcola, 2008).

He contributed the fantasy The Black Remote to the National Theatre's Connections series in 2006.

He is the Resident Playwright for New York's Phoenix Theatre Ensemble, who have staged Broken Journey, Wolfpit, The Lifeblood and Agamemnon Home in New York, and will present The Gambler (after Dostoevsky's novella) in January 2016 at the Wild Project in the East Village.

His verse monologue, The Best Man, was turned into a feature film starring Danny Swanson (dir. Jon Croker).

Several of Maxwell's plays and opera libretti are published by Oberon Books.

Maxwell directed his own play The City of Tomorrow at the Barn Theatre, Welwyn Garden City, in 2020, as part of the centenary celebrations of his home town.

== Interviews ==
Glyn Maxwell was interviewed about his verse drama plays on the podcast Hamlet to Hamilton: Exploring Verse Drama, hosted by Emily C. A. Snyder and Colin Kovarik.

== Radio ==
His radio plays for BBC Radio 3 and BBC Radio 4 include: Lexicon (2015, dir. Toby Swift, starring Sally Phillips), Time For One More Question, (2015, dir. Nadia Molinari, a celebration of the Hay Festival), Shakespeare's Fire, (2015, dir. Frank Stirling, starring Jane Horrocks), Cyrano De Bergerac, (2015, dir. Susan Roberts, starring Tom Burke), The City of Tomorrow, (2014, dir. Tim Dee, starring Pippa Haywood and Julian Rhind-Tutt), The Gambler (2009, dir. Guy Retallack, starring Patricia Routledge) and Childminders (2006, dir. Peter Kavanagh, starring Olivia Williams).

In 1994 he travelled to Iceland with his friend and fellow-poet Simon Armitage, to make a series for Radio 3. This became the travelogue Moon Country (Faber, 1996). In 1996 they travelled to Brazil for another Radio 3 series, To Bahia and Beyond.

== Opera ==
Maxwell's libretto for David Bruce's The Firework Maker's Daughter, (2013, dir. John Fulljames, based on the Philip Pullman story) was nominated for an Olivier Award in 2014. It played at the Linbury in the Royal Opera House, as well as in New York and a UK tour. His other operas include Luke Bedford's Seven Angels, premiered at Birmingham Contemporary Music Group in June 2010 before a UK tour, and Elena Langer's opera The Lion's Face, which toured the UK in 2009. A short version of The Lion's Face, (then titled The Present) won the Audience Prize at the Zurich Opera House's New Opera Festival in January 2009. His other libretti include The Girl of Sand, also composed by Elena Langer and performed at the Almeida Opera Festival in 2004, and The Birds (after Aristophanes), composed by Edward Dudley Hughes and performed by I Fagiolini at the City of London Festival in 2005.

In 2016, Maxwell collaborated with David Bruce again, on Nothing, an opera adapted from the book by Janne Teller. This was staged at Glyndebourne in 2016 (dir. Bijan Sheibani) and subsequently at Aarhus, Denmark.

== Journalism, Editorial ==
Maxwell was Poetry Editor of The New Republic from 2001 to 2007. He has reviewed for the Times Literary Supplement, The Sunday Times. The Observer, The London Review of Books, The New York Times and The New Republic. He is a Fellow of the Royal Society of Literature and the Welsh Academy.

== Teaching ==
Maxwell has taught at Amherst College, Princeton, Columbia, NYU and The New School in the USA, and at The Universities of Warwick and Essex in the UK. He currently teaches on the M.A. at The Poetry School in London.
