= Felicity Wren =

British actress

- Born: Felicity Smith
- Origin: United Kingdom
- Occupation: Actress
- Years active: 1996 – present

Felicity Wren is a British actress.

== Biography ==
Felicity co-founded the Unrestricted View Theatre company in 1997. Unrestricted View became the resident company at the Hen and Chickens Theatre in Islington, London in 1999. Felicity was joint awarded Best Venue Manager by the Fringe Report in 2005.

Felicity performed as Mary in Glyn Maxwell's The Lifeblood of 2001.

== Filmography ==
- Tales of Uplift and Moral Improvement (2001)
- LoveTalk (2009)
- I of the Lost (2010)
- The Battle of Hogwarts (2011)
- Arm's Length (2011)
- 40 Point Plan (2012)
- Swag Town (2021)
