= Elena Langer =

Russian composer

Elena Langer (born 1974 in Moscow) is a Russian-born British composer of opera and other contemporary classical music. Her work has been performed at the Royal Opera House, Zurich Opera, Carnegie Hall, Richard B. Fisher Center for the Performing Arts, Stanislavski and Nemirovich-Danchenko Moscow Academic Music Theatre, Shakespeare's Globe, Wigmore Hall, Opera national du Rhin, Strasbourg, and Milton Court, Barbican Centre. She studied piano and composition at the Gnessin State Musical College in Moscow and composition at the Moscow Conservatoire; in 1999 she moved to London and studied composition at the Royal College of Music (1999–2000) with Julian Anderson and the Royal Academy of Music (2001–03) with Simon Bainbridge.

== Career ==
In 2002 Langer became the first Jerwood Composer in Association at the Almeida Theatre in London, writing the short operas Ariadne (premiered at the Almeida Opera Festival in 2002) and The Girl of Sand (2003), both settings of librettos by poet Glyn Maxwell. Ariadne was further performed at the Tanglewood Festival and the Britten and Strauss Festival in Aldeburgh in 2009, as well as at the Moscow Conservatoire.

In 2009 her song cycle Songs at the Well, based on Russian folk texts, was performed at the Carnegie Hall, New York.

Her next collaboration with Maxwell, a short dramatic piece called The Present, won the Audience Prize at the Zurich Opera House's New Opera Festival in January 2009. The work concerned the case of a patient suffering from Alzheimer's disease. Langer and Maxwell went on to develop this into the opera The Lion's Face, which enjoyed a successful tour around England and Wales (including 4 performances at the Linbury Studio, Royal Opera House, Covent Garden) in a production by John Fulljames for The Opera Group. This work also initiated an ongoing collaboration between The Opera Group and the Institute of Psychiatry, and involved Professor Simon Lovestone, director of the institute's Biomedical Research Centre, in a consultant role.

Langer was subsequently commissioned by Dawn Upshaw to compose a one-act comic opera for performance at Bard College in upstate New York. The resulting work, Four Sisters, to a libretto by John Lloyd-Davies, was performed in March 2012 at the Richard B. Fisher Center for the Performing Arts at Bard College.

In December 2012 Songs at the Well, with additional newly composed music, was dramatized by Dmitri Belyanushkin and staged at the Stanislavski and Nemirovich-Danchenko Music Theatre, in a double-bill with Lera Auerbach's The Blind.

In 2012–2013, using the surviving vocal score, Langer re-orchestrated César Cui's 1913 opera Puss in Boots (Кот в сапогах) for the Grand Théâtre de Genève, for performance in May 2013.

Her song-cycle for soprano, counter-tenor and baroque chamber ensemble, Landscape with Three People, based on poems by Lee Harwood, was performed at Concerts at Cratfield in August 2013.

In 2014 Shakespeare's Globe commissioned incidental music from Langer for David Eldridge's play Holy Warriors, about the 12th-century struggle for Jerusalem, during the Second Crusade, between Saladin and Richard the Lionheart.

In 2015, in response to a commission from the Britten Sinfonia for an orchestral piece, Langer wrote Story of an Impossible Love, which was performed in Cambridge and London in 2016, and subsequently in Calgary and Karlsruhe, where it was conducted by Justin Brown.

Welsh National Opera commissioned a sequel to The Barber of Seville and The Marriage of Figaro, to be performed together as a trilogy in the company's Spring 2016 programme. The libretto of Figaro Gets a Divorce was written by David Pountney, and the opera was premiered in Cardiff in February 2016, with designs by Ralph Koltai and conducted by Justin Brown. The main roles were sung by Marie Arnet (Susanna), Elizabeth Watts (Countess Almaviva), Mark Stone (Count Almaviva) and Alan Oke (The Major). The opera subsequently toured around the UK and in 2017 was performed at the Teatr Wielki in Poznań and at the Grand Théâtre, Geneva, with a live stream on the Arte Channel in Switzerland. The opera was scheduled for performances at Theater Magdeburg from 22 January 2022.

In 2016, a CD of small-scale vocal and chamber works, entitled Landscape with Three People, was released by Harmonia Mundi. Besides the title track the CD also contains Ariadne, Elena's first collaboration with Glyn Maxwell, and the light-hearted Cat Songs, based on the absurdist poetry of Daniil Kharms.

The 2017 London Piano Festival commissioned a piece for two pianos, to be played by Charles Owen and Katya Apekisheva. Inspired by Kuzma Petrov-Vodkin's 1912 painting Bathing of a Red Horse, Langer wrote the duet RedMare.

Rhondda Rips It Up!, a music-hall/vaudeville about the suffragette Margaret Haig Thomas. was commissioned by Welsh National Opera and premiered in Newport in May 2018. Starring Madeleine Shaw and Lesley Garrett, the piece toured to 16 venues around the UK.

In 2018, the Boston Symphony Orchestra commissioned a piece for a chamber ensemble composed of ten principals the orchestra's sections; the result, Five Reflections on Water, five contrasting pieces thematically linked, was performed in March 2019.

With a libretto by David Pountney, Langer's next piece, Beauty and Sadness, a chamber opera based on the 1964 novel by Yasunari Kawabata, was premiered at the Lyric Theatre, Hong Kong Academy for Performing Arts, in April 2019, directed by Carolyn Choa, designed by Tim Yip and conducted by Gergely Madaras.

Independent Opera commissioned a song cycle to be performed by young prize-winning singers at the company's Scholars' Recital. With lyrics by Glyn Maxwell, It's Not You, It's Me received its premiere at the Wigmore Hall in October 2019.

An orchestral suite derived from Figaro Gets a Divorce was premiered by the Seattle Symphony Orchestra, conducted by Maxim Emelyanychev, in January 2020. The suite was premièred in the UK in Glasgow in February 2020, performed by the BBC Scottish Symphony Orchestra conducted by Gergely Madaras. The suite received its Japanese premiere in September 2021, played by the Yomiuri Nippon Symphony Orchestra at the Tokyo Metropolitan Theatre.

Langer's comic opera based on Nikolai Erdman's 1928 play The Suicide is scheduled to be performed by Netherlands Reisopera in Holland and Buxton International Festival in the UK in 2026.

== Selected works ==
- Transformations for violin and piano, 1996
- The Prayer for violin and Jewish male choir, 1999
- Havdala for Jewish male choir, 1999
- Triste Voce for viola solo, 2001
- Platch for violin and string orchestra, 2001
- Ariadne, mono-opera, 2002
- The Girl of Sand, opera, 2003
- Two Cat Songs after Daniil Kharms for soprano, cello and piano, 2006
- The Evening Flower for two guitars, 2006
- Second Movement for oboe, violin and string orchestra, 2008
- Songs at the Well, song-cycle for soprano and orchestra, 2009
- The Lion's Face, opera, 2010
- Four Sisters, opera, 2012
- Songs at the Well (expanded), song cycle for singers and orchestra, 2012
- Landscape with Three People, song cycle for soprano, counter-tenor and baroque ensemble, 2013
- Story of an Impossible Love for orchestra, 2015
- Figaro Gets a Divorce, opera, 2016
- RedMare for two pianos, 2017
- Rhondda Rips It Up!, cabaret opera, 2018
- Five Reflections on Water for chamber orchestra, 2019
- Beauty and Sadness, chamber opera, 2019
- Orchestral suite from Figaro Gets a Divorce, 2020
