= David Bruce (composer) =

British composer and YouTube performer

- Born: 1970 (age 55–56); Stamford, Connecticut
- Education: University of Nottingham; Royal College of Music; King's College London
- Occupations: Composer; YouTuber

YouTube information
- Channel: David Bruce Composer
- Years active: 2009–present
- Subscribers: 275.0 thousand
- Views: 17.6 million
- Website: www.davidbruce.com

David Bruce (born 1970) is a British composer and YouTuber.

== Early life ==
Bruce was born in Stamford, Connecticut in 1970, but grew up in England. He began his undergraduate music studies in 1988 at the University of Nottingham, where his composition tutors included Jim Fulkerson and Nicholas Sackman. He continued at the Royal College of Music from 1991 to 1993, where he obtained a master's degree in composition, studying with Timothy Salter and George Benjamin. He received a PhD in composition at King's College London between 1995 and 1999, under the supervision of Harrison Birtwistle.

== Career ==
Bruce developed an international reputation as a composer. His work is performed by musicians from around the world, including soprano Dawn Upshaw, klezmer pioneer Giora Feidman and the St. Lawrence String Quartet. Upshaw in particular played an important role in bringing Bruce's music to wider attention. She instigated the commission for his opera A Bird in Your Ear and performed his Piosenki song-cycle at Carnegie Hall and elsewhere. Upshaw was the soloist in a new song-cycle with ensemble, The North Wind was a Woman, commissioned for the Gala opening of the 2009 season by the Chamber Music Society of the Lincoln Center.

His work Gumboots was commissioned by Carnegie Hall for clarinetist Todd Palmer and the St Lawrence String Quartet. His Groanbox was written for New York's Metropolis Ensemble featuring The Groanbox Boys. He wrote Caja de Musica for Concert Artists Guild Winner Bridget Kibbey's Carnegie Hall debut.

Bruce's one-act opera A Bird in Your Ear (2008) was commissioned by Bard College and later had performances by New York City Opera as part of the 2009 Vox festival; as a finalist in the National Opera Association's Chamber Opera competition 2008 and with students at New York University. The New York Times described A Bird in Your Ear as "skillfully written and imaginative".

Bruce's earlier chamber opera Push! was commissioned by the Genesis Foundation and premiered by Tête à Tête in London and went on tour in the UK in 2006. Push! was Critic's Choice for 2006 in both The Telegraph and Classical Music Magazine. Other commissions include a series of mini-operas – Out of the Ordinary, for The Opera Group, Has it Happened Yet? (2002) for ENO Studios and Tête à Tête; Seven Tons of Dung for Tête à Tête (1999); incidental music to the Trestle Theatre Company's show The Smallest Person (2004); and instrumental pieces for the London Sinfonietta, BBC Symphony Orchestra, the Presteigne Festival and the Lake District Summer Music Festival.

In 2011, another commission for Carnegie Hall, the octet Steampunk, was premiered by Ensemble ACJW at Skidmore College.

In the 2013/14 season Bruce was Associate Composer of the San Diego Symphony, for whom he wrote three pieces, including Night Parade for the orchestra's highly anticipated Carnegie Hall debut in October 2013; and the violin concerto Fragile Light for Gil Shaham for 2014. In 2018, Bruce was commissioned by the BBC Proms to write Sidechaining a concerto for four soloists and orchestra.

In 2012–13 Bruce was Composer-in-Residence with the Royal Opera House, who co-commissioned with Glyndebourne the opera Nothing (after the book by Janne Teller), which premiered in Glyndebourne in February 2016. Nothing received repeat performances in Aarhus, Denmark, and in 2020 a new production of the opera came to Royal Danish Opera in Copenhagen. Bruce's chamber opera The Firework Maker's Daughter (after the Philip Pullman story) toured the UK and New York in 2013 and was shortlisted for both the British Composer Awards, and the 2014 Olivier Awards for Best New Opera Production. It was revived for a 27-performance run at ROH Lindbury Studios in December 2015.

Other chamber works include two pieces written for mandolinist Avi Avital, Cymbeline and Death is a Friend of Ours; as well as The Consolation of Rain written for Camerata Pacifica and The Lick Quartet for the Dover Quartet, which was co-commissioned by Dallas Chamber Music Society and The Concertgebouw in Amersterdam.

In 2020 The London Philharmonic Orchestra commissioned a new piece for guitarist Milos and orchestra, which was due to premiere in 2021, but was delayed due to injury.

in 2021 Bruce's first piece for choir and organ was commissioned by Well Cathedral for premiere in October 2021.

=== YouTube channel ===
David Bruce started a YouTube channel in November 2009. Starting in November 2017, he began to upload educational videos about different aspects of music, usually focusing on traditional western Classical music, but also exploring other genres and traditions, and initiated collaborative composition projects with fellow YouTubers such as Adam Neely, Ben Levin, Martin Keary and Nahre Sol. The channel has over 300,000 subscribers.

=== Other activities ===
In addition to his work as a composer and YouTuber, Bruce is the founder of the sheet music website 8notes.com. 8notes.com provides a mix of public domain and original sheet music arrangements and has become a widely used resource for music education.

== Recognition ==
- Lili Boulanger Memorial Award in 2008, after a nomination by Osvaldo Golijov (a previous nomination in 1998 came from Sir Harrison Birtwistle);
- Royal Philharmonic Society Composition Competition in 1994
- Selected as one of twenty composers to participate in the New Music 20x12 project as part of the London 2012 Cultural Olympiad. The resulting work, Fire, premiered at Salisbury International Arts Festival on 26 May 2012.

== Selected works ==
=== Operas ===
- Push! (chamber opera) (2006)
- A Bird in Your Ear (one-act opera) (2008)
- The Firework-Maker's Daughter (chamber opera) (2013) libretto by Glyn Maxwell, Premièred at Hull Truck in March 2013 and toured the UK and New York in April and May 2013. It was revived at Royal Opera House, December 2015.
- Nothing (opera) (2015) libretto by Glyn Maxwell, based on the novel by Janne Teller. Co-commissioned by Glyndebourne and Royal Opera House. Premiered at Glydebourne on 25 February 2016

=== Chamber works ===
- 2 Baka Studies (mixed ensemble) (1992)
- Contradance (string ensemble) (1993)
- Crosswinds (chamber ensemble) (1995)
- Flowers in Stone (chamber ensemble) (1997)
- Carrow (violin, cello, clarinet, piano) (1998)
- Piosenki (soprano, baritone and ensemble) (2007)
- Gumboots (clarinet quintet) (2008)
- Gigue (flute and harp) (2008)
- Dances for Oskar (string quartet) (2008)
- The North Wind was a Woman (soprano and ensemble) (2009)
- Groanbox (mixed chamber orchestra w/ banjo and accordion) (2009)
- Saudades (clarinet, accordion, and string quartet) (2010)
- Tears, Puffes, Jumps and Galliards (sopranino, soprano and tenor recorder; string quartet) (2010)
- The Eye of Night (flute, harp, viola) (2011)
- Steampunk (mixed octet) (2011)
- The Given Note (clarinet, violin, guitar, bass, cello) (2011)
- Forgotten Boots (clarinet and piano) (2012)
- Cymbeline (mandolin and string quartet) (2013)
- The Consolation of Rain (oboe, cello, harp, percussion) (2016)
- Kundalee (clarinet, cello, viol) (2018)
- The Lick Quartet (string quartet) (2019)
- Out of Hours (soprano voice, bass voice and string septet) (2019)

=== Orchestral works ===
- Laughter Through Tears (klezmer ensemble of clarinet, violin and string orchestra) (2010)
- Two Dowland Laments (mezzo-soprano and string orchestra) (2011)
- Prince Zal and the Simorgh (symphony orchestra with narrator) (2012)
- Night Parade (symphony orchestra) (2013) commissioned by San Diego Symphony. Premiered at Carnegie Hall on 29 October 2013.
- Violin Concerto "Fragile Light" (violin and symphony orchestra) (2014)
- Fanfarrón (symphony orchestra) (2017)
- Sidechaining (symphony orchestra) (2018)
- The Peacock Pavane (guitar and orchestra) (2020)
- Lully Loops (violin and string orchestra) (2023) commissioned by Zurich Chamber Orchestra.
- Na Thymithoume (soprano, children's choir, large orchestra (2024) commissioned by Thessaloniki State Symphony Orchestra.

=== Other works ===
- Caja de Musica (solo harp) (2009)
- Sports et Divertissements (arrangement of Satie, for chamber ensemble or chamber orchestra) (2010)
- Fire (large choir, four horns) (2012) commissioned by The Opera Group. One of 20 pieces commissioned for the UK Cultural Olympiad '20x12' series. Premiered in May 2012 at Salisbury Festival
- Cut the Rug, commissioned by Silk Road Ensemble and recorded on the album 'A Playlist without Borders' (Sony). Première at Carnegie Hall on 16 October 2013.
- That Time with You, commissioned by Carnegie Hall and Kelley O'Connor. For mezzo-soprano Kelley O'Connor. Première at Carnegie Hall on 29 October 2013.
- Undula (solo piano) (2017)
- Reggae masta (2013)
