= Hen and Chickens Theatre =

Pub theatre in Highbury, London, England

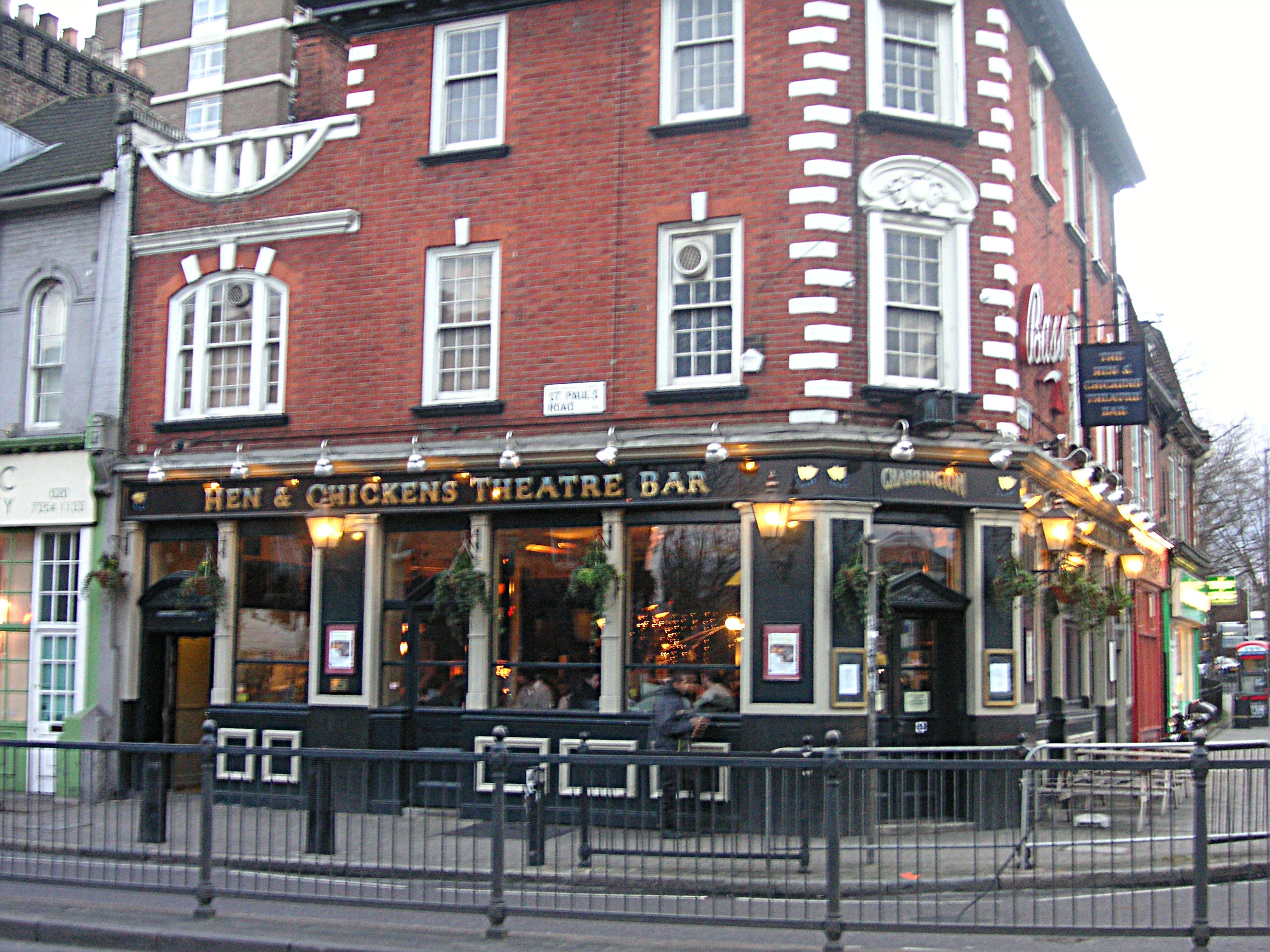
- The Hen and Chickens Theatre
- Interactive map of Hen and Chickens Theatre
- Address: St. Paul's Road; Islington; London, N1; United Kingdom
- Coordinates: 51.546111°N 0.101667°W
- Capacity: 54
- Type: Pub theatre
- Production: Visiting productions
- Public transit: Highbury & Islington

Website
- thehenandchickenstheatrebar.co.uk

The Hen and Chickens Theatre is a fringe venue for theatre and comedy situated above a pub at Highbury in the London Borough of Islington. It was created in the function room above the Hen & Chickens pub in 1986 by Tony Heywood, who was previously Associate Director at The Overground Theatre in Kingston and The Gate Theatre in Notting Hill. It was originally called The Corner Theatre, situated as it was directly opposite Highbury Corner station. When it opened in July 1986 with the musical, Barnstormers, written by Mich Binns and directed by Tony Heywood, it was arguably one of the most comfortable fringe venues in London, with 54 raked seats that were acquired from the old Palace Pier Theatre in Brighton.

The theatre management was awarded to actress Felicity Wren in 1999.
