= Deutsches Kinder- und Jugendtheatertreffen =

Deutsches Kinder- und Jugendtheatertreffen is a theatre festival in Berlin, Germany.
