= Savyon Liebrecht =

Israeli writer

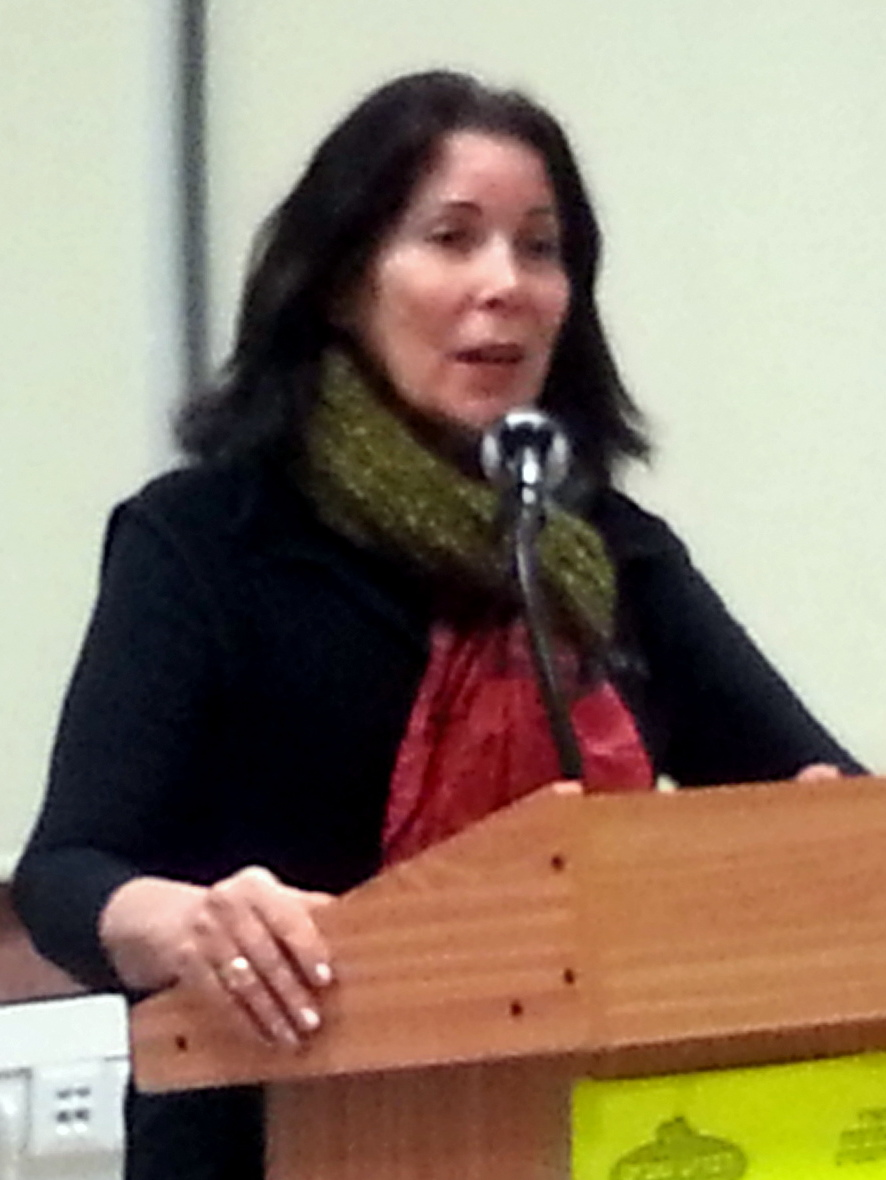
Savyon Liebrecht

Savyon Liebrecht (Hebrew: סביון ליברכט; born 13 January 1948) is an Israeli author, playwright and screenwriter. She was born in Munich, Germany, to Polish Holocaust survivors as Sabine Sosnowski, the eldest of three children. She emigrated to Israel in 1950.

== Early life and education ==
Liebrecht studied journalism in London, United Kingdom, for one year and received a baccalaureate from Tel Aviv University. In 1971, Liebrecht married, and in 1977 she had a daughter and, later, a son. At Tel Aviv University she studied philosophy and literature. She lives in Tel Aviv.

== Literary career ==
Liebrecht began publishing in 1986, when her first story collection, Tappuḥim min ha-Midbar (Apples from the Desert), appeared. It was followed by the collections Susim al Kevish Gehah (Horses on the Highway, 1988), Sinit Ani Medabberet Elekha (It's All Greek to Me, He Said to Her, 1992), Ẓarikh Sof le-Sippur Ahavah (On Love Stories and Other Endings, 1995), Nashim mitokh ha-Katalog (Mail Order Women, 2000) and Makom Tov la-Laylah (A Good Place for the Night, 2002). Her novels include Ish, Ishah ve-Ish (1998; A Man and a Woman and a Man), about a married woman who has a brief affair with a man she meets in the geriatric ward where their parents are hospitalized, and Ha-Nashim shel Abba (2005; The Women My Father Knew). Her books have been translated into nine languages. Stories by Liebrecht appear in anthologies including the Oxford Book of Hebrew Short Stories (1996) and Nothing Makes You Free: Writings by the Descendants of Jewish Holocaust Survivors (2002).

== Themes ==
Liebrecht's recurring themes include the lives of Holocaust survivors in Israel, women's experiences as wives and mothers, tensions between Orthodox and secular Israelis, and relationships between individual Arabs and Israelis. Her work is informed by feminism and often depicts women struggling against marginalization in Israeli society. Many of her stories concern survivors and children of survivors, and characters trying to understand how historical events shaped their lives and families. The three novellas of Mail Order Women explore the relationships that develop when a foreign woman, such as a Filipino caregiver or a Polish girl, enters the life of an Israeli family.

== Plays and adaptations ==
Liebrecht has written a number of plays, all of which have been staged, as well as television scripts. Most of her plays are dramatic versions of her own stories. They include Sonia Mushkat (1998), I'm Talking to You in Chinese (2004), Apples from the Desert (2006), The Banality of Love (2009), Rochaleh's Wedding (2010) and Horses on the Highway (2012).

Three of her works have been adapted for television: Purple Lawns (1998), Diana's Child (2004) and The Banality of Love (2013). Two have been made into feature films: Valentina's Mother (2008), based on a novella, and Apples from the Desert (2014), based on a short story and a play. The latter, directed by Matti Harari and Arik Lubetzky, follows a young Orthodox woman in Jerusalem who runs away to a kibbutz.

The Banality of Love, a play about the relationship between Hannah Arendt and Martin Heidegger, was adapted into an opera by the Israeli composer Ella Milch-Sheriff, with a German libretto by Liebrecht. Die Banalität der Liebe premiered at the Theater Regensburg in January 2018, directed by Itay Tiran.

== Awards ==
Liebrecht received the Alterman Prize in 1987 and the Prime Minister's Prize in 1991 and 1999. In Italy she received the Amelia Rosselli Prize for Mail Order Women (2002) and the Maior-Amalfi Award (2005), and in France the WIZO Prize (2009) for A Good Place for the Night. She has also received awards for two of her television scripts. Her plays won Play of the Year at the Israeli Theater Awards for I'm Talking to You in Chinese (2004), Apples from the Desert (2006), The Banality of Love (2009) and Rochaleh's Wedding (2010).

== Works ==
Her published works include:

- Apples from the Desert: Selected Stories, Feminist Press, 2000 ISBN 978-1-55861-235-8
- A Man and a Woman and a Man: A Novel, Persea Books, 2003, ISBN 978-0-89255-297-9
- A Good Place for the Night: Stories, Persea Books, 2006, ISBN 978-0-89255-320-4
- The Women My Father Knew: A Novel, Persea Books, 2010, ISBN 978-0-89255-356-3
- Horses on the Highway: Stories, Crown, 1988, ISBN 978-9650703288
