= Interplay Europe =

Interplay Europe is a festival for young playwrights in Europe. It is organized by Interplay; an international, not-for-profit arts organisation for the furtherance of young playwrights aged 18 to 26. It was founded in Sydney in 1985. Every two years Interplay organises the largest and most prestigious festival of its kind, World Interplay, in Australia.

Every other year a European country hosts Interplay Europe. The first Interplay Europe was held in 1995 in Mainz organized by the playwrights Antje Rávic Strubel and Tobias Rausch and Interplay Europe e.V became official in 1998, which was also in Berlin. Participants from all over Europe discuss their plays for two inspiring, practical and creative weeks in classes, workshops, forums and events with experienced international tutors. Through workshops and small-scale productions, they have the opportunity to improve their work. Interplay also supports international youth exchange and seeks to contribute to better understanding between nations.

Interplay Festivals are held in order to:

- celebrate the creative richness of young playwrights
- provide an international meeting place where their work can be discussed, workshopped and performed
- provide an international forum for the ideas of young playwrights
- offer the general public access to the works of young writers
- contribute to regional, national and international cultural development.

== Alumni ==
Many highly respected and international award-winning European playwrights started their career with Interplay. For example: Ivana Sajko and Tena Stivicic from Croatia, Katharina Schlender and Kristo Šagor from Germany, Ali Taylor and Sarah Kane from the United Kingdom, Enver Husicic and Esther Gerritsen from the Netherlands, Vera Filo and Anna Haraszti from Hungary, Darja Stocker and Simon Froehling from Switzerland and Ignacio Pajón Leyra and Antonio Rojano from Spain.

== Interplay festival 2006 ==
Date: 18–25 June

Town: Schaan

Country: Liechtenstein

DELEGATIONS

Bulgaria: Ana Vaseva

Croatia: Nora Krstulovic (tutor), Maja Sviben

England: Ola Animashawun (tutor), Daniel Stathis Barker, Tinuke Asher Craig, Hannah Dee

Germany: Henning Fangauf (tutor), Kristo Šagor (tutor), Martin Kordic, Frauke Scheffler, Agnes Gerstenberg

Hungary: Judit Cziraki (tutor), Marianna Koncz

Latvia: Inta Bernova (tutor), Gunita Grosa, Eliza Sternberga, Daina Tabuna

Liechtenstein: Patrick Boltshauser (tutor), Peter Beck, Caroline Herfert

Netherlands: Jurrie Kwant (tutor), Hubert Roza (tutor), Enver Husicic, Maaike Johanna Bergstra, Radna Diels, Florian Pieter van Kuijk

Norway: Kim Atle Hansen

Scotland: Alan Wilkins (playwright) (tutor), Rachel Lynn Brody, Lewis Hetherington

Slovakia: Vanda Feriacova (tutor), Diana Kacarova, Pavol Kohut

Slovenia: Dragica Potocnjak (tutor), Sasa Rakef

Spain: Antonio Rojano, Ignacio Pajón Leyra

Switzerland: Miriam Ehlers (tutor), Anna Papst, Laura de Weck

Turkey: Hasan Erkek (tutor), Fatma Kandemir

== Interplay festival 2008 ==
Date: 5 July-13 July

Town: Utrecht

Country: Netherlands

DELEGATIONS

Australia:Lachlan Philpot (tutor), Adam Mitchell (tutor), Anna Barnes

Croatia: Ivor Martinić

Denmark: Janicke Branth (tutor), Kristin Auestad Danielsen, Julie Maj Jacobsen, Caroline Cecilie Malling Joergensen, Katrine Hald Troensegaard, Brian Wind-Hansen, Thomas Markmann

England: Phil G. Davies, Rosa Connor, Issy McCann

France: Adeline Picault, Alban Ketelbuters

Germany: Henning Fangauf (tutor), Kristo Sagor (tutor), Azar Mortazavi-Manesh, Roman Senkl

Greece: Chara Bakonikola (tutor), Paraskevi Pouli, Marina Danezi

Hungary: Upor Laszlo (tutor), Márton Kiss

Iceland: Thordis Elva Thorvaldsdottir (tutor), Tyrfingur Tyrfingsson

Latvia: Lauris Gundars (tutor), Elvijs Cakans, Inga Liepa

Netherlands: Jurrie Kwant (tutor), Don Duyns (tutor), Gijsje Kooter (tutor), Jannemieke Caspers, Michiel Lieuwma, Malou De Roy van Zuydewijn, Babiche Ronday, Jelmer Soes, Anna Maria Versloot, Milou Brockhus, Esther Duysker, Timen Jan Veenstra

Poland: Aneta Wróbel-Wojtyszko (tutor), Ewa Wikiel, Sylwia Wojas

Russia: Benjamin Slivkin (tutor), Yulia Yakovleva, Dmitry Egorov

Scotland: Alan Wilkins (tutor), Joanne Toner, Jonathan Whiteside

Spain: Ignacio Pajón Leyra

Sweden: Dag Thelander

Switzerland: Simon Froehling (tutor), Noo Steffen

Turkey: Hasan Erkek (tutor), Cigdem Yildirem, Huseyin Gucumen

== Interplay festival 2012 ==
Date: 2 July-7 July

Town: Madrid

Country: Spain

DELEGATIONS

Austria: Holger Schober (tutor), Kevin Oseanu,

Bulgaria: Stefan Prohorov

Germany: Henning Fangauf (tutor), Fine Riebner, Claudia Brueggemann

Greece: Nikolas Marmaras

Hungary: David Adam

Latvia: Rasa Bugavituçe, Edgars Nicklason

Netherlands: Maud Lazaroms (tutor), Rineke Roosenboom, Eva Gouda, Helena Hoogenkamp

Poland: Adam Biernacki (tutor), Paulina Danecka, Joanna Tyszka

Spain: Ignacio Pajón Leyra (tutor), José Cruz (tutor), Jorge Padín (tutor), Diana I. Luque (tutor), Manuel Benito, José Aurelio Martín, Nieves Rodríguez,

Sweden: Anna Berg (tutor), Johanna Svalbake, Gunnar Ericcson

Turkey: Hasan Erkek (tutor), Cagil Tekten, Ali Birkan Teke

== Host towns ==
Year	Town	Country	Artistic Director
1995	Mainz	Germany	Antje Rávic Strubel, Tobias Rausch
1998	Berlin	Germany	Henning Fangauf
2000	Warsaw	Poland	/
2002	Pecs	Hungary	/ Judit Cziráki
2004	Athens	Greece	Nikos Kamtsis
2006	Schaan	Liechtenstein	Henning Fangauf
2008	Utrecht	Netherlands	Hubert Roza
2010	İzmir	Turkey	Hasan Erkek
2012	Madrid	Spain	Ignacio Pajón Leyra, José Cruz
2014	Bregenz	Austria	Henning Fangauf
2016	Ljungskile	Sweden	Niklas Malmcrona
2018	Liepāja	Latvia	Lauris Gundars

== External links and References ==
- World Interplay website
- Interplay Europe website
- Interplay Europe 2008
- Interplay Europe 2014
- Interplay Europe 2016
