= Theater der Zeit =

German-language theatre magazine

Theater der Zeit is a German-language monthly magazine that focuses on theatre and politics. It was established in 1946 and is now—alongside Theater heute—one of the leading magazines on theatre in the German-speaking world. In 1996, the Theater der Zeit publishing house began to publish books.

== History ==
Following its establishment in summer 1945, Bruno Henschel & Sohn publishers (later Henschelverlag Kunst und Gesellschaft) commissioned journalist Fritz Erpenbeck to establish a magazine on theatre. In July 1946, the first issue of Theater der Zeit appeared. Max Reinhardt was on the cover, Erpenbeck's lead article was entitled "Zeittheater oder Theater der Zeit?" ("Historical theatre or theatre of history?"). Until March 1992, the magazine appeared on a monthly basis, with short periods at the beginning of the 1950s and 1960s when it appeared fortnightly. To start with, Theater der Zeit provided information about theatre in the fledgling German Democratic Republic (GDR, AKA East Germany) and abroad. From the early 1950s, however, the magazine increasingly came under the ideological influence of the State Commission for Affairs of the Arts, the precursor of the GDR Ministry for Culture. Only after de-Stalinisation in the mid-1950s was the magazine open to critical discussions—but still dependent on political climate and control.

With the establishment of the Association of Theatre Professionals in the GDR in December 1966, the aim of which was to shape the theatre scene by means of self-control in line with socialist ideology, the magazine's editorship was handed over to the association. The Henschelverlag retained responsibility for personnel, print, and distribution. Although this ultimately increased political pressure on the magazine, editors were able to strengthen their networks within the theatre scene by attending colloquia and festivals and by travelling abroad. As a result, Theater der Zeit increased its practical relevance, thereby strengthening its reputation and increasing its print run in the 1970s and 1980s.

Following the fall of the Berlin Wall and reunification, the editors elected Martin Linzer as their new editor-in-chief. Practical relevance continued to be the main aim of the magazine, with Theater der Zeit slowly opening itself up to the theatre scene in the old states of the former West Germany. Nevertheless, a drastic drop in the number of copies printed could not be prevented. Even a reduction in personnel, an increase in the cover price, and a new layout could not offset the subsidies that had once been paid by the GDR Ministry for Culture. With no alternative for the Henschelverlag than to stop production, the last magazine appeared in March 1992.

In May 1992, several former employees of the magazine set up a special interest group under the name of the former magazine. In May 1993, the group produced the first issue of Theater der Zeit. Die Zeitschrift für Theater und Politik under the editorship of Martin Linzer. Having been completely reworked, the magazine initially appeared every two months. Since 2000, the magazine has once more been published on a monthly basis. Members of the magazine's advisory board include artists and researchers such as Friedrick Dieckmann, Erika Fischer-Lichte, and Heiner Goebbels. The magazine's current editor-in-chief, Harald Müller, have been in position since 2007 (2007-07/2014 with Frank Raddatz).

== Today ==
Alongside the regular monthly publication, the magazine has released a number of special issues, such as the July 2008 special issue that spoke out for the preservation of the opera house of the Berlin State Opera as designed by Richard Paulick. International theatre is one of the main editorial foci. Each September issue is published in two languages and contains the portrait of a specific country. To date, these issues have focused on theatre in Finland (2014), The Netherlands and Flanders (2013), London (2012), Iran (2011), Cuba (2010), South Africa (2009), Chile (2008), Canada (2007), Japan (2006), France (2005), Mexico (2004), Italy (2003), the Baltic States (2002), the Netherlands (2001), Poland (2000), and Russia (1999).

== Book publishers ==
Since 1996, Theater der Zeit has published books on theatre-relevant subjects. The first publication was the work book Kalkfell on the occasion of the death of the German playwright, Heiner Müller. Since then, the "work books" have appeared on an annual basis as a double issue in July/August as part of the regular annual magazine subscription. Furthermore, the publisher has around 200 titles in its back catalogue. About 40 new books are published each year; they include several book series that focus on e.g. personal portraits, theatrical training, plays, scientific research, and architecture.

== Editors-in-chief ==
- since 2020: Dorte Lena Eilers
- 2014-2019: Harald Müller
- 2007-2014: Harald Müller, Frank M. Raddatz
- 2005–2007: Nina Peters
- 1946–1959: Fritz Erpenbeck
- 2001–2003: Thomas Irmer
- 1999–2000: Thomas Irmer, Barbara Engelhardt
- 1991–1999: Martin Linzer
- 1974–1990: Hans-Rainer John
- 1970–1974: Manfred Nössig
- 1966–1970: Horst Gebhardt
- 1963–1966: Manfred Nössig
- 1961–1963: Hans-Rainer John
- 1959–1961: Fritz Marquardt
