= Charlie Owen (footballer) =

Australian rules footballer

Personal information
- Full name: Charles Joseph Owen
- Born: 23 April 1887; Fitzroy, Victoria
- Died: 13 June 1956 (aged 69); Northcote, Victoria
- Original team: Clifton Hill Wesleys
- Height: 171 cm (5 ft 7 in)

Playing career^{1}
Years	Club	Games (Goals)
1907–08	Fitzroy	14 (11)
- ^{1} Playing statistics correct to the end of 1908.

Charles Joseph Owen (23 April 1887 – 13 June 1956) was an Australian rules footballer who played with Fitzroy in the Victorian Football League (VFL).
