= Nothing (novel) =

2010 fiction novel by Janne Teller

- First edition (Danish)
- Author: Janne Teller
- Original title: Intet
- Publisher: Dansklærerforeningens
- Publication date: 2000
- ISBN: 1-416-98579-4

Nothing is a fiction novel by Danish author Janne Teller published in 2000. It was published on February 9, 2010, by Atheneum Books for Young Readers.

== Plot ==
Danish 7th grader Pierre Anthon tells his classmates about his existential dread. Upon doing so, he leaves school, returning to his home, where he lives with his dad. He takes residence in a plum tree.

Agnes, the narrator, decides to work with her classmates in an attempt to convince Pierre that life has a purpose, and to convince him to give up living in the plum tree in favor of returning to school. The classmates decide to create a "heap of meaning," which is a collection of one personal sacrifice from each participant. The participants choose items based on personal meaning. A classmate named Dennis begins the heap by giving up his Dungeons and Dragons books, and then challenges another classmate Sebastian to give up his fishing rod. Sebastian complies, and asks Laura to sacrifice her earrings, which she does.

The classmates begin to see the heap as a game, asking "Who can sacrifice the most meaningful item for the heap?" Agnes is forced to sacrifice her new sandals, and as a result she forces Gerda to sacrifice her pet hamster. The children begin to sacrifice darker and darker things, including their virginity, their fingers, and additional animals. Law Enforcement and the media get involved, and the heap begins to receive national coverage. The classmates sell the heap to a museum for $3.6 million.

Pierre is still not convinced, citing the sale of the heap as rendering it meaningless. Sofie begins to wreak havoc, causing the entire group of classmates to break out into violence. Agnes flees the unfolding violence and pleads with Pierre to give up his existential dread and come down from the tree, which he agrees to. He comes to see the bloody violence, and scolds the classmates as being idiotic. He is then murdered, and the novel ends with Agnes reflecting back upon the events.

== Reception ==
The novel has received various awards, including a nomination for the Garden State Teen Book Award.

The book has been adapted into an opera of the same name, which was performed at the Glyndebourne opera house in 2016, as well as a film directed by Trine Piil Christensen in 2022.
