= Alan Wilkins (playwright) =

Scottish playwright (1969–2022)

- Born: 1969
- Died: 7 September 2022 (aged 52)
- Writing career
- Notable work: Carthage Must Be Destroyed
- Notable awards: Best New Play; Critics' Awards for Theatre in Scotland

Alan Wilkins (1969 – 7 September 2022) was a Scottish playwright.

His first professionally produced play was Ball or Scoop, which opened at the Benaki Museum in April 2004 and then toured the Highlands and islands of Scotland. The play was set in a Highland bothy and featured five hill walkers sheltering from a storm. He received the Critics' Awards for Theatre in Scotland Best New Play Award in 2008 for Carthage Must Be Destroyed, and has since had two other plays produced.

== Life and career ==
Wilkins was born in 1969, and brought up in Edinburgh. Before his professional debut as a playwright, he worked as an actor and taught English as a Foreign Language in Poland and Spain.

Whilst in Spain, he wrote his first play, Childish Things. He sent it to the Traverse and it received a public reading. Encouraged, he wrote his second play, Cafeteria/Restaurant, which received a reading at the Tron Theatre in Glasgow. The Traverse commissioned him to write The Nest, which became his first produced play.

At the time of his debut, Wilkins was working as a drama teacher at Inverkeithing High School, Edinburgh. His next play Carthage Must Be Destroyed, set in a 2nd-century Roman bathhouse, opened at the Traverse in May 2007 and explored the themes of "power, politics, and decadence, set against the improbable background of the Third Punic War, in 149BC." and won the Critics' Awards for Theatre in Scotland (CATS) Best New Play award for 2007–2008. The citation said "'A mature, meaty, engrossing drama about power, politics and decadence, Alan Wilkins Carthage Must Be Destroyed was a gripping indictment of the corruptions of Empire." It was also produced by the Theatre Royal in Bath.

In 2008, Wilkins scripted Can We Live With You? for Lung Ha's theatre company, which works with people with learning disabilities. The play was performed at the Traverse in April 2008. Offshore, produced by Birds of Paradise, was a play set against the background of the decline of the Scottish fishing industry and its effect on small communities. Wilkins used his own background, working as a barman in Wester Ross, as background material. It played in Edinburgh and on tour in the autumn of 2008.

Wilkins also taught on the Masters of Literature programme at the University of Glasgow and is a doctoral student at that institution. In 2008, he led a play-writing course for inmates at Polmont young offenders' institution, the results of which were performed at the Traverse in December 2008.

Wilkins also worked with Dundee Repertory Theatre, the Aldeburgh Festival and was funded by the Scottish Arts Council to represent his country as a tutor / playwright at the 2006 Interplay Festival in Liechtenstein.

Wilkins died on 7 September 2022, at the age of 52.

== Works ==
Wilkins had four plays produced.

Title	First produced	Year	First publisher	Year	ISBN
The Nest	Traverse Theatre	2004	Nick Hern Books	2004	ISBN 978-1-85459-817-2
Carthage Must Be Destroyed	Traverse Theatre	2007	Nick Hern Books	2007	ISBN 978-1-85459-985-8
Can We Live With You?	Traverse Theatre	2008	–	–	–
Offshore	Glasgow Citizens Theatre	2008	–	–	–
