= Israel Theater Prize =

Annual award (1995–2018)

The Israel Theater Prize (Hebrew: פרס התיאטרון הישראלי) was an annual award issued for achievements in Israeli theatre by the Israeli Theater Prize Association during 1995–2018. In 2018, directors of the major theatres announced the dissolution of the association and the cessation of the award, citing controversies around it and budgetary difficulties. The directors promised to formulate the new definition of the prize.

There were categories of awards for achievements of individuals in major theatre occupations, including the Lifetime Achievement award, as well as for several categories of acts.

Currently the common cultural prize is the Israel Prize.
