= Charles Owen (pianist) =

British classical pianist

Charles Owen (born 1971) is a British classical pianist.

== Biography ==
Charles Owen was born in Cambridge and grew up in Hampshire and Worcestershire. The eldest of four children, his father is a Church of England clergyman and his mother a school teacher and archivist. He is the brother of John Owen, the Chief Designer of the Mercedes Formula 1 team.

After lessons from his first teacher, a pianist in his father's congregation, he won a scholarship to the Yehudi Menuhin School where he studied under Seta Tanyel and collaborated with many fellow students, including Katharine Gowers and Paul Watkins.

Owen went on to study with the distinguished Russian pianist Irina Zaritskaya at the Royal College of Music, where he won the Chappell Gold Medal. This was followed by further studies with leading British pianist Imogen Cooper. Owen credits these two pianists as a major influence on shaping his own approach to the piano and music-making in general.

Owen won the silver medal at the Scottish International Piano Competition in 1995, the Parkhouse Award in 1997 and was a finalist in the Piano Section of BBC Young Musician of the Year in 1988.

In 2011, Owen entered into a civil partnership with his long-term Australian partner Jason Groves.

== Career ==
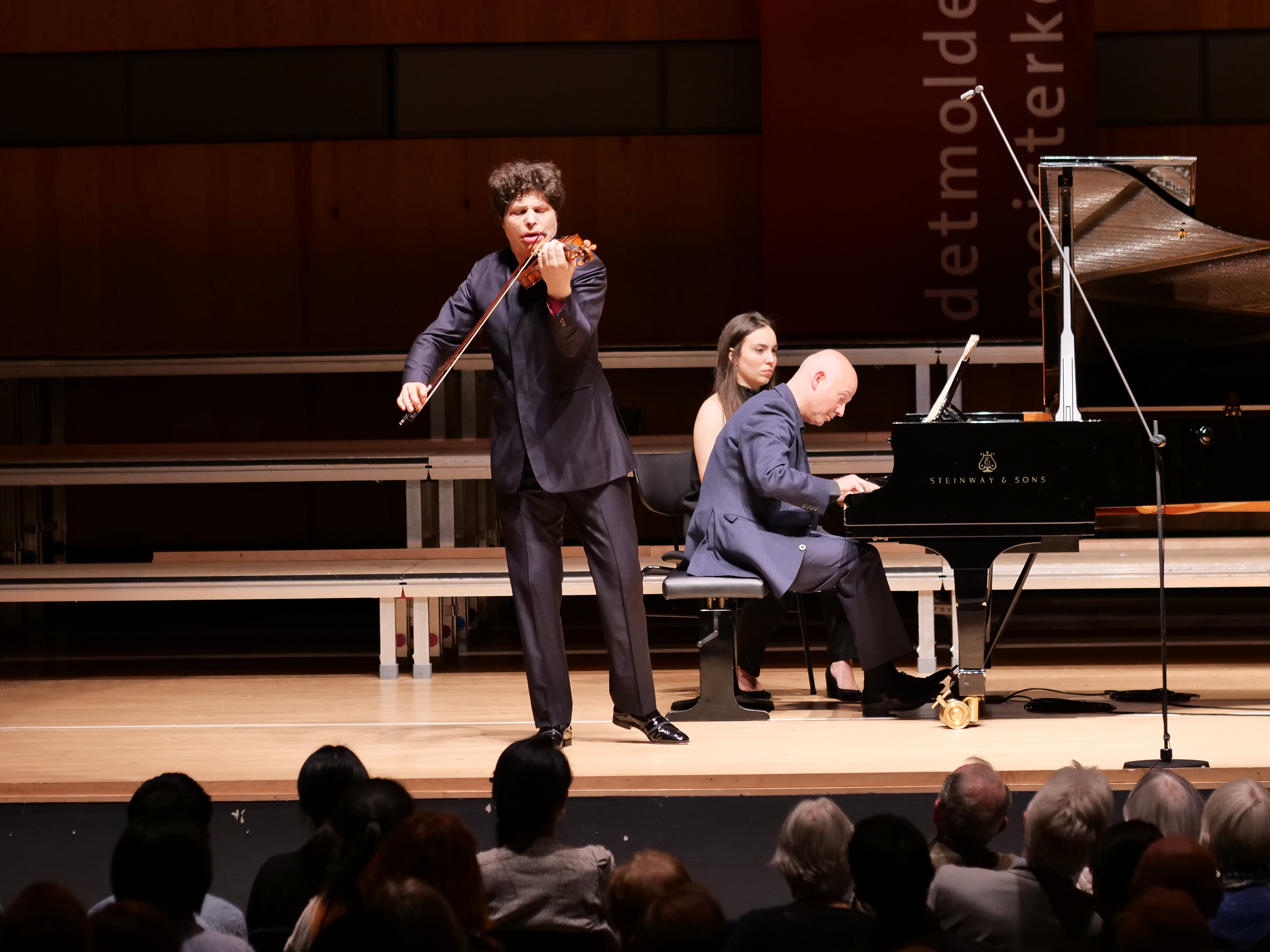
Owen at piano in performance with violinist Augustin Hadelich, 2022

Owen has performed in major concert venues around the world, including the Barbican Centre, Queen Elizabeth Hall, Wigmore Hall, Kings Place, Bridgewater Hall, the Sage Gateshead, Symphony Hall, Birmingham, the Lincoln Center, Carnegie Hall, the Brahms Saal in Vienna's Musikverein, Musée d’Orsay, and Moscow Conservatoire.

He regularly appears at festivals such as the Aldeburgh Festival, Bath International Music Festival, Cheltenham Music Festival, Leicester International Music Festival, Perth Festival and the Ryedale festival.

Owen has performed concertos with world-renowned orchestras including the Philharmonia Orchestra, Royal Scottish National Orchestra, The Hallé, Aurora Orchestra and London Philharmonic Orchestra. He has collaborated with leading conductors such as Sir Mark Elder, Ryan Wigglesworth, Nicholas Collon and Martyn Brabbins.

Owen's chamber music partners include Julian Rachlin, Chloë Hanslip, Augustin Hadelich, Nicholas Daniel, the Vertavo String Quartet, Takacs Quartet and the Elias Quartet. He also has a piano duo partnership with Katya Apekisheva.

== Recordings ==
Owen's solo recordings comprise discs of piano music by J.S. Bach, Brahms, Fauré, Janáček and Poulenc. He has recorded chamber music with Natalie Clein and Katya Apekisheva.

Owen recorded the world premiere of Jonathan Dove‘s Piano Quintet with the Sacconi Quartet, selected as Recording of the Month by Gramophone Magazine in August 2017.

== Teaching and Masterclasses ==
Owen is a professor of Piano at the Guildhall School of Music & Drama in London and a visiting professor at the Royal Welsh College of Music & Drama in Cardiff.

In 2016, he was appointed Steinway & Sons UK Ambassador, a role which includes regular masterclasses at Steinway Hall and visits to many of the UK's leading independent schools including Eton College, Winchester College & Westminster School, among others.

== London Piano Festival ==
Owen is the co-Artistic Director of the London Piano Festival, an annual celebration of the piano held at Kings Place, with his regular duo partner Katya Apekisheva.

The duo created the Festival in 2016 and have commissioned piano works from composers Nico Muhly and Elena Langer as part of the Festival.

== Discography ==
Brahms, Late Piano Music Op 76/79/116-119 (Avie Records, 2018)

Rachmaninov, The Two Piano Suites & Six Morceaux, Op11 - Katya Apekishava (Avie Records, 2017)

Jonathan Dove, In Damascus, Piano Quintet – Sacconi Quartet, Mark Padmore (Signum Classics, 2017)

Stravinsky, Piano Ballets – Petrushka & The Rite of Spring - Katya Apekisheva (Quartz, 2016)

J. S. Bach, The Six Keyboard Partitas (Avie, 2016)

Fauré, The Complete Barcarolles (Avie, 2011)

Fauré, The Complete Nocturnes (Avie, 2008)

Rachmaninov & Chopin, Cello Sonatas - Natalie Clein (EMI, 2006)

Brahms & Schubert, Cello Sonatas - Natalie Clein (Classics for Pleasure/ EMI, 2004)

Poulenc, Piano Music (Somm, 2003)

Janáček, Piano Music (Somm, 2002)
