= Theater & Orchester Heidelberg =

Theatre and opera house in Heidelberg, Germany

Coordinates: 49°24′38″N 8°42′13″E

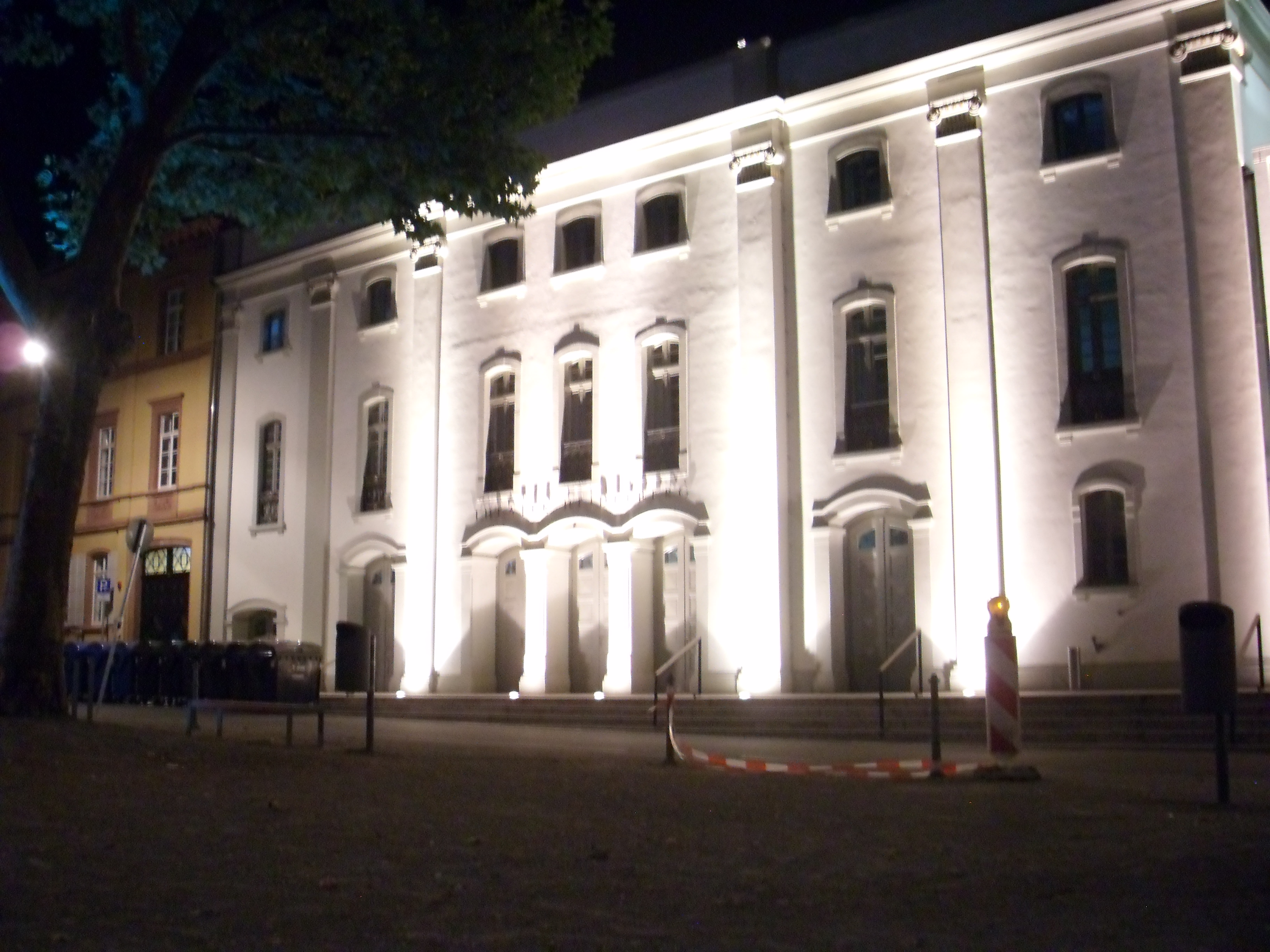
An image of Theater & Orchester Heidelberg

Theater & Orchester Heidelberg is a theatre in Heidelberg, Baden-Württemberg. The Heidelberger Stückemarkt, an annual theatre festival and competition for emerging playwrights, is held at the theatre.

== Temporary closure 2006-2009 and renovation 2009-2012. ==
In 2006, the theater was closed due to significant structural deficiencies. In August 2009, work began on the renovation of the theater and a new theater building. This was made possible in part by an extraordinary civic commitment, in particular a major donation from Heidelberg entrepreneur Wolfgang Marguerre. The total cost was nearly €60 million, about €19 million of which was donated, with Marguerre alone contributing €15 million. The building's New Hall was named after him.
