= Janne Teller =

Danish author (born 1964)

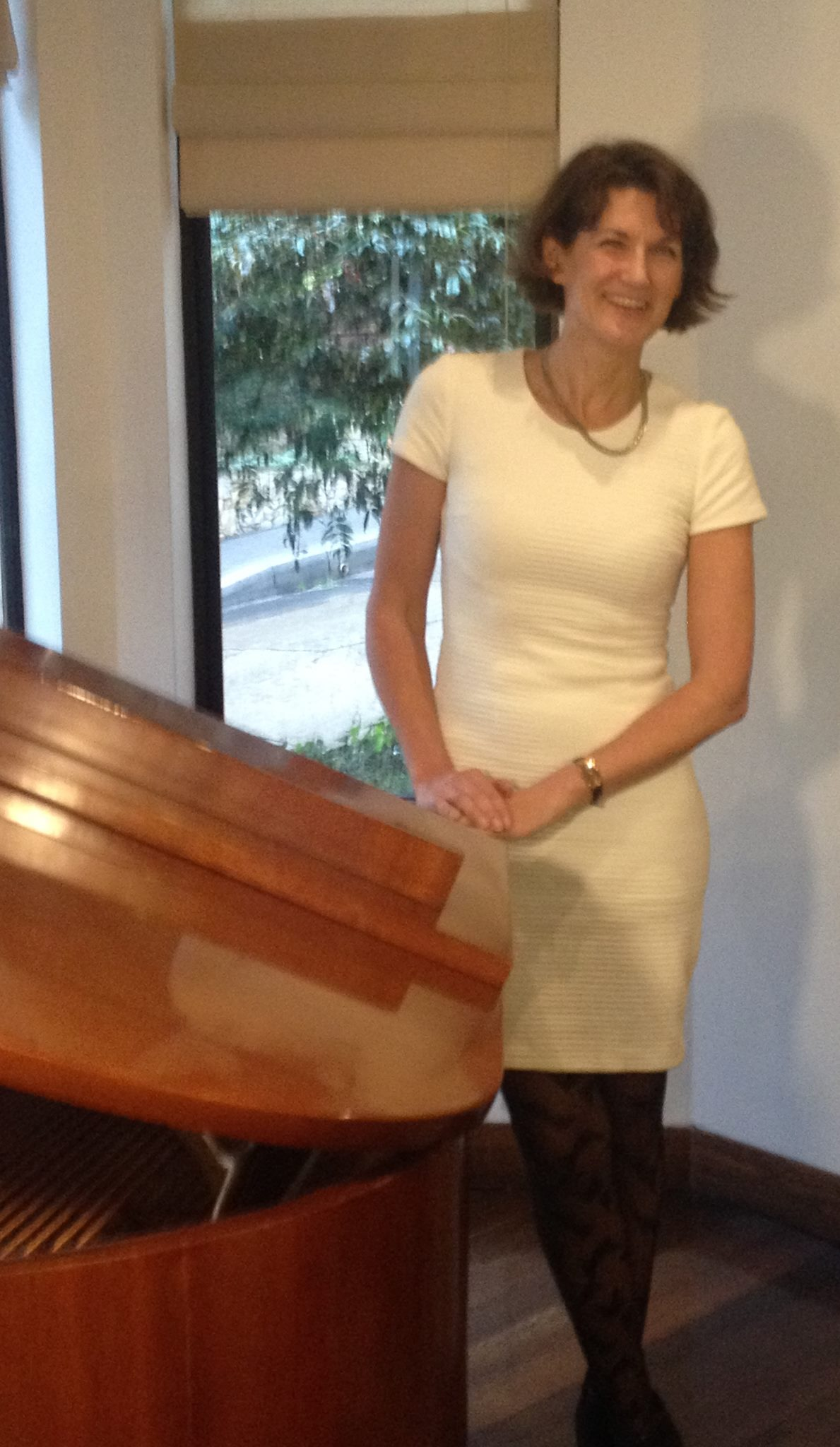
- Janne Teller in Bogota, Colombia, 2016
- Born: 8 April 1964 (age 62); Copenhagen, Denmark
- Occupations: Novelist and essayist
- Writing career
- Period: 1999–present
- Website: janneteller.com

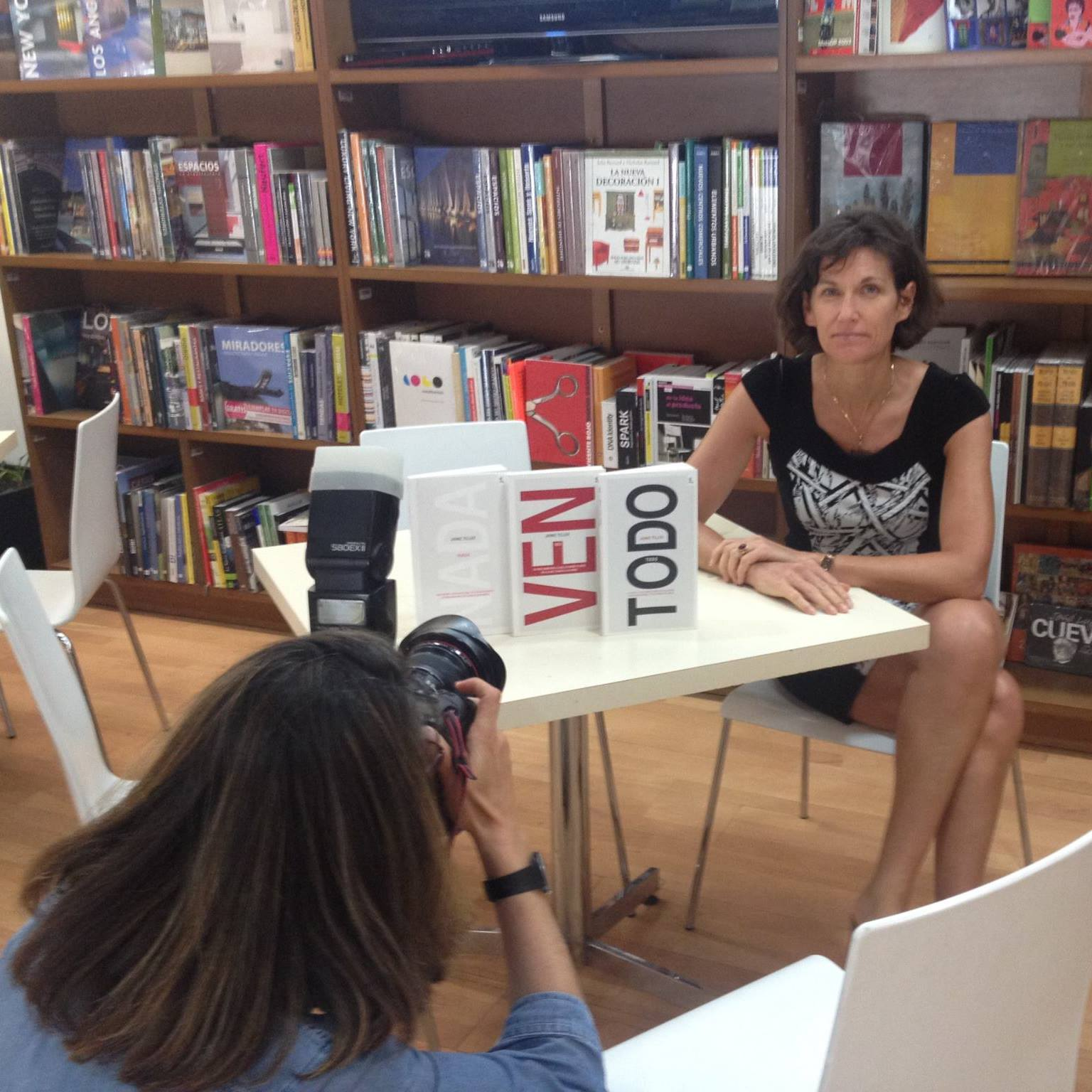
Janne Teller in Mexico City, 2016

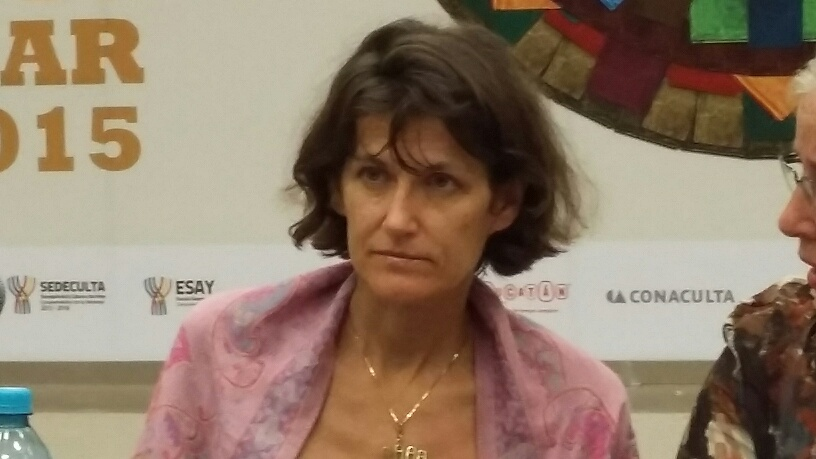
Janne Teller at Yucatan's international book fair, Mérida, March 2015

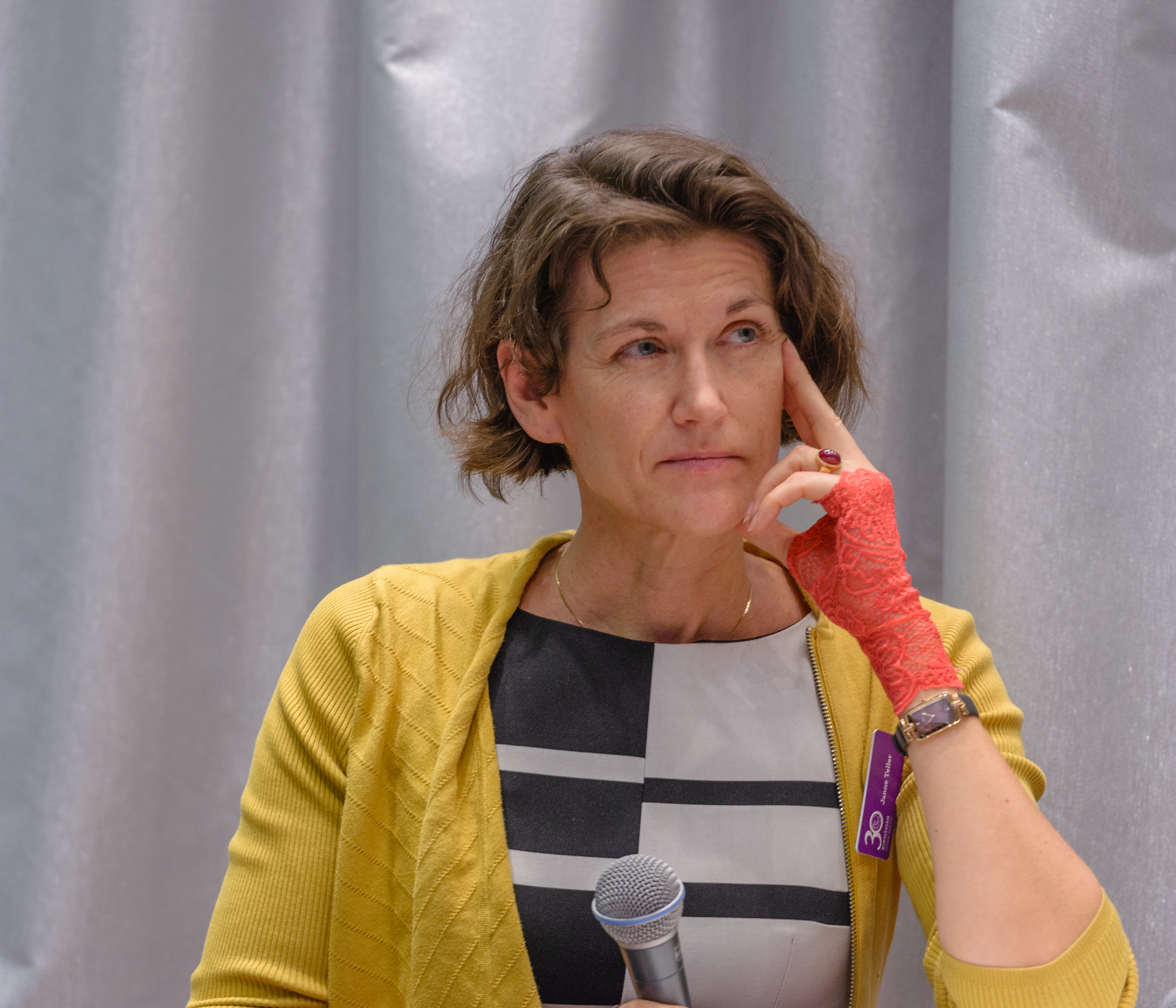
Janne Teller at Göteborg Book Fair, 2014

Janne Teller (born 8 April 1964 in Copenhagen) is a Danish writer of Austrian–German descent, who lives in New York and Berlin.

Before she became a full-time writer she used to work as a conflict advisor for EU and UNO, mostly in Africa.

== Literature ==
Janne Teller's literature, consisting of mainly novels and essays, but also short stories – as well as various works for young adults – always focuses on larger existential perspectives of life and human civilization and often sparks controversial and heated debates. She has received many literary awards, and her work is translated over 25 languages.

Janne Teller's novels cover a wide variety of contemporary and philosophical issues. They include the highly praised modern Nordic saga Odin's Island (1999), dealing with religious and political fanaticism; Europa (2004), about European identity and the binds of history in love and war; and Come (2008), about ethics in art and modern life. Her essays cover existential and ethical perspectives of modern life, and include 'Between the Lines' (Lettre International, 2012), "Europe, who do you want to be?" (Die Welt, 2012) and 'Little Brother is watching you' (Cicero, 2010).

She's furthermore thought to have revolutionized the young adult novel with her existential Nothing (Danish Intet), first published in Denmark in 2000, earned critical acclaim and caused widespread controversy in Scandinavia. It was initially banned, but has since risen as an international bestseller and is today considered a neo-classic by numerous critics worldwide. The novel's main character, the boy Pierre Anthon, proclaims to his classmates that life is meaningless, sitting in a plum tree. They feel an urge to show Pierre Anthon some proof that there is meaning in life, which ultimately leads to violence amongst the children. A German as well as an English translation of Intet were published in 2010. The novel received several awards, among them a Michael L. Printz Honor Book for the English edition in 2011 and the Danish Ministry of Culture's children book prize (Denmark) (Kulturministeriets Børnebogspris) in 2001 for the Danish edition. Her fictional essay War (2004), published in the shape of a passport on life as a refugee, has also generated widespread debate, particularly in Europe. Janne Teller published her first short story in the Danish Daily, Berlingske Tidende, at the age of 14.

== Petition against mass surveillance ==
In December 2013, Teller helped organise a petition of 560 world-renowned contemporary authors, protesting against mass surveillance in the wake of the Edward Snowden revelations. Several Nobel laureates were signatories to the open appeal to governments, corporations and the United Nations

== Background ==
Originally educated as a macro economist, Janne Teller worked for the United Nations and the European Union in conflict resolution and humanitarian issues around the World, particularly in Africa. She devoted herself full-time to fiction writing in 1995.

For several years, she was a member of the Board of the Danish Fiction Writers’ Association and of Danish PEN, as well as of the Editorial Board of the Danish version of the intellectual magazine, Lettre International.

She has lived in a wide variety of places from Brussels, Paris, Milan, to Dar es Salaam and Maputo. Presently, she resides in New York City.

== Prizes ==
- Drassow's Prize, Denmark 2014, literary works towards peace & human understanding
- Peter Pan Prize, Silverstar, Sweden 2013
- Teskedsordnen, Sweden 2012, anti-fanaticism prize
- Michael L. Printz Award, USA 2011, for literary excellence
- Mildred L. Batchelder Award, USA 2011
- Die Zeit, Luchs Preis, Germany, August 2010
- Le Prix Libbylit 2008, best children's novel of the year published in French, Rien
- Cultural Ministry's Prize, Denmark 2001, best children's book of the year, Intet
- Tamgha-e-Pakistan by the President of Pakistan, March 23, 2021, for supporting the people of Jammu & Kashmir

== Published works ==
=== Fiction ===
- Everything, short story collection (2014)
- African Roads, novella (2013)
- Nothing, novel (2010)
- Come, novel (2008)
- Europa, novel (2004)
- The Trampling Cat, novel (2004)
- War, What if it Were Here, novel (2004)
- Odin's Island, novel (1999)

Other books:

- Why?, Short story, education booklet, Gyldendal 2007

Original story in French: Le Monde de l’Education, France, 2002

- Write Your Devil, (co-editor and contributor), People’sPress, 2004

=== Non-fiction ===
Essays:

- ’Am I a European?’, Der Tagesspiegel, Germany (June 2018)
- ’Between Good and Evil’, Institute of Art and Ideas 2017, UK (2017) & Weekendavisen, Denmark (2018)
- ’European Hygge ’, Göttinger Tageblatt Sonntag, Germany (December 2016)
- ’Thank God for the Burden of History 2016’, FAZ Germany (2016) & Politiken Denmark (2016)
- ’The Human Compass: When Extremism Becomes the North Star’, Institute of Art & Ideas, UK & Information Denmark (2016)
- ’Ode to a Land - Anthology: American Writers on Palestine’, Or Books, US (2015)
- ‘Tea with Turgenjev’, FAZ, Germany, (2014)
- ‘The Golden Future of the Non-Gilded European Youth’, Cicero, Germany, (2014)
- ‘Du hast die Wahl’, Austausch Kulturmagasin, Germany (2013)
- ‘Schreiben für den jungen Menschen in uns’, Voland & Quist, Germany (2013)
- ‘Vox Populi: Money Talks’, Max Joseph, Germany (2013)
- ‘Europa. Wer bist Du? Wer möchtest Du sein?’, Politiken, Denmark (2012); Die Welt, Germany (2012)
- ‘Zwischen die Zeilen’, Lettre Internationale, Germany (2012)
- ‘Der Spion Nebenan’, Cicero, Germany (2011)
- ‘Long live Denmark’, Politiken, Denmark, (2009)
- ‘The Power of Art, the Art of Power’, Politiken, Denmark (2009)
- ‘Why no Guru is a True Guru’, Corriere della Sera, Italy (2007)
- ‘On Quality and Literature’, Danish Teachers’ Magazine, Denmark (2007)
- ‘To See the One Who Sees You’, Exhibition at Kunstforeningen GL Strand in Copenhagen, Denmark (2006)
- ‘May Allah have Mercy on Our Country’, Information, Denmark (2006)
- ‘Walking Naked’, Lettre Internationale, Denmark (2005)
- ‘Our Different Realities’, Lettre Internationale, Denmark (2005)
- ‘Doubt’, Politikens Forlag, Denmark (2005)
- ‘Between the Lines’, Information, Denmark (2005)
- ‘The Poverty Law’, Brøndums Danske Lov, Brøndums Forlag (2000)
