= John Fulljames =

English opera director (born 1976)

John Fulljames (born 1976) is an English opera director who was the director of the Royal Danish Opera from 2017 to 2022. He was Associate Director of Opera at the British Royal Opera from 2011 to 2017. A Cambridge University graduate in Physics, he grew up in Birmingham and Kenya. In 1997, he co-founded The Opera Group, of which he was artistic director before assuming his position at the Royal Opera. In November 2022, Fulljames was appointed as the inaugural Director of Oxford University's Humanities Cultural Programme.
