= World Interplay =

World Interplay is the largest festival of young playwrights in the world. It is the peak activity of the Interplay organisation, and is held for two weeks every two years in Townsville, Australia. The first World Interplay was held in Sydney in 1985.

== Overview ==
The 10th festival was held 3–17 July 2007. The 2007 Festival Director was the Australian theatre director David Berthold.

The 11th Festival was held in Cairns, QLD 2009. The 2009 Festival Director was Australian theatre director Kate Gaul.

40 playwrights aged between 18 and 26 came from across Australia, China, Croatia, England, Finland, Germany, Hungary, Indonesia, Kenya, the Netherlands, New Zealand, Papua New Guinea, the Philippines, Singapore, Switzerland, Turkey, and the USA. They were joined by senior directors and dramaturgs from ten nations for two weeks of workshops, forums and cultural exchange. The acclaimed Australian writer Louis Nowra delivered the opening address.

At World Interplay 2003 and 2005, playwrights came from nations such as Bulgaria, Cambodia, Croatia, the Czech Republic, England, Finland, Germany, Ghana, Greece, Hungary, Iceland, Japan, Kenya, Mexico, the Netherlands, New Zealand, Scotland, South Africa, Switzerland, the U.S., Venezuela, and Vietnam, as well as Australia.

World Interplay is supported by the Australia Council, Arts Queensland, Townsville City Council, James Cook University, and the Department of Foreign Affairs and Trade (Australia). Long term partner organisations include the Royal Court Theatre and the Utrecht School of the Arts.

== Interplay Europe ==
Interplay Europe is held in alternate years to World Interplay, and involves young playwrights from across Europe. The first Interplay Europe was held in 1995. in Berlin and Interplay Europe e.V became official in 1998., which was also in Berlin.

Interplay Africa held festivals in 1994 and 1996, and has worked in other areas since.

== See also ==
- List of festivals in Australia
