= Lists of Australian television episodes =

This is a list of lists of Australian television episodes.

== Animated ==
- List of The Berenstain Bears (1985 TV series) episodes
- List of Blinky Bill episodes
- List of Dennis the Menace and Gnasher (2009 TV series) episodes
- List of The Dukes of Broxstonia episodes
- List of Johnson and Friends episodes
- List of Kitty Is Not a Cat episodes
- List of Kuu Kuu Harajuku episodes
- List of Round the Twist episodes

== Children ==
- List of Bananas in Pyjamas episodes
- List of Bluey episodes
- List of Dance Academy episodes
- List of Dennis the Menace and Gnasher (2009 TV series) episodes
- List of The Elephant Princess episodes
- List of The Ferals episodes
- List of H2O: Just Add Water episodes
- List of Hi-5 episodes
- List of Hi-5 House episodes
- List of Jeopardy episodes
- List of Johnson and Friends episodes
- List of Mako: Island of Secrets episodes
- List of My Place episodes
- List of Nowhere Boys episodes
- List of Ocean Girl episodes
- List of Pirate Islands episodes
- List of Play School episodes
- List of Prank Patrol (Australian TV series) episodes
- List of Round the Twist episodes
- List of The Saddle Club episodes
- List of Skippy the Bush Kangaroo episodes
- List of The Sleepover Club episodes
- List of Thunderstone episodes

== Comedy ==
- List of The Chaser's War on Everything episodes
- List of The Ferals episodes
- List of Frontline (Australian TV series) episodes
- List of The Games episodes
- List of Good News Week spin-off series episodes
- List of Good News Week episodes
- List of House Husbands episodes
- List of Kath & Kim episodes
- List of Gruen episodes
- List of Mother and Son episodes
- List of Mustangs FC episodes
- List of The Nation episodes
- List of Packed to the Rafters episodes
- List of Round the Twist episodes
- List of The Secret Life of Us episodes
- List of Spicks and Specks episodes
- List of Thank God You're Here episodes
- List of Upper Middle Bogan episodes
- List of The Wedge episodes
- List of Wilfred (Australian TV series) episodes

== Drama ==
- List of All Saints episodes
- List of Beastmaster episodes
- List of Bed of Roses episodes
- List of Blue Heelers episodes
- List of A Country Practice episodes
- List of Dance Academy episodes
- List of The Doctor Blake Mysteries episodes
- List of Doctor Doctor (Australian TV series) episodes
- List of East West 101 episodes
- List of The Elephant Princess episodes
- List of Farscape episodes
- List of The Flying Doctors episodes
- List of H2O: Just Add Water episodes
- List of Heartbreak High episodes
- List of Homicide episodes
- List of House Husbands episodes
- List of Jeopardy episodes
- List of The Lost World episodes
- List of Love Child episodes
- List of Mako: Island of Secrets episodes
- List of McLeod's Daughters episodes
- List of Miss Fisher's Murder Mysteries episodes
- List of Murder Call episodes
- List of Mustangs FC episodes
- List of Nowhere Boys episodes
- List of Ocean Girl episodes
- List of Offspring episodes
- List of Offspring: The Nurses webisodes
- List of Packed to the Rafters episodes
- List of A Place to Call Home episodes
- List of Please Like Me episodes
- List of Prisoner episodes
- List of Rush episodes
- List of The Saddle Club episodes
- List of Satisfaction episodes
- List of Sea Patrol episodes
- List of SeaChange episodes
- List of The Secret Life of Us episodes
- List of Sons and Daughters episodes
- List of The Strip episodes
- List of Tangle episodes
- List of Thunderstone episodes
- List of The Time of Our Lives episodes
- List of Underbelly episodes
- List of Water Rats episodes
- List of Wentworth episodes
- List of Winners & Losers episodes
- List of Wonderland episodes

== Non-fiction ==
- List of The Biggest Loser Australia episodes
- List of Can of Worms episodes
- List of Chris & Julia's Sunday Night Takeaway episodes
- List of The Crocodile Hunter episodes
- List of Deadly Women episodes
- List of Double the Fist episodes
- List of Drag Race Down Under episodes
- List of The Footy Show (AFL) episodes
- List of Gogglebox Australia episodes
- List of Good News Week spin-off series episodes
- List of Good News Week episodes
- List of Grand Designs Australia episodes
- List of Hard Quiz episodes
- List of Have You Been Paying Attention? episodes
- List of Highway Patrol (Australian TV series) episodes
- List of Gruen episodes
- List of The Living Room (TV series) episodes
- List of The New Inventors episodes
- List of The Real Housewives of Melbourne episodes
- List of The Real Housewives of Sydney episodes
- List of RocKwiz episodes
- List of Talkin' 'Bout Your Generation episodes
- List of The Weekly with Charlie Pickering episodes
