= No Pressure =

No Pressure may refer to:

== Film, television and theater ==
- No Pressure (2010 film), a British short film
- No Pressure (2024 film), a Polish romantic comedy film
- "No Pressure" (How I Met Your Mother), a 2012 TV episode
- "No Pressure" (Mustangs FC), a 2019 TV episode
- "No Pressure" (The Unicorn), a 2019 TV episode
- No Pressure, a 2014 stage work by Tali Avrahami

== Music ==
=== Albums ===
- No Pressure (Erick Sermon album), 1993
- No Pressure (Logic album), 2020
- No Pressure, by Dennis Eveland, 1993
- No Pressure, by Luniz, 2018
- No Pressure, a mixtape by Nipsey Hussle, 2017
- No Pressure, an EP by Deante' Hitchcock, 2017

=== Band ===
- No Pressure, a pop punk band fronted by The Story So Far's Parker Cannon

=== Songs ===
- "No Pressure", by C-Murder from Calliope Click Volume 1, 2009
- "No Pressure", by Classified from Greatful, 2016
- "No Pressure", by Crystal Kay and VivaOla, 2022
- "No Pressure", by Dana Williams, 2017
- "No Pressure", by Drebae, featuring Megan Thee Stallion, 2018
- "No Pressure", by French Montana from Jungle Rules, 2017
- "No Pressure", by James Zabiela, 2007
- "No Pressure", by Justin Bieber from Purpose, 2015
- "No Pressure", by the Kooks from Let's Go Sunshine, 2018
- "No Pressure", by KSI from All Over the Place, 2021
- "No Pressure", by Lemar from Dedicated, 2003
- "No Pressure", by Little Boots from Working Girl, 2015
- "No Pressure", by Mahalia, 2017
- "No Pressure", by Michael Wavves, 2015
- "No Pressure", by Nicole Morier, 2016
- "No Pressure", by Night Sun, a band featuring Curtis Harding, 2013
- "No Pressure", by Nina Zilli from Sempre lontano, 2010
- "No Pressure", by Paul Reiser and Helen Hunt from the Mad About You soundtrack, 1997
- "No Pressure", by Rockapella from Bang, 2010
- "No Pressure", by Rouge, 2017
- "No Pressure", by Waka Flocka Flame and Slim Dunkin from Twin Towers 2 (No Fly Zone), 2011
- "No Pressure", by Young Jeezy from Boss Yo Life Up Gang, 2013
