= The Strip (Australian TV series) =

- Genre: Drama
- Directed by: Shawn Seet; Zayed Rizwan; Ian Barry; Garth Maxwell
- Starring: Aaron Jeffery; Simone McAullay; Vanessa Gray; Bob Morley; Frankie J. Holden
- Country of origin: Australia
- Original language: English
- No. of seasons: 1
- No. of episodes: 13 (list of episodes)

Production
- Executive producer: Jo Horsburgh
- Producers: Steve Knapman; Kris Wyld
- Editors: Nicole LaMacchia; Deborah Peart
- Running time: 43–44 minutes
- Production company: Knapman-Wyld Productions

Original release
- Network: Nine Network
- Release: 4 September – 27 November 2008

The Strip is an Australian television drama series that screened on the Nine Network. The series premiered on the Nine Network at 8:30pm on 4 September 2008 but was moved to a later 10:30pm timeslot from 13 November 2008. The show did not return for a second season, due to disappointing ratings.

== Overview ==
The Strip is a police detective drama series that follows investigations into crimes on the Gold Coast, Queensland, colloquially referred to as "The Strip". Visually, the program took much inspiration from CSI: Miami and was filmed with images of sparkling surf, aerial shots of buildings and golden sands, as well as similar post production filters and colouring. It had a budget of A$7.8 million.

== Cast ==
=== Main ===
- Aaron Jeffery as Detective Jack Cross
- Vanessa Gray as Detective Frances "Frankie" Tully
- Simone McAullay as Plain Clothes Constable Jessica McCay
- Bob Morley as Plain Clothes Constable Tony Moretti
- Frankie J. Holden as Inspector Max Nelson

=== Guests ===
- Jay Laga'aia as Joe Tahoe / Frogman
- Martin Sacks as Keith Boswell
- Harold Hopkins as Bomber Davis
- Indiana Evans as China Williams
- Matthew Newton as Gregor Foxx
- Gillian Alexy as Cherry Cunningham
- Tahyna Tozzi as Cristal Cade
- Matt Boesenberg as Bernie Bedford
- Toby Truslove as Dayne Gibson
- Alyssa-Jane Cook as Sam Gleeson
- Fayssal Bazzi as Joe Abadi

== DVD releases ==
The Strip was released on DVD on 4 July 2009.

== See also ==
- List of Australian television series
