= List of The Strip episodes =

- No. of episodes: 13

Release
- Original network: Nine Network
- Original release: 4 September – 27 November 2008

The Strip is an Australian television show which aired from 4 September 2008 to 27 November 2008 on the Nine Network. The series was cancelled in November 2008, due to disappointing ratings. The series took much inspiration from CSI: Miami, with aerial shots of beaches and the ocean, and was filmed on location on the Gold Coast, Queensland.

== Cast ==
- Aaron Jeffery - Detective Jack Cross
- Vanessa Gray - Detective Frances "Frankie" Tully
- Simone McAullay - Plain Clothes Constable Jessica Mackay
- Bob Morley - Plain Clothes Constable Tony Moretti
- Frankie J. Holden - Inspector Max Nelson

== List of episodes ==
No. overall	No. in series	Title	Directed by	Written by	Original release date
1	101	"Woodchipper"	Shawn Seet	Michael Miller	4 September 2008
A window cleaner falls to his death, and the Main Beach CIB team are sent to investigate his murder.
2	102	"Murdered, Chopped Up, and Frozen"	Ken Cameron	Felicity Packard	11 September 2008
Body parts which have been frozen, then chopped up are found when spreading bark chip in a playground.
3	103	"Russian Entrepreneur"	Shawn Seet	Michael Miller	18 September 2008
A Russian man, Katz, is mysteriously murdered in his waterfront home.
4	104	"Schoolies"	Ken Cameron	Jeff Truman	25 September 2008
It's Schoolies Week at the Gold Coast, but it is cut short for friends of Zoe, who is found strangled and murdered in their apartment.
5	105	"Stolen Yacht"	Ian Barry	John Ridley	2 October 2008
A man is found dead in a yacht just off the coast, and the Main Beach CIB have little to go on except for the yacht's skipper, Terry.
6	608	"Footballers"	Shawn Seet	Tim Pye	9 October 2008
A man is shot dead in broad daylight by a sniper, and someone else's car is bombed, using military hardware.
7	107	"Weight Loss Queen"	Shawn Seet	David Ogilvy	16 October 2008
Football legend Blake Davis turns up dead in a hotel.
8	108	"Dead Model in a Hotel Room"	Ken Cameron	Margaret Wilson	23 October 2008
A young woman, Julie, who is the partner of Fiona Worth's son, turns up dead in a hotel room.
9	109	"House of Ill Repute"	Ian Barry	Justin Monjo	30 October 2008
Tully is enjoying her early morning run along the beach when she encounters a girl smeared with make-up. The girl takes her back up to a beachfront house and Tully discovers three murdered victims inside.
10	110	"Distractions"	Ken Cameron	Felicity Packard	6 November 2008
A rich property developer is discovered floating in the canal, and has been for the last few days.
11	111	"The Sonic Bikini in the Sand"	Garth Maxwell	John Ridley	13 November 2008
Local musician, Michelle Lewis, is found dead on the beach near Tweed Heads, and sparks fly when Tully and her old partner, "Johno", are forced to briefly collaborate on the case.
12	112	"Tied Up in a Red Suitcase"	Garth Maxwell	Tim Pye	20 November 2008
A young Japanese girl is found tied up in a suitcase, buried in the ground on the coast. Meanwhile, Cross is raged by Amy going against her promise to him and meeting up with Joel Barty for an interview. To be continued...
13	113	"Finale"	Shawn Seet	Tim Pye	27 November 2008
A disturbing phone call sees Cross and Tully race to Amy's apartment, only to find her missing, and one of Lazar's men poking around. After she is found dead later in the episode, the Main Beach CIB team must prevent Lazar from boarding his plane or else they will lose him forever. The Boss and Tully find Joel Barty to protest against Lazar, and they manage to stop Lazar from leaving Australia just before take-off.
