= List of Packed to the Rafters episodes =

The following is a list of episodes for the Australian television programme, Packed to the Rafters.

== Series overview ==
Series	Episodes	Originally released		DVD release date (Region 4)
Series	Episodes	First released	Last released	DVD release date (Region 4)
1	22	26 August 2008	24 March 2009	2 December 2009
2	22	30 June 2009	24 November 2009	3 November 2010
3	22	29 June 2010	16 November 2010	20 April 2011
4	22	8 February 2011	20 March 2012	28 March 2012
5	22	17 April 2012	16 April 2013	2 May 2013
6	12	23 April 2013	2 July 2013	7 November 2013

== Episodes ==
=== Season 1 (2008–09) ===
No. overall	No. in season	Title	Narrator	Directed by	Written by	Original release date	Australian viewers (millions)
1	1	"Packed to the Rafters"	Julie Rafter	Chris Martin-Jones	Anthony Ellis	26 August 2008	1.945
2	2	"Playing a Googly"	Dave Rafter	Chris Martin-Jones	Anthony Ellis	2 September 2008	2.045
3	3	"She Ain't Heavy"	Ben Rafter	Pino Amenta	Marieke Hardy	9 September 2008	1.960
4	4	"How Did We Get Here?"	Nathan Rafter	Pino Amenta	Margaret Wilson	16 September 2008	1.895
5	5	"Lines of Communication"	Julie Rafter	Lynn Hegarty	Anthony Ellis	23 September 2008	1.945
6	6	"Facing Demons"	Rachel Rafter	Lynn Hegarty	Marieke Hardy	30 September 2008	1.836
7	7	"Self-Made Man"	Nathan Rafter	Pino Amenta	Margaret Wilson	7 October 2008	1.979
8	8	"Taking the Lead"	Ben Rafter	Lynn-Maree Danzey	Marieke Hardy	14 October 2008	1.886
9	9	"Suburban Boy"	Dave Rafter	Pino Amenta	Dave Warner	21 October 2008	1.868
10	10	"All in the Planning"	Rachel Rafter	Lynn-Maree Danzey	Margaret Wilson	28 October 2008	1.926
11	11	"Away from It All"	Julie Rafter	Lynn Hegarty	Anthony Ellis	4 November 2008	2.067
12	12	"Removing the Block"	Ted Taylor	Lynn Hegarty	Anthony Ellis	11 November 2008	1.959
13	13	"Smile Through the Pain"	Dave Rafter	Chris Martin-Jones	Margaret Wilson	18 November 2008	2.013
14	14	"A Mother's Radar"	Julie Rafter	Chris Martin-Jones	Margaret Wilson	25 November 2008	1.824
15	15	"Natural Justice"	Julie Rafter	Nicholas Bufalo	Sue Hore	3 February 2009	1.874
16	16	"Having It All"	Rachel Rafter	Nicholas Bufalo	Marieke Hardy	10 February 2009	1.688
17	17	"Changes"	Ted Taylor	Lynn Hegarty	Dave Warner	17 February 2009	1.740
18	18	"House of Cards"	Ben Rafter	Marcus Cole	Abe Pogos	24 February 2009	1.833
19	19	"Over the Moon"	Dave Rafter	Marcus Cole	Chris Hawkshaw	3 March 2009	1.876
20	20	"Losing the Touch"	Julie Rafter	Lynn Hegarty	Abe Pogos	10 March 2009	1.817
21	21	"What a Difference a Year Makes"	Nathan Rafter	Chris Martin-Jones	Margaret Wilson	17 March 2009	1.887
22	22	"Don't Know What You've Got Till It's Gone"	Julie Rafter	Chris Martin-Jones	Anthony Ellis	24 March 2009	2.033

=== Season 2 (2009) ===
No. overall	No. in season	Title	Narrator	Directed by	Written by	Original release date	Australian viewers (millions)
23	1	"Look into My Eyes"	Julie Rafter	Pino Amenta	Marieke Hardy	30 June 2009	2.185
24	2	"Dodging the Issue"	Dave Rafter	Pino Amenta	Abe Pogos	7 July 2009	1.851
25	3	"Living by the List"	Rachel Rafter	Lynn Hegarty	Margaret Wilson	14 July 2009	1.794
26	4	"Glittering Prizes"	Nathan Rafter	Lynn Hegarty	Anthony Ellis	21 July 2009	1.857
27	5	"Brave New World"	Dave Rafter	Cherie Nowlan	Chris Hawkshaw	28 July 2009	1.926
28	6	"Little Arrows"	Ted Taylor	Cherie Nowlan	Dave Warner	4 August 2009	1.880
29	7	"Belonging"	Sammy Rafter	Pino Amenta	Margaret Wilson	11 August 2009	1.909
30	8	"What's in a Name?"	Julie Rafter	Pino Amenta	Margaret Wilson	18 August 2009	1.894
31	9	"Naked Visions"	Ben Rafter	Ian Watson	Marieke Hardy	25 August 2009	1.931
32	10	"Ready to Catch You"	Dave Rafter	Ian Watson	Jeff Truman	1 September 2009	1.943
33	11	"Power Play"	Rachel Rafter	Kevin Carlin	Chris McCourt	8 September 2009	1.912
34	12	"Out of Left Field"	Ben Rafter	Kevin Carlin	Abe Pogas	15 September 2009	1.806
35	13	"Blurring the Lines"	Nathan Rafter	Cherie Nowlan	Kris Mrksa	22 September 2009	1.766
36	14	"First Instinct"	Julie Rafter	Cherie Nowlan	Marieke Hardy	29 September 2009	1.697
37	15	"It's My Party"	Dave Rafter	Lynn Hegarty	Margaret Wilson	6 October 2009	1.755
38	16	"Mr Fix-It"	Ted Taylor	Lynn Hegarty	Tony Morphett	13 October 2009	1.841
39	17	"Putting the House in Order"	Julie Rafter	Catherine Millar	Dave Warner	20 October 2009	1.701
40	18	"Space Junk"	Rachel Rafter	Catherine Millar	Abe Pogos	27 October 2009	1.958
41	19	"A Small, Traditional Affair"	Ben Rafter	Nicholas Bufalo	Marieke Hardy	3 November 2009	2.072
42	20	"Only a Heartbeat Away"	Dave Rafter	Nicholas Bufalo	Jeff Truman	10 November 2009	1.853
43	21	"Unlimited Options"	Nathan Rafter	Pino Amenta	Chris Hawkshaw	17 November 2009	1.804
44	22	"Nativity Play"	Julie Rafter	Pino Amenta	Margaret Wilson	24 November 2009	2.048

=== Season 3 (2010) ===
No. overall	No. in season	Title	Narrator	Directed by	Written by	Original release date	Australian viewers (millions)
45	1	"The Blank Page"	Julie Rafter	Pino Amenta	Jeff Truman	29 June 2010	1.917
46	2	"Saturday Night, Sunday Morning"	Julie Rafter	Pino Amenta	Marieke Hardy	29 June 2010	1.917
47	3	"To Tell or Not to Tell"	Dave Rafter	Chris Martin-Jones	Abe Pogos	6 July 2010	1.802
48	4	"A Good Husband"	Ben Rafter	Chris Martin-Jones	Margaret Wilson	13 July 2010	1.899
49	5	"The Invisible Man"	Ted Taylor	Ian Watson	Tony Morphett	20 July 2010	1.914
50	6	"Home Coming"	Rachel Rafter	Ian Watson	Christine McCourt	27 July 2010	1.910
51	7	"Simple Needs"	Julie Rafter	Lynn Hegarty	Rick Held	3 August 2010	2.017
52	8	"Rites of Passage"	Nathan Rafter	Lynn Hegarty	Jenny Lewis	10 August 2010	2.001
53	9	"The Price of Parenthood"	Dave Rafter	Cherie Nowlan	Trent Roberts	17 August 2010	1.904
54	10	"Out of the Comfort Zone"	Ben Rafter	Cherie Nowlan	Marieke Hardy	24 August 2010	1.917
55	11	"Lessons in Happiness"	Rachel Rafter	Chris Martin-Jones	Boaz Stark	31 August 2010	1.847
56	12	"Moment of Truth"	Nathan Rafter	Chris Martin-Jones	Jeff Truman	7 September 2010	1.739
57	13	"Live and Let Live"	Julie Rafter	Pino Amenta	Margaret Wilson	14 September 2010	1.867
58	14	"Know Yourself"	Dave Rafter	Pino Amenta	Tony Morphett	21 September 2010	1.873
59	15	"Don't Go There!"	Ben Rafter	Catherine Millar	Nick Stevens	28 September 2010	1.685
60	16	"When Worlds Collide"	Rachel Rafter	Catherine Millar	Chris Hawkshaw	5 October 2010	1.671
61	17	"Spark of Life"	Ted Taylor	Lynn Hegarty	Chris McCourt	12 October 2010	1.765
62	18	"Between the Covers"	Nathan Rafter	Lynn Hegarty	Martin McKenna	19 October 2010	1.795
63	19	"Breathe"	Rachel Rafter	Chris Martin-Jones	Rick Held	26 October 2010	1.686
64	20	"Perfect Bubble"	Ben Rafter	Chris Martin-Jones	Boaz Stark	2 November 2010	2.335
65	21	"Rest in Peace"	Julie Rafter	Pino Amenta	Margaret Wilson	9 November 2010	2.093
66	22	"One Day at a Time"	Dave Rafter	Pino Amenta	Jeff Truman	16 November 2010	2.080

=== Season 4 (2011–12) ===
No. overall	No. in season	Title	Narrator	Directed by	Written by	Original release date	Australian viewers (millions)
67	1	"What Lies Beneath"	Ben Rafter	Pino Amenta	Jeff Truman	8 February 2011	1.943
68	2	"In with the New"	Dave Rafter	Pino Amenta	Boaz Stark	15 February 2011	1.815
69	3	"Careful What You Wish For"	Rachel Rafter	Shirley Barrett	Marieke Hardy	22 February 2011	1.796
70	4	"Other People's Eyes"	Julie Rafter	Shirley Barrett	Anthony Ellis	1 March 2011	1.748
71	5	"The Taste of Freedom"	Nathan Rafter	Lynn-Maree Danzey	Martin McKenna	8 March 2011	1.806
72	6	"The Dollshouse"	Julie Rafter	Lynn-Maree Danzey	Jenny Lewis	15 March 2011	1.709
73	7	"Sweet Sorrow"	Rachel Rafter	Lynn Hegarty	Margaret Wilson	23 August 2011	2.011
74	8	"The Male Communication Handbook"	Dave Rafter	Ian Gilmour	Jeff Truman	30 August 2011	1.798
75	9	"From Little Things"	Ben Rafter	Ian Gilmour	Chris McCourt	6 September 2011	1.812
76	10	"Big Kids"	Nathan Rafter	Lynn Hegarty	Boaz Stark	13 September 2011	1.730
77	11	"Swimming in the Gene Pool"	Jake Barton	Nicholas Bufalo	Trent Roberts	20 September 2011	1.830
Part 2
78	12	"You've Got to Have Friends"	Julie Rafter	Nicholas Bufalo	David Lawrence	4 October 2011	1.750
79	13	"Tipping Point"	Dave Rafter	Steve Jodrell	Marieke Hardy	11 October 2011	1.733
80	14	"Trust Issues"	Ben Rafter	Steve Jodrell	Margaret Wilson	18 October 2011	1.785
81	15	"Risky Business"	Nathan Rafter	Roger Hodgman	Jenny Lewis	25 October 2011	1.753
82	16	"Second Chance"	Jake Barton	Roger Hodgman	Chris Hawkshaw	14 February 2012	1.693
83	17	"Small World"	Julie Rafter	Kevin Carlin	Martin McKenna	14 February 2012	1.520
84	18	"Sign of the Times"	Dave Rafter	Kevin Carlin	Abe Pogos	21 February 2012	1.664
85	19	"Leap of Faith"	Ted Taylor	Chris Martin-Jones	Jeff Truman	28 February 2012	1.701
86	20	"Butterfly's Wings"	Julie Rafter	Chris Martin-Jones	Chris McCourt	6 March 2012	1.723
87	21	"Sleepwalking"	Ben Rafter	Pino Amenta	Boaz Stark	13 March 2012	1.906
88	22	"Endings and Beginnings"	Julie Rafter	Pino Amenta	Margaret Wilson	20 March 2012	1.700

=== Season 5 (2012–13) ===
No. overall	No. in season	Title	Narrator	Directed by	Written by	Original release date	Australian viewers (millions)
89	1	"Answering the Call"	Julie Rafter	Kevin Carlin	Jeff Truman	17 April 2012	1.384
90	2	"Great Expectations"	Dave Rafter	Kevin Carlin	Boaz Stark	24 April 2012	1.418
91	3	"The Power of Words"	Ben Rafter	Lynn-Maree Danzey	Margaret Wilson	1 May 2012	1.355
92	4	"The Things We Do for Love"	Coby Jennings	Lynn-Maree Danzey	Marieke Hardy	8 May 2012	1.405
93	5	"Judgment Day"	Jake Barton	Lynn Hegarty	Trent Roberts	15 May 2012	1.422
94	6	"Secret Fears"	Dave Rafter	Lynn Hegarty	Chris McCourt	22 May 2012	1.459
95	7	"The Great Escape"	Ben Rafter	Pino Amenta	Martin McKenna	29 May 2012	1.534
96	8	"Unwritten Rules"	Julie Rafter	Pino Amenta	Kim Wilson	5 June 2012	1.369
97	9	"A Kiss Is Just a Kiss"	Dave Rafter	Kevin Carlin	Kim Wilson and Jenny Lewis	12 June 2012	1.590
98	10	"Letting Go"	Ted Taylor	Kevin Carlin	Hamilton Budd	19 June 2012	1.557
99	11	"The Right Time"	Ben Rafter	Lynn-Maree Danzey	Rick Held	29 January 2013	1.613
100	12	"Life's Surprises"	Julie Rafter	Lynn-Maree Danzey	Margaret Wilson	5 February 2013	1.762
101	13	"Filling the Void"	Julie Rafter	Ian Watson	Marieke Hardy	12 February 2013	1.533
102	14	"Bad Habits"	Julie Rafter	Ian Watson	Alison Boleyn	12 February 2013	1.533
103	15	"Moments of Clarity"	Ted Taylor	Roger Hodgman	David Lawrance	19 February 2013	1.559
104	16	"Displacement"	Dave Rafter	Roger Hodgman	Abe Pogos	26 February 2013	1.609
105	17	"Keeping Step"	Julie Rafter	Jet Wilkinson	Martin McKenna	5 March 2013	1.582
106	18	"That Heady Rush"	Frankie Calasso	Jet Wilkinson	Greg Millin	12 March 2013	1.568
107	19	"Got What It Takes"	Dave Rafter	Lynn-Maree Danzey	Chris McCourt	19 March 2013	1.562
108	20	"Weathering the Storm"	Jake Barton	Lynn-Maree Danzey	Drew Proffitt	26 March 2013	1.411
109	21	"Free to Choose"	Dave Rafter	Pino Amenta	Boaz Stark	9 April 2013	1.372
110	22	"Rewriting History"	Julie Rafter	Pino Amenta	Margaret Wilson	16 April 2013	1.619

=== Season 6 (2013) ===
No. overall	No. in season	Title	Narrator	Directed by	Written by	Original release date	Australian viewers (millions)
111	1	"High Hopes"	Julie Rafter	Pino Amenta	Jeff Truman	23 April 2013	1.527
112	2	"First Time for Everything"	Nathan Rafter	Pino Amenta	Marieke Hardy	30 April 2013	1.319
113	3	"Setting Limits"	Dave Rafter	Marcus Cole	Boaz Stark	7 May 2013	1.301
114	4	"Secret Women's Business"	Julie Rafter	Marcus Cole	Kim Wilson	14 May 2013	1.297
115	5	"Reality Checks"	Nathan Rafter	Samantha Lang	Abe Pogos	21 May 2013	1.438
116	6	"Manning Up"	Ted Taylor	Samantha Lang	Alison Boleyn	28 May 2013	1.224
117	7	"Taking Stock"	Carbo Karadonis	Jean-Pierre Mignon	Martin McKenna	4 June 2013	1.344
118	8	"Damage Control"	Dave Rafter	Jean-Pierre Mignon	David Lawrance	11 June 2013	1.326
119	9	"Role Reversals"	Julie Rafter	Lynn Hegarty	Hamilton Budd and Kim Wilson	18 June 2013	1.250
120	10	"Head vs Heart"	Dave Rafter	Lynn Hegarty	Rick Held	25 June 2013	1.377
121	11	"Centre of the Universe"	Julie Rafter	Lynn-Maree Danzey	Marieke Hardy	2 July 2013	1.584
122	12	"Packing Up the Rafters"	Julie Rafter	Lynn-Maree Danzey	Margaret Wilson	2 July 2013	1.585

== Ratings ==
Packed to the Rafters : AUS viewers per episode (millions)

Season	Episode number																					
Season	1	2	3	4	5	6	7	8	9	10	11	12	13	14	15	16	17	18	19	20	21	22
1	1.945	2.045	1.960	1.895	1.945	1.836	1.979	1.886	1.868	1.926	2.067	1.959	2.013	1.824	1.874	1.688	1.740	1.833	1.876	1.817	1.887	2.033
2	2.185	1.851	1.794	1.857	1.926	1.880	1.909	1.894	1.931	1.943	1.912	1.806	1.766	1.697	1.755	1.841	1.701	1.958	2.072	1.853	1.804	2.048
3	1.917	1.917	1.802	1.899	1.914	1.910	2.017	2.001	1.904	1.917	1.847	1.739	1.867	1.873	1.685	1.671	1.765	1.795	1.686	2.335	2.093	2.080
4	1.943	1.815	1.796	1.748	1.806	1.709	2.011	1.798	1.812	1.730	1.830	1.750	1.733	1.785	1.753	1.693	1.520	1.664	1.701	1.723	1.906	1.700
5	1.384	1.418	1.355	1.405	1.422	1.459	1.534	1.369	1.590	1.557	1.613	1.762	1.533	1.533	1.559	1.609	1.582	1.568	1.562	1.411	1.372	1.619
6	1.527	1.319	1.301	1.297	1.438	1.224	1.344	1.326	1.250	1.377	1.584	1.585	–									

Source: Audience measurement performed by OzTam
