= List of Thunderstone episodes =

This is a list of episodes of the Australian science fiction television series, Thunderstone.

Throughout its run, there have been 3 seasons spanning 52 episodes.

== Series overview ==
Season	Episodes	First aired	Last aired
1	26	February 12, 1999	August 6, 1999
2	13	August 13, 1999	November 5, 1999
3	13	June 16, 2000	September 8, 2000

== Season 1 (1999) ==
No. overall	No. in season	Title	Directed by	Written by	Original release date
1	1	"The Comet Nemesis"	Colin Budds	Michael Joshua	February 12, 1999
Noah's obsession with the holodeck lands him in trouble again when he overstays his allotted time in the VR program. Dr. Pretorius, his teacher and a member of the North Col Triumvirate, must impose the penalty of punishment duty topside in the Impact Winter blizzards. He must also remind Noah of the necessity of order in North Col and his responsibility within the small community that survives in this underground research centre following the impact of the Nemesis supercomet with the Earth. But whilst his mother and father, Liz and Simon, and his sister Becky sleep, Noah's inquiring scientific drive and his fascination with the now extinct animals, forces him back to the holodeck. A power glitch from his PH-Ts fuses with two on-duty holocops, resulting in a bright white light that engulfs him and he is gone, arriving in what he believes is a holodeck programme. But the sun is too hot and the holograms are real. They are the Nomads and this is Haven.
2	2	"Tao's Secret Weapon"	Colin Budds	Annie Fox	February 19, 1999
The Nomads, led by Arushka and with Noah as their prisoner, narrowly escape capture by the marauding Protectors, who are gathering workers for the Thunderstone mine. In the safety of their cavern, the Nomads question Noah. All he wants is to return to the future and his home in North Col, where his family and Dr. Pretorius are bewildered and concerned by his disappearance. Where is he? Is he dead? As Jett, Sutch and the Protectors follow their leader Tao's orders, and close in behind the wheels of their menacing vehicles, the Nomads take Noah with them into the night. The chase intensifies until Noah, using his mini PC, foils Tao's new weapon, the Sentinel. As the Nomads sleep, Noah emerges into the dawn of a new day. Surveying Haven's beauty as he tries to activate the PH-Ts, Noah is tackled. A prisoner again, but whose?
3	3	"Twin Brothers"	Colin Budds	David Phillips	February 26, 1999
Noah is being marched across the alien landscape of the Red Desert, his unimpressed captor, Sundance, tossing the PH-Ts away. Suddenly they have company, Sundance's twin brother and Protector – Sutch! In the Keep at the Thunderstone mine Tao watches the confrontation on his screen, as Jett arrives and takes Sundance prisoner using her net gun. Noah makes a run for it and arrives at the Sentinel Camp where he discovers a humiliated Sundance. Noah cannot leave him – their dramatic escape and destruction of the Sentinel has added further fuel to Tao's anger. Meanwhile, the Nomads travelling the Deep Road are hoping to reach safety. Noah and Sundance join them but Noah discovers his PH-Ts are gone! He will never get them back, he will be trapped here in this hostile place. Looking around him in the tunnel, he sees something familiar – he realises this is the ruin of North Col. He has been wrong – he is not in the past but in the future! What happened to everyone, to his family?
4	4	"Escape from the Hollow Mountain"	Colin Budds	David Phillips	March 5, 1999
The Nomads are making their way apprehensively along the Deep Road. Arushka shows Noah the mural of the Wild Things, a hand painted depiction of a Noah's Ark of animals, wondrous creatures that no longer exist. Their fear of the Deep Road is validated when Noah's mini PC is found smashed and the mural vandalised. Something or someone is there! Tao speeds across the Red Desert to where Jett and Savage have discovered a magnificent prize – a perfectly preserved big rig truck, The Beast. This find is what Tao has been waiting for, now he will be able to move ahead with his greater plan. Noah and the Nomads emerge into the Red Desert as the fired up Beast, blasted out of Hollow Mountain, bears down on them. Sundance bravely draws it away and they all watch in horror as the Beast gets to him before he can escape. The Beast turns around to pursue the Nomads, but they have disappeared, seemingly into thin air. Has Sundance been captured? Noah has his PH-Ts, but what good are they without a power source? He could be stuck here forever!
5	5	"Trapped"	Colin Budds	Annie Fox	March 12, 1999
As Arushka and Chip arrive at the Thunderstone mine to rescue Sundance from the Protectors, Noah joins them. This could be his ticket home, a chance to access power. Tao, whose plans are constantly thwarted by the Nomads, wants them caught! He has the Beast and will be the master of the desert. Leaving Chip on guard, Noah and Arushka get into the Mine. Covering themselves in Thunderstone powder they make their way into the tunnel. Arushka creates the diversion that Noah needs and then escapes to return to Chip who has been joined by a very alive Sundance. Arushka decides that she cannot just abandon Noah and she returns to the Mine, walking into a trap. Now she and Noah are Tao's captives. The distraction caused by Arushka's arrival gives Noah the chance to grab his PH-Ts. He powers them up and the two of them white-out. They have arrived somewhere. A trumpeting sound greets them and they turn to find themselves face to face with their first real animal – an elephant!
6	6	"The Lion"	Colin Budds	Everett DeRoche	March 19, 1999
Noah and Arushka stare gobsmacked at the huge creature before them. This is a circus in 1999 – they have gone back too far! Arushka doesn't hear or care about Noah's concerns – these are real animals, not just images on a wall. She never wants to leave. Noah tells her in a couple of years the animals and everything else will be gone when the Nemesis Comet strikes. Noah sets off to find a power source, leaving a saddened Arushka to look around. All of the animals are amazing but when she meets the beautiful circus horse Moshi she is totally captivated. As Noah drags Arushka away from the circus, they meet Sophie and Mingus, a pair of animal liberationists set on freeing the circus animals. Whilst trying to prevent the animals from escaping, Noah and Arushka are caught and accused of the break-ins. In North Col, a quantum aberration convinces Becky that Noah may have time-travelled. Tao roars across the Red Desert in the Beast, telling Jett about his latest weapon: the mobile Sentinel tracking device. They can run but they cannot hide! Noah and Arushka are being escorted to a waiting police car when a lion escapes its cage. The crowd panics but an entranced Arushka is captivated by the beauty of the King of the Jungle.
7	7	"Moshi the Horse"	Colin Budds	Everett DeRoche	March 26, 1999
With the escaped lion on the bonnet of the police car, a horrified and amazed crowd watches as Arushka calms him. She achieves instant star status when she gestures the animal back into his cage. Ivana arrives with Moshi and speaks quickly with Arushka. She understands the future Arushka comes from and asks Arushka to take Moshi with her. Using power from a nearby news van, Noah activates the PH-Ts and in a flash of white light Arushka, Noah and the beautiful black horse Moshi are gone! Instantly they reappear in Haven and the first animal brought through time has arrived! Becky, experimenting with her own PH-Ts hoping to discover what happened to her brother, shrieks with delight as she witnesses their time journey. He's alive! Pretorius quizzes Becky about what she saw but he and Becky's parents give little credit to her story. Becky wants to try to recreate the conditions at the time of Noah's disappearance but is not allowed. Lost without Arushka's leadership, the Nomads, spotted by Tao's mobile Sentinel, are captured as they flee to safety. Noah, Arushka and Moshi launch into a rescue mission. Noah hijacks the Beast while Arushka liberates her friends. The Protectors are closing in on Noah when Arushka and Moshi gallop into the fray and scoop Noah from the Beast and on to freedom! Arushka believes that Moshi must not be the only animal in the future of the world. She tells Noah if he helps her she will help him get to a power source to effect his escape home. What choice does he have?
8	8	"The Secret Entrance"	Mark DeFriest	Barbara Bishop	April 2, 1999
Tao has a plan to capture the Nomads – with the help of his Sentinel he will trap them in their own lair! In the Beast he watches on the screen as Arushka and Chip release Moshi and Noah and Geneva head towards the Mine. He and Jett race across the Red Desert chasing the signal, closing in. Noah and Geneva manage to hide just in time, thwarting Tao. But inside the Beast Sutch continues to record the Sentinel's readings, logging the caverns entrances. Tao outlines his plan to Sutch and orders more Protectors and supplies of Thunderstone. He will get them this time! Having secreted himself in a Protector vehicle returning to the Beast, Noah is shocked as a hand grabs him. It's Sundance. But now they are both trapped as protector guards surround them!
9	9	"Sabotage"	Mark DeFriest	Jenny Sharp	April 9, 1999
Still trapped under the Beast trailer, Noah and Sundance see Arushka approaching on Moshi. Tao, impressed with her bravery, and interested in Moshi, steps out to confront her, giving Noah and Sundance the chance to get inside the Beast trailer and sabotage the map coordinates that would lead to the capture of the Nomads. With the mission accomplished Noah and Sundance say their farewells, Noah heading off to the Keep and a power source for his PH-Ts. Tao dispatches the Protectors, offering a reward to whoever captures Noah. The glittering prize of a vehicle all the incentive they need. Alone, Tao tries to contact the Shadowmaster but with no answer. He storms out. With the Nomads safe again for the moment, Arushka heads to the Mine where Noah has been captured by Jett. Quick thinking gets Noah and Arushka into the Beast trailer. Accessing the power source, Noah grabs Arushka's hand and they white-out as a volatile Tao rips the door open. Where are they now?
10	10	"Aliens on the Farm"	Mark DeFriest	Alison Nisselle	April 16, 1999
Noah and Arushka white-in, arriving in some bush country abundant with wildlife, and to Arushka's delight, horses. Her reverie is shattered as gunshots ring through the air. An outraged Arushka runs to the noise and confronts Bully and Mac who are trying to cull kangaroos. Not happy at being interrupted they warn Noah and Arushka off. They are saved from these lads only to be imprisoned by their saviour, Duane, an alien fanatic who saw them arrive. This time they will have to believe him, he has proof! In Haven, the Shadowmaster has contacted Tao, demanding that he make the capture of Noah his first priority. Travelling to the Deep Road, Tao forces Ferris, a young timid boy, into spying on the Nomads. He wants to know where they hide. Free again, Arushka and Noah prepare to leave. But things go terribly wrong and Noah arrives back in Haven in the company of dozens of animals, birds and the sheepdog Dolly, but without Arushka. Arushka is alone and trapped in the past!
11	11	"Friends in the Past"	Mark DeFriest	Alison Nisselle	April 23, 1999
Arushka, still trapped in the past and hunted by Bully, Mac and Duane, saves Mac from being trampled by a wild brumby. Awed by the mystical effect she has on the animal, they listen to her story. Duane and Mac agree to help her but Bully standing alone is not to be trusted. Tao has dispatched his Protectors to Noah's arrival coordinates. As they close in on Noah, Dolly sends them scattering, terrified as they have never seen a monster like this dog. Noah must get to a power source and go back and save Arushka, who is with Duane and Mac rounding up horses when Noah whites-in. In a race against time, Bully having called the police, Noah powers up his PH-Ts and he and Arushka, now astride one of the horses, white-out. Tao is preparing to demonstrate his dominance over the animals that have his troops cowering when Noah, Arushka and the horses arrive in a whirlwind of light and dust and power. The Protectors again run scared from these strange beasts. More animals have arrived in Haven!
12	12	"Escape from the Protectors"	Mark DeFriest	Peter Kinloch	April 30, 1999
Arushka now has the horses she wanted but Noah tells her he can't help her bring back more animals to Haven – he wants to go home. Bidding them farewell he heads off towards the Mine. On the way a brave and loyal Dolly saves him again and his journey must be abandoned. The Shadowmaster exerts his power. Tao must mine more Thunderstone! He orders Tao to leave Noah to him, he has a plan! The Nomads have made their way back to the Cavern, but unknown to them, lurking in the darkness, following and watching their every move is Ferris. The Triumvirate summon Noah's family and Dr. Pretorius to appear before them. The charge is one of unauthorised scientific experimentation. North Col's strict laws must be obeyed if they wish to remain part of the community. As the sun rises on a new day Noah wakes from a dream of a world full of animals. He forges a pact with Arushka – together they will save animals from past and bring them to the future, to Haven.
13	13	"The Electronet"	Mark DeFriest	Peter Kinloch	May 7, 1999
In the middle of the red desert a furious Tao stands before a burning effigy of himself. Unguarded, the Beast's trailer looms behind. Noah and Arushka enter it and begin the first of many risky sorties to access the power they will need to bring back the wondrous collection of animals that will fill the magnificent landscape that is Haven. When the mission is accomplished, it is time for Noah to leave but Tao's tightened security will make this the most dangerous attempt of all for Noah. Ferris, fleeing from an unexpected meeting with Dolly and her newborn puppies, is captured by an equally nervous Savage and Rork. They gather up the puppies and head to the Keep with Ferris where Tao is demonstrating the Electronets, his latest weapon in his war against the Nomads and now the animals as well. Using this distraction to his advantage, Noah sneaks into the mine but is himself a victim of the Electronet. Tao has finally captured Noah, who still a little stunned yet still refuses to talk. But Tao has Dolly's puppies, and unless Noah co-operates, he will harm them with the Electronet!
14	14	"Tao's Force"	Mark DeFriest	Helen McWhirter	May 14, 1999
Noah has been forced to give in to Tao, who would have used the destructive Electronet on Dolly's puppies. Now a prisoner in the Keep, Noah discovers Ferris and retrieves his PH-Ts which Ferris has stolen. Noah escapes with Ferris' help only to find Arushka has been captured while trying to rescue the puppies. Noah tries to smash the Net which Tao is trying to lure Dolly into but he is zapped and thrown to the ground, unconscious. The captive miners are galvanised into action and while the battle rages Sundance and Chip get Noah out, but Ferris is caught – and this time he'd better tell Tao where the Nomads hide! Tao's army, spearheaded by the Beast, races towards the Nomads' cavern. Noah and the Nomads are trapped – Jett's Thunder-oil smoke machine will flush them from their network of tunnels. This time there is no escape!
15	15	"The Weapon"	Mark DeFriest	Helen McWhirter	May 21, 1999
Noah and the Nomads are forced from safety by the Thunderstone smoke that continues to billow out of the Cavern; they are surrounded by Protectors and trapped by the Electronets. If captured they will be unable to stop Tao so Noah, their only hope, must travel back to his time and return with technology to fight the Electronets. Harnessing the power of the Electronets, he takes Geneva's hand and they white-out, arriving in the raging blizzards of Topside North Col where they succumb to the freezing conditions. Tao surprises the Nomads by releasing them, explaining that with Noah gone they are no longer a threat. He has called a truce – but why? Found by Dr. Pretorius and nursed back to health, Noah and Geneva are called before the Triumvirate for a preliminary hearing. There are a lot of questions that require answers and as there is no evidence to prove time-travel – the matter will need to be investigated in depth. Noah placed under house arrest and a frightened and confused Geneva is detained in the Discipline Centre.
16	16	"Meeting with the Shadow Master"	Mark DeFriest	Victoria Osborne	May 28, 1999
Sundance, jumped by Sutch in the Deep Road as he searches for Ferris, is thrown down the Devil's run. As he fights the rapids to stay alive, the Nomads search unsuccessfully for him. Ferris, now accepted as one of them, delivers a distressing message from the Shadowmaster that Noah and Geneva will not be returning to Haven so there will be no equipment. Their battle has been lost before it even began! Who is the Shadowmaster and how did he know Noah was back in North Col? A disempowered Dr. Pretorius manages to have Geneva released into Noah's custody and convinces the other members of the Triumvirate that a demonstration of time-travel will settle the matter. Geneva prepares for her journey home but something goes wrong and she and Noah fail to white-out. The Triumvirate accuse him of lying and place him in detention along with Geneva. Sundance is rescued by the peace-loving Sandtribers, who take him over the Mountains of the Mist and to his first breathtaking vision of the ocean. Meanwhile, the Shadowmaster is ordering Tao to speed up his efforts in locating the Thunderstone Motherlode, he must find it – it is the future of Haven!
17	17	"Lies and Secrets"	Mark DeFriest	Annie Fox	June 4, 1999
Noah and Geneva stand trial before the Triumvirate and are found guilty. For Noah this could mean five years without any privileges and for Geneva, exile Topside where she must try and survive the Impact Winter. The Triumvirate sentences them to work detail until they reach their conclusions. Arushka finds a groggy Sundance who was returning home from the Sandtribers when Sutch zapped him with an Electronet. She is outraged – there was a truce! Realising that he has been found out, a furious Tao seeks out Ferris and forces him to lie to the Nomads and tell them it was a mistake by a disobedient Protector. Furious about the outcome of her brother's trial, Becky breaks Noah and Geneva out of the Discipline Centre and takes them to Dr. Pretorius who gives Noah a pair of PH-Ts. He can take Geneva home at last.
18	18	"The Silver Wings"	Mark DeFriest	Marieke Hardy	June 11, 1999
Dr. Pretorius leads Geneva and Noah through a Topside blizzard to his secret research lab. Armed with the PH-Ts and Dr. Pretorius' new Silverwing device, which will defeat Tao's Electronets, Noah is ready to take Geneva back to Haven. Arriving, they stare in awe at their surroundings, it is the ocean and it is truly magnificent. Turning at the sound of a familiar voice they are stunned to discover that Becky has somehow managed to accidentally travel with them. After a rest, good food, and the company of the Sandtribers, the trio commence their journey home. Coming across an Electronet, Noah makes a discovery that will have serious consequences: Tao has activated the nets but the Silverwing weapon is faulty and ineffective against them. Arushka calls a meeting to determine Ferris's fate within the Nomads. It is decided he can join them if he can convince Tao that they do not believe he is installing any more Electronets and is abiding by their truce. Tao doesn't believe Ferris for one moment. With Becky's help, repairs are made to the Silverwing and its test comes when the Nomads discover Tao has targeted the horses as his first victims. Noah and the Nomads can only hope that the Silverwing will work. Noah throws it, it flies through the air, passing through the nets and returns to land at his feet. The horse escape unharmed through the Electronets. It has worked! They are triumphant!
19	19	"Tao's New Weapon"	Mark DeFriest	Barbara Bishop	June 18, 1999
Tao sits in the Beast with his anger rising watching as one by one all of the Electronets are destroyed. The Silverwing has saved the animals. Noah, his sister Becky and the Nomads have won the battle but not the war. The Shadowmaster arrives, interested only in results. Tao convinces him that using the maserguns he can get rid of the Nomads then nothing will stop them finding the Thunderstone motherlode. In the cavern as the Nomads sleep, Chip sneaks out. It doesn't matter what Arushka says, he must go and help Sundance at the Mine. He teams up with him just as Tao is demonstrating the maserguns and panicking, tries to make a run for it before Sundance can stop him. Meanwhile Noah, Becky and the Nomads begin their trek to the ocean, unaware that Chip has been captured by Tao. With Chip his prisoner, Tao instructs Sundance that unless the others surrender, Chip will be history. In a race against time, Moshi carries Arushka and Noah back across Haven. They will have to give Tao what he wants. Themselves!
20	20	"The Serum"	Mark DeFriest	David Phillips	June 25, 1999
With Noah and Arushka safely imprisoned in the Beast, Tao roars off leaving Chip alone under the relentless sun of the Red Desert. On a rescue mission, Sundance and Becky find him, exhausted and thirsty but alive. A smug Tao, with Noah his captive audience, tempts him with knowledge of his future; Noah is only 65 years in the future and he along with the survivors from North Col could still be alive somewhere. Tao produces a disk that he claims was found in the ruins of the old holodeck and contains a history of North Col. Noah agrees to watch it but only if Arushka is with him. The end of North Col unfolds – his family's suffering because of his illegal time-travel, the horrors of the rat carried disease rabies sweeping through the panicked citizens. Is he responsible? Noah believes he is the only one who can save his people – he must return. "But if I am the only survivor", asks Noah, "what happened to me?" Tao has one more piece of information. "You reappear", he says, "as the Shadowmaster!"
21	21	"Rats in North Col"	Colin Budds	Jenny Sharp	July 2, 1999
Tao offers Noah a share of the rabies vaccine and power to return to him to North Col. With Noah gone and the maserguns to rid Haven of the animals, Tao is now free to find more Thunderstone. Noah and Becky return to North Col, but where is everyone? What is happening? Was Tao right? They find Dr. Pretorius who confirms Noah's fears, rats have been sighted in North Col. Producing the vials of vaccine given to him by Tao, Noah tells Dr. Pretorius everything. Until the vaccine can be tested Dr. Pretorius advises them they must hide, there's nothing he could do if the Triumvirate found them. In Haven, Tao has the breakthrough he needs, a lead to a strong concentration of Thunderstone in the mountains. But the Sandtriber presence there must be eliminated. Marshalling his Protector forces, they move out in convoy. Nothing can stop him now!
22	22	"The Tribunal"	Colin Budds	Everett DeRoche	July 9, 1999
The thought that he could be the monstrous Shadowmaster tortures Noah as he waits anxiously for the results of his father's tests on vaccine. When Becky produces the disk she took from Tao detailing apocalyptic future events, Noah calls for an Open Forum in which the citizens of North Col can decide on this evidence for themselves. If he can convince them to listen, he may be able to save them. Tao feels they are near the source of the Thunderstone – the motherlode! He will not be hindered by anyone or anything. As he prepares to fire on some horses, the Silverwing swoops through the air, disarms his masergun and returns to Sundance. The beautiful animals are safe. An enraged Tao orders his troops to move in. Faced with the Protectors' new weapons, the Nomads are surrounded. Noah has failed and he and his family are placed under house arrest. With Becky's help he eludes the holocops escaping to Dr. Pretorius retreat only to be confronted by the Shadowmaster. This time the nightmare is real.
23	23	"Future Visions"	Colin Budds	Peter Kinloch	July 16, 1999
Noah cannot believe that he is, or that in the future he will become, the creature that stands before him. The Shadowmaster tells Noah that it is time he learnt the truth. They both white-out of North Col and arrive in Haven. The Shadowmaster challenges Noah – was it right to bring the animals to Haven? They outnumber the humans and will continue to breed. Good, says Noah defending their rights and place in the laws of nature. The Shadowmaster lauds the wonders of Thunderstone. Its power will bring the human race back to his former greatness! It cannot be wasted on animals. "If I am to become what you are", says Noah, "why can't I change the future and so change myself? What is happening to me? To the Nomads?" But the Shadowmaster sends him back to North Col, back to rats scurrying everywhere, panicking citizens who don't see, as does Noah and his family, that the rats are in fact an illusion – they are holograms. Into this pandemonium the Shadowmaster appears and laughing mirthlessly, removes his mask revealing himself… it is Dr. Pretorius, he is the Shadowmaster!
24	24	"The Hearing"	Colin Budds	Helen McWhirter	July 23, 1999
The Daniels family are blamed for the rabies virus and the North Col community will not listen as Noah tells them the rats weren't real but holograms. Matters worsen when it is discovered the vaccine held as evidence has been stolen. Simon's subsequent collapse causes everyone to panic. He has a virus! Liz finds that the disk given to Noah by Tao is nothing but a series of sophisticated computer generation images. Who is responsible for this dangerous hoax? Noah returns to Haven to collect more vaccine to save his father. But the Mine has been abandoned. Tao has moved everyone to the Mountains of the Moon in search of the Motherlode. Noah makes his way across the Red Desert. He must save his friends and get the vaccine before it is too late! Inadvertently a Kestrel gives Tao the answer he has been searching for. Now the Shadowmaster and Tao stand, transfixed – before them is the secret of life, youth, and absolute power. It is the core of the Nemesis Comet, the pure Thunderstone Motherlode!
25	25	"The Evacuation"	Colin Budds	Barbara Bishop	July 30, 1999
While the unsuspecting citizens of North Col are preparing for their journey to Haven, the Shadowmaster is assuring Tao that a labour force will arrive soon to help in the mining of the Thunderstone. Becky's suspicions are aroused when she sees Dr. Pretorius behaving strangely. As she explores a deserted North Col she discovers that Dr. Pretorius has the missing vaccine in his secret lab. Captured by the Shadowmaster she is forced to join the others in Haven. Noah unmasks the Shadowmaster revealing him to be Dr. Pretorius. Noah is not the evil Shadowmaster. Forced by Dr. Pretorius to listen to his great vision of a new Haven, they arrive at Tao's base camp just as the recaptured Nomads are herded in. An argument erupts between Tao and Pretorius and to prove his authority Dr. Pretorius exiles the Nomads through time into the snowy blizzard of North Col.
26	26	"Finally Free Again"	Colin Budds	Barbara Bishop	August 6, 1999
In a Topside blizzard the bewildered Nomads make their way into North Col where Geneva guides them to the holodeck. Through a combination of deduction and good luck the Nomads propel themselves forward in time to Haven where their reappearance is monitored by Sutch. Sutch, who is under instructions from Dr. Pretorius to take Noah and Becky to a place they can never return from, instead reunites them with the Nomads. He too will now join them in their battle to defeat the Protectors and Dr. Pretorius. Together they formulate a plan to destroy the Thunderstone. Noah and the Nomads move on the unprotected Thunderstone motherlode. As Sutch and Sundance hijack the Beast and liberate the enslaved work force, Noah, Becky and the other Nomads spread salt out at the motherlode base. The showdown has begun! Tao and Dr. Pretorius move to protect their Thunderstone, their future. Tao, now revealed to be a hologram himself has targeted Noah but Becky's quick thinking saves him. Tao flickers wildly and disappears! Dr. Pretorius, his life's work destroyed pleads with Noah who, raising a Masergun, ignites the salt and with it the motherlode. The war over, Noah throws down the Masergun. Behind him Dr. Pretorius is left engulfed by the flames. Tranquillity in Haven, the Nomads and animals are free. Noah, his family and the citizens return to North Col – there must be a past so there will be a future. As Noah hangs up the PH-Ts he smiles with the memories he will hold on to. In Haven Arushka rides proudly on Moshi. Before her the landscape is filed with the animals of the world. They will live free once more.

== Season 2 (1999) ==
No. overall	No. in season	Title	Directed by	Written by	Original release date
27	1	"The Old Peddler"	Mark DeFriest	David Phillips	August 13, 1999
In Haven of 2085, Arushka rides Moshi, her black mare, through the Riverlands. She's inspecting the contented Animals which she and Noah have transported to the future to avoid extinction. Dolly follows at a distance… But we see the faithful sheepdog distracted and lured away. Above the North Col of 2020, the Impact Winter produced by the Nemesis Comet still prevails. Noah discovers Dolly, terrified and half frozen in the blizzard. How had the dog travelled back through time and who sent her? Arushka returns to the compound, where the Nomads now live as a settled community. With their enemies vanquished and the contentious mineral Thunderstone wiped from the face of the Earth, Haven is a peaceful place. An eccentric old peddler, Monsoon, visits with gossip about the comings and goings of new settlers and about the weather, which in Haven has lately been extreme and unpredictable. Dolly is discovered in North Col by the authorities and is condemned to banishment in the snow. To save her, Noah breaks the new rules which ban time- travel. He breaks into the sealed Holodeck and used the PH-Ts to return again, with Dolly, to Haven. He arrives at the height of the storm and helps the Nomads save their hut from a lightning-felled tree. Then there's time for a reunion. But the Dolly mystery is unexplained and some unidentified figures are watching them through the trees.
28	2	"Quicksand"	Mark DeFriest	Marieke Hardy	August 20, 1999
Noah is quick to notice that there is dissent among the Nomads. Now that they're no longer on the run from a common enemy there's a restlessness. Old Monsoon visits with his wares and tall tales and wheedles an invitation to stay the night. In the morning, Noah discovers he's taken his PH-Ts and he and Arushka set off to the get the precious time travel device back. Meanwhile in North Col, Becky tries to cover for Noah's absence by producing the Noahgram, a hologrammatic version of himself which Noah has recently created. Its behaviour creates bizarre situationsand the ruse is quickly discovered. Chip, annoyed at being left behind, determined to catch Monsoon by himself. Against Kwan's warnings, he saddles up Moshi, Arushka's majestic black mare. Arushka and Noah catch up with Monsoon and demand the PH-Ts returned, but the crafty old man denies having seen them. Meanwhile, Chip is having trouble with Moshi but he hears the rattle of Monsoons pots and pans in the distance and manages to spur the horse on into the woods. All is silent and there is no sign of Monsoon, but something in the bushes frightens Moshi. She rears and Chip is thrown into a pit of quicksand. The frightened horse bolts, leaving Chip alone and helpless, sinking further into the quagmire. What could have frightened Moshi so much she'd leave a Nomad in Peril? Alerted to the danger by Moshi, bridled but riderless, Noah and Arushka race to Chip's rescue. But they're too late. As Chip disappears below the sand four strangers to Haven haul him out Myah, a barbaric looking young woman and her three brothers, Rorden, Tod and Lyal. Not only have they saved Chip's life, they also have the PH-Ts, which Rorden reluctantly relinquishes. The Nomads and the new family pledge a wary friendship. With the PH-Ts returned, Noah must face the fact that there is no source of power for them in Haven. How will he get back to North Col?
29	3	"Broken Dreams"	Mark DeFriest	Peter Kinloch	August 27, 1999
As dry electrical storms prevail in Haven there is growing concern about the changing climate. Noah devises a plan to harness the lightning, which strokes most often on Razorback Ridge, and so powers his PH-Ts. Monsoon wins back favour in the Nomads' compound by bringing in a wounded animal and half of a weathered amulet. Kwan produces the other half, given to him by his long-lost mother. With the prospect of reuniting with her, Kwan bids the Nomads farewell. Though his hopes are dashed, a heart-broken Kwan has too much pride to return to the compound. Monsoon, meanwhile is spooked by a visit to the family. It seems these people can communicate with each other telepathically. Up on Razorback Ridge, Arushka insists Noah test the PH-Ts before using them on himself. The stand-in scarecrow is burnt to cinders as lightning is channelled into the PH-Ts. Nevertheless Noah ignores all protests, reconfigures the equipment and successfully time-travels back to North Col. Noah's family are relieved to see him but the North Col authorities thrust him into the detention centre for breaking the time travel ban. Myah is lurking in the North Col sludge pipes. How and why has she accompanied Noah on his time travels?
30	4	"Is Noah Banished?"	Mark DeFriest	Roger Dunn	September 3, 1999
Myah makes herself known to Becky and Russell, a clumsy classmate whose suspicion is quickly supplanted by infatuation with the stranger. When the news is conveyed to Noah he realises he must take her back to Haven immediately. But how to escape the detention centre in order to do it? Russell reluctantly agrees to help by taking Noah's place in the cell. Bamboozling the Holocops, Becky smuggles Russell in and Noah out. Meanwhile in Haven, Lyal pays a visit to the Nomads' compound. His bullying and arrogance infuriate Sundance and he gladly accepts when Lyal challenges him to a race. Sundance is further angered when Lyal wins by cheating and with help from his brothers who secretly use their telepathic powers against him. It's memorial day in North Col. Syndia, the most officious member of the ruling Triumvirate, is giving her address. With everyone distracted Noah and Myah make it up to the holodeck. Myah shows an over zealous interest in the workings of the Holodeck as Noah successfully white-lights them out. By now Russell has been discovered. A furious Syndia strides into the detention centre and sees Noah is gone. Noah is now in deeper trouble than ever. Back in Haven, he and the Nomads view Myah and her brothers with increasing suspicion.
31	5	"Becky's Trick"	Mark DeFriest	Roger Dunn	September 10, 1999
Syndia, still fuming, pronounces banishment for Noah when he returns. In Haven, Noah is awaiting the next lightning strike. Myah pleads with him not to leave, making vague promises of power and success. She is left behind angry and frustrated, as Noah white-lights out once again. Noah arrives home secretly and employs Becky's radical plan to avoid banishment: he uses the PH-Ts to travel 24 hours back in time to the detention cell. In the re-run yesterday, Syndia storms in and finds Noah safely locked away, rather than discovering Russell. Back in today, Becky is delighted with the success of their plan, but Noah is shaken by its implications. He swears never to use time travel technology to change history again. Meanwhile in Haven, Geneva falls into an animal trap – who would make such a thing in Haven? Chip runs off to alert the others but doesn't see a herd of wild brumbies approaching. While Lyal and Rorden muster the animals towards the trap, Tod, the youngest of the family, discovers Geneva and places himself between the trap and the stampeding animals. He manages to divert them and pulls Geneva to safety. When they spot the Nomads approaching, Rorden and Lyal flee. Tod is brought back to the compound as a prisoner. As a hunter of animals he is an enemy to the Nomads. But his charms are not lost on his warden, Geneva. She is convinced Tod has learned his lesson and successfully argues for his release. At their campsite, Myah rips into her brothers for getting on the wrong side of the Nomads. They need them… but for what?
32	6	"Last Warning"	Mark DeFriest	Lois Booton	September 17, 1999
There has been no rain in Haven for a long time and Arushka is worried about the animals. While checking up on them she sees Rorden, the most eccentric of Myah's brothers, scurrying out of the rocks below Razorback Ridge. She and Sundance return to the spot to investigate. They discover Rorden's Grotto, filled with weird equipment. Meanwhile Myah is conducting a few investigations of her own. Once again she uses the Nomads goodwill to her advantage and is snooping around the Beast, an old vehicle still filled with gadgetry of its precious owners, the Protectors. The brothers return to their cave and catch the unsuspecting intruders. Arushka and Sundance have no means of escape, locked in a primitive cage. What is the strange family up to? Above North Col, Noah finds a pair of modified PH-Ts, exactly where Dolly was found. Somebody, sharing his knowledge, must have sent her into the past deliberately. Risking the inevitable censure, Noah once more travels to Haven to find the truth. The Nomads have received Arushka's message from Prince, a friendly kestrel. Noah and the gang embark on a mission to rescue Arushka and Sundance. In the struggle between the Nomads and the brothers, Sundance is recaptured. And now Rorden has got hold of the PH-Ts. At last, he says, dangling them in front of the caged Sundance, I have a human subject for my experiments.
33	7	"Disco Fever"	Julian McSwiney	Helen McWhirter	September 24, 1999
Rorden prepares to send Sundance on an experimental time trip. In a failed rescue attempt, Chip is caught up in the white light along with Sundance. The two boys arrive in a present-day dance club. Chip is fazed by his surroundings, but Sundance finds the rhythm of the music intriguing and has soon caught the eye of a pretty girl. Myah returns to find the brothers in a panic and is furious about their inept behaviour. Not only have they damaged the family's relations with the Nomads almost beyond repair, but Myah is forced to ask for Noah's help in retrieving Sundance and Chip. Noah's assistance is not cheap – Myah has to answer his questions. Myah reveals that she and her brothers come from the Silver City, a future metropolis and the pride of Haven in 2235. Noah extricates Chip and Sundance from the club, just in time to avoid the wrath of a jealous boyfriend. On Razorback Ridge, Myah and her brothers are part of a welcoming committee, but the Nomads want nothing to do with the meddlesome family.
34	8	"The Mysterious Valley"	Julian McSwiney	Helen McWhirter	October 1, 1999
Drought conditions in Haven are at a crisis point. Desperate to give the precious animals the best chance for survival, Arushka and the Nomads attempt to muster them from the vast, parched high country into the lowlands. A scrub fire breaks out and the frightened animals are scattering when Myah and the brothers appear offering help. Together with the Nomads they manage to put out the fire and herd the animals to a lowland area where there are still a few patches of pasture. Arushka and Noah warily agree to hear Myah's suggestions for a more permanent solution to the drought. She explains that in Silver City of 2235 their father was in charge of a weather control system and that they have landed here as a result of Rorden's fallible experiments with time-travel. Rorden unveils the futuristic blueprint for a rain machine and Noah is astounded to realise the building of such a thing is feasible. But with Thunderstone eradicated from Haven there would be no source of power gigantic enough to drive this machine from the future. Back in North Col, Becky discovers a storeroom filling with steam. She is struggling with valves and overrides switches when Liz, her mother, comes to the rescue. Something is wrong with the exhaust line, which Liz believes could indicate serious problems with North Col's foundations. In the Haven compound the Nomads are mulling over the impasse with the rain machine. Monsoon arrives with tales of a distant valley, high in the mountains beyond, where the Nomads have ever ventured. Legend has it that it is home to a huge cube of pure Thunderstone. The Nomads agree on an excursion there. They have to find out if the Thunderstone cube is more than a myth. It could be the key to saving the animals. The relentless trek upwards in the heat seems to be fruitless. The thirsty Nomads eventually find the mystical Valley of Chazon, but instead of a Thunderstone cube, there is a great lake in the valley floor. Arushka collapses by the shore in despair when she discovers that the clear blue lake is salt water.
35	9	"New Hope"	Julian McSwiney	David Phillips	October 8, 1999
Arushka, Noah and Sundance notice a curious resonance about the Valley. Even Dolly the sheepdog senses it. Noah discovers that the whole atmosphere is electrically charged. Sundance volunteers to swim and discovers a square blue object at the bottom of the lake! But how can the Nomads move the enormous Thunderstone Cube? Arushka is determined to overcome any obstacle and end the drought. She and Noah use the PH-Ts to travel back to the valley to a time before the lake filled its floor. After all, in the past Noah and Arushka have moved elephants in time, what's to stop them transporting the cube to present-day Haven? Noah tunes up the PH-Ts but the cube resists the white light and Noah and Arushka find they haven't moved it at all. Clearly something bigger than the PH-Ts is required. Much of the technology required to create the rain machine is what also enables the PH-Ts. Its all to do with the manipulation of sub-atomic particles of light. If Noah could build the PH-T technology into the Beast, the Protectors' old truck now sitting in the Nomads compound, it could be converted not only into a larger time machine, but also a rain machine. First Noah must travel back to North Col and gather the components he needs. In exchange for access to the rain machine blueprints Myah insists that Rorden accompany Noah. In the Holodeck, Noah enlists Becky's help to keep an eye on Rorden. Noah sneaks down to the storeroom to assemble more equipment. But he is unaware of the dangerous fault in North Col's exhaust line. Noah and Rorden narrowly escape discovery, leaving poor Becky to face the music once again. Back in Haven, Noah contemplate the most difficult task of his life. Can he turn the Beast into an effective time/rain machine, driven by the Cube, or will Arushka's hopes for the animals be dashed forever?
36	10	"The Bad Surprise"	Julian McSwiney	Marieke Hardy	October 15, 1999
Myah instructs her brothers to co-operate fully in the task of converting the Beast into a rain machine. Old rivalry sparked between Lyal and Sundance. Geneva tells Tod of her misgivings about bringing Thunderstone back into their lives. She's seen how harmful the valuable material can be when it falls into the wrong hands. Noah, working under immense pressure, finally finishes converting the Beast. The Nomads and the Family pile into the vehicle and Noah transports them back in time, to the Valley of Chazon. While the whole party is busy manoeuvering the Cube onto the Beast's roof, the brakes give away. Geneva is trapped in the ca and the Beast picks up speed and hurtles towards a cliff. She refuses to jump to safety and abandon the Thunderstone cube upon which the future of Haven rests. With quick thinking and courage she manages to avert disaster. The Beast, with the Cube secured on its roof, is white-lighted back to Razorback Ridge in Haven. At Noah's command a great blue beam is thrown to the heavens. Clouds roll into the sky and amidst crashes of thunder and swirling winds, the rain begins. A lyrical montage shows us the animals relief, waterholes starting to fill and water trickling into dry creek beds. Back in North Col, Becky and her parents are concerned. Structural damage is worsening but Syndia persists with the cover up. Liz plans to confront her at the next triumvirate meeting. At the compound, Noah and the Nomads fall contentedly asleep. listening to the raindrops on the roof. But up on the Ridge, the family are silently taking possessing of the Beast. Rorden struggles to activate the machine – but why? The next morning Arushka and Noah are out with Moshi, inspecting the relief on the land and animals when Moshie is spooked by Rorden, Lyal and Tod. As Arushka pursues the horse, Noah is Noah is taken prisoner. Myah is waiting in the Beast and delivers Noah an ultimatum: he will take them to the Silver City in the year 2235.
37	11	"Evacuation"	Julian McSwiney	Peter Kinloch	October 22, 1999
Myah tells Noah the truth. She and her brothers stole the precious Thunderstone Cube from the Silver City. As punishment they were banished through time forever. But they secretly rigged the banishment program so it would send them to the very same place and time as the Thunderstone Cube – Haven. Noah realises he's been tricked into furthering the Family's evil master plan. The Beast is now a super weapon, able to rain down destruction anywhere, starting with the Silver City. And since Rorden can't work it, they'll take Noah, by force. The disintegration of North Col is now obvious. Syndia proposes evacuation but Becky and her parents know nobody can survive in the snow. Maybe Noah will have a solution… The Nomads besiege the Beast and after a struggle recapture it. Becky arrives in the middle of the fight to tell Noah of North Col's plight. With the Nomads safely inside, he whites the Beast out, leaving Myah frustrated. Noah and the Nomads arrive to witness the total collapse of the Mall and the destruction of the holodeck. On the snowfields above, Noah angles the Beast's beam downwards and the whole colony is sent back to the safely of two weeks prior. Now Noah and the Nomads must deal with Haven. But as they leave North Col, Myah and the Brothers white in. Myah tells Becky and her parents that if they want to see Noah alive again, they must accompany her back to Haven. Back at the Compound, Noah and Arushka contemplate the Cube under a full moon. The prismatic affect the Cube has in combination with the moonlight reveals some astonishing secrets to Noah. Thunderstone has the property of annihilating itself! If he took the Beast back to the year of the Nemesis Comet, he could use the beam to disintegrate it. There would never be an impact… Noah could create a new future!
38	12	"The Super Weapon"	Mark DeFriest	Barbara Bishop	October 29, 1999
Myah and her brothers hold Becky and her parents hostage. But when Noah is about to give himself up, another Noah enters the grotto. Becky has brought the Noahgram! Myah releases them, believing it's the real Noah. Back at the compound, Noah states his plan to destroy the comet. Liz reminds him that if he does alter the future there will be no Haven. A vote is taken and it is decided that Noah should stop the comet for the greater good. Myah having seen through the Noahgram, arrives at the Compound to see Noah and Arushka white-out. They arrive in the year 2002 at Cortillo Plain. This is the command site for the rocket attack on the Comet which is already on course for Earth. They confront General Cardell, the commanding officer and ask him to abandon the plan to use nuclear weapons to destroy the comet. Cardell dismisses them as cranks. In Haven, Geneva accidentally gives away part of Noah's plan to Tod. Noah tries to warn the world of the imminent mistake on television, but Cardell stops the broadcast. Pursued by security vehicles and helicopters, Noah and Arushka race in to an empty hangar where they white out, leaving the General Cardell absolutely confounded. Back in Haven, its decided the Nomads must take the Beast back to Cortillo Plain and preempt the rocket strike themselves. Liz won't go since she used to work at Cortillo and would meet herself. Noah's father Simon and Becky elect to stay behind with her, but she and Noah quietly confer: there may be a way they can all be reunited. The Nomads and Noah pile into the Beast along with Moshi and Dolly. The Beast appears on Cortillo Plain but Myah and the brothers are clinging on to the trailer. They've made the journey as well!
39	13	"Before the Comet"	Mark DeFriest	Barbara Bishop	November 5, 1999
The Nemesis Comet is hurtling past the Moon towards Earth. It is so close now it can be seen looming in the skies above the General Store, where the Nomads are refueling the Beast. The Nomads head straight for the Cortillo Plain installation. Sundance, an uneasy rookie driver, steers the Beast across country and through the installation's security fencing. Meanwhile, Myah and her brothers have commandeered a security vehicle and are sneaking past the installation's guards in a more subtle fashion. In the Operations room General Cardell ignores a young scientist's warnings about the disastrous effect his nuclear rockets will have on the Nemesis comet. The young scientist is Liz Frankiln, Noah's mother! This is an added problem for Noah and Arushka, who are hiding in the shadows. If they don't get the young Liz on a helicopter and back to the safety of the underground North Col research facility, Noah might not even be born! It's less than an hour till the rockets are launched and the Nomads are heading for the radio telescope. Arushka is on Moshi, riding alongside the Beast. Myah and the brothers, having failed to waylay Noah at the installation, are in hot pursuit in the security van. Arushka wheels them off course, causing their vehicle to overturn on the rocky desert plain. Noah aligns the Beast's projector with the radio telescope reflector. Myah, dishevelled from the crash, is determined to stop Noah from saving the Earth from the impact and wasting the precious Thunderstone Cube. Arushka wrestles her away from the Beast's controls, leaving Noah free to make the frantic last minute adjustments. As the rocket launch countdown nears zero, Noah hits go, sending the beam skywards. The Nemesis Comet is shattered and its blue rock dissipates harmlessly into space. While everyone else is staring at the spectacle in the sky, Myah and her brothers look down in horror. They are literally disappearing! And in Haven the Daniels and Monsoon watch the animals disappear and the landscape change. "Now!" says Becky and dons the PH-Ts Noah left for her. The Daniels and Monsoon arrive at Cortillo Plain for a brief reunion with Noah and the Nomads before Noah makes a final command and they all white-out together – side-stepping time to somewhere in the future.

== Season 3 (2000) ==
No. overall	No. in season	Title	Directed by	Written by	Original release date
40	1	"Episode 40"	Julian McSwiney	David Phillips	June 16, 2000
It is the year 2020 where Noah Daniels is famous for discovering time travel, saving the world, and making the colonisation of space possible. Noah's comfortable existence is shattered when a gang of vengeful kids travel back to Earth through space and time from the colony on E-Delta – using the wormhole technology Noah invented – and kidnap his best friend Arushka.
41	2	"Episode 41"	Julian McSwiney	David Phillips	June 23, 2000
Arushka is held captive on the planet E-Delta, where the Bioplex structure is the only thing that stands between the inhabitants and their hostile environment. You can't last long outside without an oxygen pack and during the time of the red giant sun, you can't last at all. Drako, the handsome leader of the E-Delta kids, advises Arushka to get used to her new home she's sixty million light years from Earth and any hope of rescue. Noah and the Nomads have other ideas as Chip impulsively jumps through Noah's experimental wormhole. Noah pursues him and the two emerge on E-Delta and make their way inside the settlement after rescuing one of the young colonists.
42	3	"Episode 42"	Julian McSwiney	Barbara Bishop	June 30, 2000
Noah meets Curly, a grizzly old hologram who tells him why the E-Delta kids want revenge against Earth and their mortal enemy – Noah Daniels himself! He and Chip must break Arushka out of the Bioplex and get back to Earth before anyone discovers his identity. Meanwhile, on Earth, the animals in the Wildlife Reserve are under threat with Arushka away.
43	4	"Episode 43"	Julian McSwiney	Peter Kinloch	July 7, 2000
Drako and his gang make another raid on Earth, this time targeting the Horizon Foundation where Noah works. After forcing Noah's mother to give them access to the Foundation's encrypted computer files, they are surprised by Arushka while trying to escape with Noah. Arushka stops Drako from taking Noah back through a wormhole and in the confusion, a young member of the raiding party is left behind. Clio is alone and terrified by the strange beasts in the Wildlife Reserve.
44	5	"Episode 44"	Julian McSwiney	Peter Kinloch	July 14, 2000
After Drako's raid, Horizon Foundation security orders Noah be confined to his home for his own safety until the crisis is over. Chip finds Clio in the Wildlife Reserve and together with Arushka and Kwan, begins to teach Clio about animals. In return, Clio shows them that not all E-Delta kids are bad. While confined to home, Noah searches the files Drako stole in an effort to determine what he came to Earth for. When Drako returns for Clio, Kwan and Arushka (along with Moshi), follow their new friend through the wormhole to E-Delta. Kwan is taken prisoner by Drako while Arushka flees into the hostile wasteland. Apra decrypts the files stolen from the Horizon Foundation, revealing the location of a very special asteroid in orbit around Earth. With a deadly wall of sand approaching, Arushka has no choice but to return to the Bioplex. Drako takes Arushka in but leaves Moshi out in the storm.
45	6	"Episode 45"	Julian McSwiney	Jenny Sharp	July 21, 2000
Chip helps Noah escape from his guarded home and the pair quickly discover their friends have been taken to E-Delta. Clio and Curly join forces to help Kwan and Arushka rescue Moshi. With the Bioplex's energy reserves running low, Drako decides to returns to Earth to deliver Noah an ultimatum: the safe return of his friends in exchange for a canister of Thunderstone. Drako double crosses Noah, taking the canister and destroying Earth's only wormhole transporter.
46	7	"Episode 46"	Mark DeFriest	Barbara Bishop	July 28, 2000
Apra commences construction of a robot drone which will deliver the E-Delta kids' revenge on Earth. Arushka is furious when Drako brings animals from the Wildlife Reserve through a huge wormhole – how will they survive on E-Delta? Meanwhile, Noah and Liz are "borrowing" equipment from their now off-limits lab in order to construct a makeshift wormhole transporter.
47	8	"Episode 47"	Mark DeFriest	Helen McWhirter	August 4, 2000
Mr. Greenway confesses to helping Drako steal the animals and gives Noah the final clue he needs to piece together what Drako has in store for Earth. Arushka and Kwan's plan for getting themselves and the animals back home goes horribly wrong when Drako decides to take Moshi out for a ride.
48	9	"Episode 48"	Mark DeFriest	Helen McWhirter	August 11, 2000
Moshi saves Drako from being trapped outside the Bioplex under the red giant sun. Ivan loses confidence in Drako's leadership and dishes out his own punishment to anyone who helped Arushka escape with the animals. Noah and Arushka prepare to return to E-Delta to rescue their friends and put a stop to Drako's evil plan. Kwan must continue to pretend he stayed behind on E-Delta on purpose. How long will it be before his true loyalty is discovered by Ivan?
49	10	"Episode 49"	Mark DeFriest	Peter Kinloch	August 18, 2000
While the young Nomads set up camp in a cave shelter, Noah and Arushka infiltrate the Bioplex. The key to Drako's strike on Earth is the Thunderstone canister. In the process of seizing it, Noah meets a hologrammatic version of himself at 45 years of age, who sheds some light on why the E-Delta colony went bad.
50	11	"Episode 50"	Mark DeFriest	David Phillips	August 25, 2000
Noah and Drako are put in an uncomfortable situation when a wormhole opened by Liz brings them back to Earth alone. Ivan seizes the opportunity to assume leadership and take over the strike on Earth. Drako must reassess his opinion of Noah when he saves him from drowning. The two boys, once mortal enemies, strike a deal that will benefit E-Delta and save Earth from destruction.
51	12	"Episode 51"	Mark DeFriest	Barbara Bishop	September 1, 2000
Noah must find out what happened to the lost parents of the E-Delta kids to keep Earth from being put under attack by E-Delta. Little does he know that Ivan has imprisoned Drako along with the other Nomads. Ivan sends the robot drone, with the canister, through a wormhole to the thunderstone ring surrounding earth. noah and his family shelter from a hail of falling rocks, the first sign that the asteroid belt is spiralling in towards the planet Earth.
52	13	"Episode 52"	Mark DeFriest	Barbara Bishop	September 8, 2000
Noah discovers the secret to making E-Delta fertile, but first he must stop the Thunderstone Ring from crushing Earth. The strain of executing the strike on Earth has made E-Delta unstable and the kids are evacuated from the Bioplex in the hope that salvation will arrive before the red giant rises. Noah must bring the thunderstone ring through space-time in a crazy attempt to save two worlds and right past mistakes.
