= List of The Footy Show (AFL) episodes =

The Footy Show is a Logie Award winning Australian sports and variety entertainment television program, shown on the Nine Network and its affiliates. The show, which is dedicated to the Australian Football League (AFL) and Australian rules football, made its debut on 24 March 1994. The show has won several Logies. Originally hosted by Eddie McGuire, from its inception in 1994 to 2005, he was replaced in the 2006 season by Garry Lyon and James Brayshaw.

== Series overview ==
Series	Episodes	Originally aired	
Series	Episodes	Series premiere	Series finale
1	28	24 March 1994	29 September 1994
2	-		28 September 1995
3	-		26 September 1996
4	-		25 September 1997
5	-		24 September 1998
6	-		23 September 1999
7	-		31 August 2000
8	-		27 September 2001
9	-		26 September 2002
10	-		25 September 2003
11	28	18 March 2004	23 September 2004
12	29	10 March 2005	22 September 2005
13	27	29 March 2006	28 September 2006
14	29	15 March 2007	27 September 2007
15	29	13 March 2008	25 September 2008
16	29	12 March 2009	24 September 2009
17	30	11 March 2010	30 September 2010
18	30	10 March 2011	29 September 2011
19	29	14 March 2012	27 September 2012
20	30	7 March 2013	26 September 2013
21	30	6 March 2014	25 September 2014
22	29	19 March 2015	1 October 2015

== Episodes ==
=== Season 22 (2015) ===
No. in series	No. in season	Airdate	Timeslot	Guests	Notable Item	Street Talk Location	Viewers
623	1	19 March 2015	8:30pm Thursday	Chris Judd, Dyson Heppell, Billy Brownless	Crawf at Dyson’s House	The Arnold Classic Australia	636,000
624	2	26 March 2015	8:30pm Thursday	Dane Swan, Jarryd Roughead, Shane Crawford	Hughesy sprays Melbourne	Springvale	910,000
625	3	1 April 2015	8:30pm Wednesday	Nick Dal Santo, Brendon Goddard, Billy Brownless	Hughesy sprays Richmond	Werribee	
626	4	9 April 2015	8:30pm Thursday	Joel Selwood, Josh Gibson, Shane Crawford	Hughesy sprays Port Adelaide	Dandenong	
627	5	16 April 2015	8:30pm Thursday	Brett Deledio, Bernie Vince, Billy Brownless	Garry's stand-up	No Street Talk	574,000
628	6	23 April 2015	8:30pm Thursday	Jobe Watson, Steve Johnson, Billy Brownless	Anzac Day Tribute	Lygon Street, Carlton	
629	7	30 April 2015	8:30pm Thursday	Adam Cooney, Brian Lake, Shane Crawford	Old man Crawf vs. Melbourne Players	No Street Talk	696,000
630	8	7 May 2015	8:30pm Thursday	Jack Riewoldt, Nick Dal Santo, Shane Crawford	Sam and Garry tour Garry's birthplace, Devonport	Hobart	613,000
631	9	14 May 2015	8:30pm Thursday	Dane Swan, Chris Judd, Billy Brownless	Hughesy sprays North Melbourne & Old man Crawf vs. Carlton Players	Frankston	702,000
632	10	21 May 2015	8:30pm Thursday	Dyson Heppell, Brett Deledio, Shane Crawford	Hughesy sprays Sydney & Sam survives Warwick Capper	No Street Talk	524,000
633	11	28 May 2015	8:30pm Thursday	Jarryd Roughead, Steven Motlop, Billy Brownless	Hughesy sprays Geelong & Old man Crawf vs. Hawthorn Players	Footscray (with Shane Crawford)	649,000
