= List of The Real Housewives of Sydney episodes =

The Real Housewives of Sydney is an Australian reality television series that premiered on 26 February 2017 on Arena. After a six-year hiatus, the series was revived by streaming service Binge and premiered in October 2023. It chronicles the lives of eight women in and around Sydney, Australia— Krissy Marsh, Nicole O'Neil, Kate Adams, Terry Biviano, Caroline Gaultier, Victoria Montano, Sally Obermeder and Martine Chippendale —as they balance their personal and professional lives, along with their social circle.

Former cast members featured over the previous seasons are: AthenaX Levendi (1), Lisa Oldfield (1), Victoria Rees (1), Matty Samaei (1), and Melissa Tkautz (1).

As of 6 May 2025, 34 original episodes of The Real Housewives of Sydney have aired over three seasons.

== Series overview ==
Series	Episodes	Originally released	
Series	Episodes	First released	Last released
1	12	26 February 2017	14 May 2017
2	11	10 October 2023	19 December 2023
3	11	25 February 2025	6 May 2025

== Episodes ==
=== Season 1 (2017) ===
AthenaX Levendi, Krissy Marsh, Nicole O'Neil, Lisa Oldfield, Victoria Rees, Matty Samaei, and Melissa Tkautz are introduced as series regulars.

No. overall	No. in season	Title	Original release date	Overnight Australian viewers
1	1	"Jatz Crackers"	26 February 2017	195,000
We meet the seven housewives. Nicole kicks off the series with hosting a welcome home party where all the ladies are together for the first time. Lisa labels Krissy as Chewbacca and tensions flare between AthenaX and Victoria.
2	2	"Branch of Olive"	5 March 2017	188,000
Victoria confides in Krissy to help find her father, AthenaX and Melissa go shopping, Victoria hosts a lunch with a white dress code. AthenaX quizzes Matty about her profession which makes her upset and Lisa and Krissy clash over a social media post.
3	3	"Greek Goddess"	12 March 2017	171,000
Lisa, Nicole and AthenaX meet up after the luncheon, Melissa invites Matty to watch some sneak peaks of her new feature film Boar. Krissy and Nicole go house hunting and the ladies (except for Matty) celebrate AthenaX’s birthday and Victoria invites the ladies to the Whitsunday Islands.
4	4	"All At Sea"	19 March 2017	187,000
The ladies travel to the Whitsunday Islands. Lisa, Matty and Nicole go snorkelling, Melissa and AthenaX relax by the beach and Victoria and Krissy go Stand Up Paddle Boarding. The ladies have a lunch by the beach where Lisa arrives late due to being caught in a rip whilst snorkelling. The ladies meet up for dinner where Lisa reveals it’s her wedding anniversary to all the women.
5	5	"For Art's Sake"	26 March 2017	187,000
The ladies return from the Whitsunday Islands, AthenaX hosts an art exhibition and invites some of the ladies. Krissy clashes with both AthenaX and Lisa.
6	6	"Persian Party"	2 April 2017	194,000
Matty goes shopping for caviar for a Persian Party. AthenaX and Lisa go dress shopping. The women come together for Matty’s party where temperatures reach boiling point between Nicole and AthenaX.
7	7	"Heartfelt Charity"	9 April 2017	196,000
AthenaX discusses the party with her husband. Lisa invites Matty, Melissa and AthenaX to her house. Victoria, Krissy, Nicole, Melissa and Matty attend the Wrinkles Schminkles launch where a gift from AthenaX is mistreated.
8	8	"Singapore Slings"	16 April 2017	154,000
Melissa invites the ladies to join her a modelling trip to Singapore, in what they hope will be the perfect opportunity to regroup after a rocky few weeks.
9	9	"Hotel Ruffles"	23 April 2017	177,000
The ladies' trip to Singapore takes a hard turn as Lisa and Athena X come to blows. They struggle to get their friendship back on track before returning to Sydney.
10	10	"Anti Aging"	30 April 2017	185,000
Matty throws a raunchy launch party for her Forever Young pillow brand, while Mel is off shooting her latest movie scene.
11	11	"Fur Wedding"	7 May 2017	196,000
Matty is asked to be maid of honour at an interspecies wedding, and Athena hosts an opulent breakfast for Lisa, Nicole and Krissy. Meanwhile, gossip transforms into rumours that Charles Billich sleeps with his muses.
12	12	"Reunion"	14 May 2017	189,000
The women see each other for the first time in a long time to discuss the season. Victoria and AthenaX clash which sees Victoria storm off set. Lisa accuses Krissy of throwing a dead cat over her fence. Nicole also discusses her issues with Lisa and Nicole, Melissa and Victoria discuss their issues with AthenaX.

=== Season 2 (2023) ===
Levendi, Oldfield, Rees, Samaei and Tkautz departed as series regulars. Kate Adams, Terry Biviano, Caroline Gaultier, Victoria Montano, and Sally Obermeder joined the cast.

No. overall	No. in season	Title	Original release date	Overnight Australian viewers
13	1	"That Whole Eastern Suburbs Thing"	10 October 2023	20,000
14	2	"Role Models"	17 October 2023	22,000
15	3	"Rock the Boat"	24 October 2023	20,000
16	4	"I'd Rather Be in Switzerland"	31 October 2023	N/A
17	5	"Dressed to Killcare"	7 November 2023	N/A
18	6	"Friend or Faux?"	14 November 2023	N/A
19	7	"This Is Going to Require Some Vodka"	21 November 2023	20,000
20	8	"Tokyo Rift"	28 November 2023	24,000
21	9	"Terry-aki Beef"	5 December 2023	18,000
22	10	"There's No Place Like Home"	12 December 2023	21,000
23	11	"Reunion"	19 December 2023	20,000

=== Season 3 (2025) ===
Martine Chippendale joined the cast.

No. overall	No. in season	Title	Original release date	Australian viewers (National) (Note: On 28 January 2024, OzTAM's ratings data recording system changed. Viewership data now focuses on National Total ratings instead of providing data on the 5 metro centres and overnight shares.)
24	1	"Glow Up to Blow Up"	25 February 2025	N/A
Following tensions within the group, Sally brings the ladies back together, with the addition of Victoria's neighbour and best friend, Martine.
25	2	"Noosa Nights, Not Noosa Fights"	4 March 2025	N/A
Krissy invites the ladies to Noosa for a luxurious getaway. But it's a no-show from one of the group that has everyone fired up.
26	3	"Did You Miss Me?"	11 March 2025	N/A
Fresh from their trip to Noosa, the Sydney ladies gather for an exclusive fashion event, where Martine confronts Krissy's relentless jabs, and Caroline's attempt at reconciling with Kate ends in total disaster.
27	4	"The Devil Wears Red"	18 March 2025	N/A
After a turbulent Fashion Week event stirs up old grudges within the group, Terry enlists Melbourne socialite and transformation coach, Jackie Gillies, for a healing session.
28	5	"Land of the Long Dark Cloud"	25 March 2025	N/A
Terry's healing session leads to dramatic walkouts as tensions simmer between the ladies. Sally hatches a plan to reunite the group for a girls trip in stunning New Zealand.
29	6	"Ice Ice Maybe"	1 April 2025	N/A
As the New Zealand getaway begins, Nicole and Caroline are notably absent from the trip.
30	7	"BDE in NZ"	8 April 2025	N/A
Following Martine's dramatic walkout, the ladies release their tensions by diving into some adrenaline-packed adventures. However, with Martine still absent, doubts grow about whether she will rejoin the group.
31	8	"Game, Set, and Rematch"	15 April 2025	N/A
As the group returns back to Sydney, unresolved tensions begin to resurface. Passive-aggressive confrontations between the ladies threaten to disrupt Victoria's tennis day.
32	9	"Faux From Head to Toe"	22 April 2025	N/A
As Martine grieves the loss of her mother, tensions reach boiling point among Nicole, Caroline, Terry and Kate. Shocking revelations are revealed at Sally's high tea event.
33	10	"All That Glitters Is Not Gold"	29 April 2025	N/A
All eight women reunite for the first time in over a year at the very opulent VIP Glitterati party.
34	11	"The Reunion"	6 May 2025	N/A
The ladies return to face off in a fiery reunion, hosted by Osher Günsberg.
