= List of Offspring: The Nurses webisodes =

The following is a list of webisodes for the Australian web series, Offspring: The Nurses.

As of 20 July 2011, there have been 26 webisodes of Offspring: The Nurses released online.

== Webisodes ==
=== Web Series 1 (2010) ===
The first web series follows nurses Kim (Alicia Gardiner) and Zara (Jane Harber) from the original series. Andrew Garrick wrote and directed the first series.

Series 1 also stars Benedict Hardie, Julia Grace, Laura Gilham, Carl Nilsson Polias, Jodie Sheehy and Matthew Heyward as fellow staff members of the Hospital.

No. overall	No. in series	Title	Directed by	Written by
1	1	"Sperm Donor"	Andrew Garrick	Andrew Garrick
The Nurses, Kim and Zara, who work with Nina Proudman every day, continue their shifts. Kim asks Zara, if she were a man, would she give her her sperm.
2	2	"The Liaison"	Andrew Garrick	Andrew Garrick
Kim and Zara talk about romance in the workplace.
3	3	"The Name Dilemma"	Andrew Garrick	Andrew Garrick
Kim and Zara discuss whether or not your name decides your destiny. Kim talks about what she and her partner would like to call her child.
4	4	"The Cosmically Backwards Pregnancy/Empathy Theory"	Andrew Garrick	Andrew Garrick
Kim and Zara try to figure out what biscuits and grapefruit have to do with getting pregnant.
5	5	"The Pregnancy Dilemma"	Andrew Garrick	Andrew Garrick
Kim gets upset after telling her partner she's pregnant. Zara tries to comfort her with a Golden Gaytime.
6	6	"The Ducks & The Cravings"	Andrew Garrick	Andrew Garrick
While Kim is on hold after ordering chinese food, she talks to Zara about walking in on Nina and Chris.
7	7	"The Mind Reader"	Andrew Garrick	Andrew Garrick
Zara tries to convince everyone that she can read their minds.
8	8	"The Conscious Concept"	Andrew Garrick	Andrew Garrick
Zara tries to imagine what it's like to be in a coma.
9	9	"The Eyes of Babes"	Andrew Garrick	Andrew Garrick
Zara and Kim find a 'funny' looking baby at the hospital. Zara tries to change his nose.
10	10	"The Letter"	Andrew Garrick	Andrew Garrick
Kim and Zara talk to Liam about his new love from 'exotic' America.
11	11	"The Worst Thing & The Wheely Chair"	Andrew Garrick	Andrew Garrick
Kim and Zara talk about the worst things they've done to ex's.
12	12	"The Words Count"	Andrew Garrick	Andrew Garrick
Zara talk to Kim about the way she answers the phone and what her first words will be to her baby.
13	13	"The Dancing Inception"	Andrew Garrick	Andrew Garrick
Kim has a dream where all the staff were dancing in the Hospital hall. But was it really a dream?

=== Web Series 2 (2011) ===
The second web series again follows Zara (Jane Harber) and this time Justina Noble as Nurse Tyra. Benedict Hardie, who stars in the series, wrote with Andrew Garrick for the second series. Garrick again directed for the web series.

Series 2 also stars Benedict Hardie, Harry Milas, Josh Price, Natalie Kaplan, Sonja Kowanjko and Kate Hopkins. Richard Davies and Lachy Hulme also made guest appearances.

No. overall	No. in series	Title	Directed by	Written by
14	1	"Why Be Nice, Zara?"	Andrew Garrick	Andrew Garrick and Benedict Hardie
Zara meets Tyra, a new nurse at the hospital.
15	2	"Let's All Get Along, Tyra"	Andrew Garrick	Andrew Garrick and Benedict Hardie
Zara and Tyra work on some ground rules and try to bond with one another.
16	3	"Ah, Nuts"	Andrew Garrick	Andrew Garrick and Benedict Hardie
Tyra is put in an awkward position after Dr. Clegg volunteers her for something she doesn't feel right about. Zara meets the brother of the patient they'll be taking care of, who turns out to be a magician.
17	4	"Dream-Weaver"	Andrew Garrick	Andrew Garrick and Benedict Hardie
Zara and Tyra meet up with the magician again as he tries to impress Zara with a miniature picnic and plenty of tricks.
18	5	"Conflicting Over Lovers"	Andrew Garrick	Andrew Garrick and Benedict Hardie
Zara and Tyra clash over a boy in the office.
19	6	"Sorry, You're Breaking Up"	Andrew Garrick	Andrew Garrick and Benedict Hardie
Zara breaks up with her magician friend and shares a muesli bar with Tyra.
20	7	"Hello, Jimmy"	Andrew Garrick	Andrew Garrick and Benedict Hardie
Zara and Jimmy get to know each other a little better.
21	8	"She's Got the Look"	Andrew Garrick	Andrew Garrick and Benedict Hardie
Zara proves she really does have the look.
22	9	"Clegg Whisperer"	Andrew Garrick	Andrew Garrick and Benedict Hardie
Zara and Jimmy talk to a drunk Dr. Martin Clegg after he ends his fling with Cherie.
23	10	"Cheers Everybody"	Andrew Garrick	Andrew Garrick and Benedict Hardie
Zara, Jimmy and Clegg are all at the bar again!
24	11	"Scandinafricans"	Andrew Garrick	Andrew Garrick and Benedict Hardie
Tyra is attracted to the new learning nurse at the Hospital, 'Tall Paul'.
25	12	"Programmable Babies"	Andrew Garrick	Andrew Garrick and Benedict Hardie
Zara and Paul talk about the fact they could be able to program babies.
26	13	"Poetry in Motion"	Andrew Garrick	Andrew Garrick and Benedict Hardie
The girls find some poetry that Dr. Clegg has written.
