= List of Sons and Daughters episodes =

Sons and Daughters ran for a total of 972 episodes over six seasons.

== Overview ==
Season	Original broadcast (ATN7 and HSV7 Australia)		No. of episodes	
Season	Season premiere	Season finale	No. of episodes	
1	18 January 1982 (SYD/MEL)	11 November 1982 (SYD/MEL)	174	1–174
2	31 January 1983 (SYD/MEL)	11 November 1983 (SYD/MEL)	178	175–352
3	6 February 1984 (MEL) 26 February 1984 (SYD)	9 November 1984 (MEL) 14 January 1985 (SYD)	176	353–528
4	13 January 1985 (MEL) 20 January 1985 (SYD)	4 November 1985 (MEL) 8 November 1985 (SYD)	168	529–696
5	13 January 1986 (SYD) 20 January 1986 (MEL)	6 November 1986 (SYD) 10 November 1986 (MEL)	172	697–868
6	4 January 1987 (SYD) 18 January 1987 (MEL)	27 December 1987 (SYD) 10 January 1988 (MEL)	104	869–972

Season One
Episode	Plot	Writer	Director	Original Air Date
1	A chance meeting revives the link between the Hamiltons in Sydney and the Palmers in Melbourne. Twins, separated at birth meet twenty years after growing up in different cities and circumstances.	Reg Watson	Ross McGregor	January 18, 1982
2	A chance meeting revives the link between the Hamiltons in Sydney and the Palmers in Melbourne. Twins, separated at birth meet twenty years after growing up in different cities and circumstances.	Reg Watson	Ross McGregor	January 18, 1982
3	A chance meeting revives the link between the Hamiltons in Sydney and the Palmers in Melbourne. Twins, separated at birth meet twenty years after growing up in different cities and circumstances.	Reg Watson	Ross McGregor	January 18, 1982
4	Scott' saves Angela after she falls from a horse, later she takes 'Scott' to hers and they agree to meet again.	Reg Watson, John Alsop	Ross McGregor	January 19, 1982
5	John's brother Kevin writes an article about what happened at the murder scene and tells his friend Lynn,'Scott' arrives at Angela's and meets the family.	Bevan Lee	Brian Faull	January 20, 1982
6	Angela's mother Patricia Hamilton makes 'Scott' feel out of place, later Beryl Palmer gets a call from her stepson - John Palmer. John's father is David Palmer.	Maureen Ann Moran	Brian Faull	January 21, 1982
7	Lynn's father won't allow his daughter to go to John's sister's wedding to Bill Todd - who killed John's boss. John and Angela kiss. Later 'Scott' asks the killer to clear his name!	Rick Maier	Brian Faull	January 25, 1982
8	John tells Bill where he is staying and Bill Todd calls the police and tells them where he is.	Christine McCourt	Brian Faull	January 26, 1982
9	There's a police chase but John manages to escape. David discovers his wife Beryl met his son in a market and feels he is guilty. John figures that his friend Bill is the murderer but when he calls home his sister Susan tells him he is around the bend and to leave the family alone. In a plan to keep Angela away, Fiona's best friend Jill pretends she is pregnant with 'Scott's' child!	Geoffrey Atherden	Wayne Cameron	January 27, 1982
10	John feels useless when Bill tells him he has an alibi and later feels upset because he has nothing to offer Angela. David's father finds Kevin and Lynn in bed together and tells David that if they carry on they'll make the same mistake he did 20 years ago with Patricia!	Bevan Lee	Wayne Cameron	January 28, 1982
11	John confronts Fiona about the pregnancy lies and tells her that he's going to ring Angela and tell her that he loves her... then Fiona blurts out that there is something you don't know. Puzzled John is about to ignore her and then she tells John that Angela Hamilton is actually his sister.	Bevan Lee	Wayne Cameron	February 1, 1982
	John doesn't believe Fiona until she shows him photos of young David and Patricia...Patricia has Angela and Wayne as her kids, Wayne is her second child with Gordon Hamilton. Wayne is spiteful and is spying on 'Scott' for his mother. Gordon and Wayne have an argument and the polite Gordon calls him useless in which Wayne breaks down.	David Phillips	Wayne Cameron	February 2, 1982
13	Patricia decides Simon Armstrong is a posh boy and should go out with Angela rather than 'Scott'. Angela tries to make John jealous at the stud where 'Scott' is working for Gordon and kisses Simon in front of him. Later as John is about to walk out, his father David is about to walk in through the same door!	Don Battye	Denny Lawrence	February 3, 1982
14	John pops into Jill's as she lives across the hall while his father walks along the hallway. She lets him in and she asks David what he thinks of her decorating. John hears his voice and hides in Jill's. Fiona and David have a heart to heart, meanwhile Angela tells her mother that she is getting engaged to Simon and she announces the news to the party in the other room. We then see John is there and he walks out. Patricia says it's a surprise! in which Simon's mother Barbera replies I couldn't think of a better word...although Angela looks unhappy as if she's made the wrong decision.	Christine McCourt	Denny Lawrence	February 4, 1982
15	Barbera shouts at bitchy Patricia and she apologises for announcing it so soon, Kevin and Lynn go to Susan and Bill's new flat that Kev is decorating but end up in bed again! Kevin and Lynn are only 17...Bill and Susan are out hunting and Bill shoots a rabbit, which Susan is horrified about. Then Bill sees that the rabbit is still alive so batters the animal to death with the end of his gun. Susan looks horrified and gets the freeze frame.	Maureen Ann Moran	Denny Lawrence	February 8, 1982
16	The next day Susan is still furious over the incident that had occurred so Bill decides they'll go home after breakfast. Kevin and Lynn wake up on a mattress naked when David and Susan walk in! David orders Lynn out at once and sends Kevin to the car. David feels ashamed and gets the freeze frame.	Bevan Lee	Denny Lawrence	February 9, 1982
17	Later David calls Lynn's parents but Kevin tells him that he can't stop them seeing each other, Wayne tells 'Scott' at the stud that even though Angela is engaged that he's sure she'd be up for a roll in the hay and after the comment 'Scott' punches Wayne in the face and they brawl. Gordon has to let 'Scott' go when he admits he threw the first punch and Wayne smiles at the incident. Patricia calls round at Fiona's to tell her to mind her own business and Fiona snaps that to Patricia that she dumped half of her family. Fiona reveals that she brought the second twin up. Patricia then replies My god, your nephew Scott... he's my son... is he is Scott my son? she gets the freeze frame.	Geoffrey Atherden	Philip Bowman	February 10, 1982
18	Patricia questions why 'Scott's' last name is 'Edwards'. Fiona tells her that he went to live with a family in Brisbane when he was 5. Fiona says that for some strange reason he wanted to know what his mother was like and Patricia replies that she couldn't agree more and tells her that she didn't care about him 20 years ago and she certainly doesn't give a damn about him now. 'Scott' and Angela patch things up and Barbera tells Wayne she recognises 'Scott' from a newspaper report and admits she never forgets a face. Wayne replies that it could be worth looking into.	Susan Smith	Philip Bowman	February 11, 1982
19	Fiona visits Beryl & David Palmer, she then tells them that they should got to dinner that night...including killer Bill Todd. Spiteful Wayne offers 'Scott' a lift home but overhears a Conversation between 'Scott' and Jill where she tells 'Scott' that she thinks her pretend pregnancy is going too far! Wayne later tells Angela everyone is laughing at her behind her back, elsewhere Kevin is lovesick when Lynn sends a letter after she's forced to leave by her father. Angela cancels the wedding and Wayne comes back showing her newspaper articles about 'Scott' being a murderer...and his real name John Palmer...!	Michael Boughen	Philip Bowman	February 15, 1982
20	We discover Fiona was last night left alone with Bill and they discussed the John Palmer murder business... she then hints that "you help your friends...'.Wayne tells Angela he's ringing the police about John and she runs out of the house...Angela finds John after driving around and they go to a motel when she tells him Wayne has rung the police. She tells him she believes he didn't murder his boss Sam. The police call at Jill's telling her that 'Scott' is really John and that he is wanted for murder and she is horrified but lets them into Fiona's apartment...Fiona and Beryl prepare for another dinner with the family, meanwhile John gets out of Angela's vehicle and runs in front of a police car to give himself up. Kevin tells Bill that Fiona looked after John when he was little in which Bill responds with a shocked expression...Fiona begins reading Kevin's tarot cards and tells Bill's mum Nora that she has the card of the two lovers probably Bill & Susan although Nora suddenly tells her she wants to read Bill's tarot card and one says he was a problem child but the other Fiona is shocked and hides it... Nora demands to know but is horrified when Fiona points out the hanged man! Wayne tells Patricia about the real John Palmer and because she's his mother she is incredibly angry with him calling him terrible names. John is taken to jail and Jill rings Fiona explaining. Fiona tells her she'll do something! Later Fiona confronts Bill and tells him she knows he killed his boss and he tells her the police won't listen but Fiona dials the number! However she's arrested for covering for John and Nora is shocked when Bill tells her that she's his alibi. But she goes through with the plan and the police believe her. Later Bill and Nora have a heart to heart and she shakily asks "what's going to happen to us Billy?"	John Alsop	Philip Bowman	February 16, 1982
21	Bill convinces his mother not to say anything or else, David tells his wife Beryl that Fiona was stupid to get mixed up with John and he probably paid her to get a room. Angela and Gordon put the wedding money towards John's court bail when later Wayne tells Gordon that Angela was involved sexually with a married man last year and she tells her step dad a few home truths about Wayne and ultimately he calls his solicitor and tells them to forget helping John! John calls Susan and tells her that Bill is the murderer just before the wedding between Susan & Bill begins...Angela leaves the house after a blazing argument with her father and Patricia tells him it's not fair. Fiona tells Beryl when released on bail that she needs to see David but Beryl tells Fiona that David is visiting John, which Fiona replies 'then David will hear the truth from John...'. David storms in angry that John never spoke to him and Fiona tells him the truth. David says John is a coward but Beryl angrily admits "if John can look me in the eye and tell me Bill did it then I'll believe him!" Later Nora tells Bill that if he loves Susan he'll hand himself in and tells him she loves him and Bill looks scared. Shockingly not long after Bill tells Susan he loves her but than adds "I killed Sam Selmar " Susan is terrified. After a discussion Susan drives Bill to the police station where he tells her again he loves her and he approaches the police station doors and he gets the freeze frame.	Bevan Lee	Brian Faull	February 17, 1982
22	Fiona hears Bill has confessed on the phone and she looks pleased while Kevin however looks upset saying "How could he do that to Susan?" John returns home and Susan tells David she wants to go to the Palmers to apologise to John, she then apologises to him but tells her family she still loves Bill even though he has murdered...Jill visits Angela and tells her John is free and Wayne hears and tells them it's great news but a shame she sold her car for no reason. Angela comes up with the idea that she can use the money she sold her car with to visit John! Patricia and Gordon meet Jill and then Jill and Angela go to the office to tell Gordon the news. Then Wayne tells Patricia and that Angie is visiting John tomorrow! Patricia is shocked that the brothers & sisters will meet...Wayne pulls up in the car near Jill and tells her that he'll take her to dinner at 7:30 and drives off before she can get a word in. Pat rings John to tell him Angela's on his way and that he must tell her that they're finished without exposing them being related. John tells Angela he doesn't love her and she's a snob and she runs off weeping.	Christine McCourt	Brian Faull	February 18, 1982
23	Fiona tells John he's starting to be a pain in the neck doing Patricia's dirty work and John rings Pat to tell her that he told her to leave. Patricia is grateful but John is not interested and hangs up. Wayne admits plan A&B didn't work but gives Jill a kitten and says will plan C? Jill loves the kitten and tells him she'll call it plan C! John decides to stay at home and tells Fiona he'll miss her and that he'll visit her. Wayne and Jill end up kissing and Wayne moves plan C off the bed because it's needed for other matters...at the prison Bill apologises to John and they both put their hands up against the glass because "it's the closest they can get ".	Geoffrey Atherden	Brian Faull	February 22, 1982
24	Patricia waits for Angela to get back from Melbourne and Angela runs through the door upset over what happened between her and John. Jill arranges to cook dinner for Wayne tomorrow night at 8:30 and he agrees. Jill leaves her apartment to see Fiona and then confesses that she has been seeing Wayne and is enjoying his company. Angela visits Jill asking her advice and after confessing she still loves John, Jill tells Angela to move out and become independent. What to do. Meanwhile, Wayne meets up with a business man - Brian. However he is blown away by his daughter and invites them both to dinner but is more than pleased when brian cancels - but daughter 'Jackie' does not. Jill is heart broken when Wayne cancels their dinner but Jill acts as if she doesn't care and hangs up. She walks across the road and tells Fiona that she feels like "to hell with the Hamilton's." and Fiona and Jill have dinner. Angela looks upset and steps down the stairs at home and leaves a letter by the phone in the hallway. Bags packed she leaves home. The image freezes on her leaving.	Maureen Ann Moran	Brian Faull	February 23, 1982
25	Fiona finds Angela in the hallway at the boarding house. Angela asks if she can stay and Fiona politely shows her to a room. Patricia phones Gordon and reads him the note when Wayne walks in and laughs. He adds that he's had a great night with a very nice lady and that her couldn't give a damn about Angela. Angela walks in with plan C and asks where Jill got her from but Jill said she just wandered in. Jackie is rubbing Wayne's chest on the beach and he tells her he'll try get out of the business meal but after ringing Jill and arranging dinner he gets back to Jackie and says he couldn't get out of it. At Beryl's parents house - Bob's she watches over her daughters Susan and Bob playing badminton but when Susie sees her grandfather's wedding ring she tells him that she forgets but not for long...Susan takes a walk in the woods but when she sees a man killing a rabbit she immediately flashes back to what happened with Bill. Wayne visits Jill and she is fuming but tells him Angela is staying but he adds what she doesn't know can't hurt her. Angela hears Jill laughing with Wayne and sees them both together! She runs off and when Jill goes after her Wayne makes a phone call to Jackie saying he'll pick her up in half an hour. He smiles to himself.	Bevan Lee	Wayne Cameron	February 24, 1982
26	Jill and Fiona search the streets for Angela while Wayne leaves the apartment. They find Angela with a man and decide to go home. In the night Angela creeps back to the boarding house and takes her things and leaves. The next morning Jill wakes Fiona telling her that Angela has gone...Fiona visits Patricia and Pat tells Wayne it's none of his business and lets her in. Fiona tells Patricia that Angela was with a boyfriend last night and maybe wouldn't have left if Patricia wasn't being selfish and told her John was her twin. She leaves telling Patricia that either she does it or she'll do it herself. John gets the job that David helps him get at his warehouse job. Gordon picks up Angela outside a cafe telling him she needs help and he persuades her to come home. Gordon calls a doctor to calm down Angie and he's successful. Later Patricia rings Fiona telling her she wants John to come to Sydney. Fiona says it's a good idea but Patricia snaps "I don't care what you think just get him here". Patricia then says "I'm going to tell them the truth..." the theme credits roll.	Christine McCourt	Wayne Cameron	February 25, 1982
27	John arrives at Fiona's and tells her that his father is unaware he is up in Sydney as he's out on a job. Later John arrives at Dural ( Patricia's home ) and Wayne welcomes him. However, not without apologizing about telling the cops. As Angela, John, Gordon, Wayne and Pat gather in the living room Patricia goes on about how Gordon only thought she had one child... "I'm sorry darling, but Angela has a brother, a twin brother - John Palmer.", they both stare at each other. After Angela deals with the shock her and John get on well and she says that's why they just "well clicked." Angela and John agree Angie should meet her father David in Melbourne...Patricia is shocked by the decision whereas Gordon understands. Angela is truly grateful of Gordon telling him she'll ring but runs out when her mother comes down the stairs. She gets into a cab with John and leaves without saying bye to her mother. Afterwards in Melbourne John comes home and says he has something important to tell his father. Kevin leaves the room. John tells his dad about going up to Sydney and meeting a girl Angela - " and then meeting her mother Patricia! " David tells John he thought he saw the last of her years ago and John replies that Angela wants to meet her dad. David tidies up and explains to Kevin while John goes to a hotel where Angela is staying. Kevin thinks it's great and Angela and John pull up outside. the sons and daughters instrumental theme plays while Angela walks up to the house with John. Inside David pulls forward to shake his hand but Angela runs and hugs him fondly.	John Alsop	Wayne Cameron	March 1, 1982
28	TBA	Don Battye	Wayne Cameron	March 2, 1982
29	TBA	Bevan Lee	Peter Sharp	March 3, 1982
30	TBA	Christine McCourt	Peter Sharp	March 4, 1982
31	TBA	Maureen Ann Moran	Peter Sharp	March 8, 1982
32	TBA	Peter Pinne	Peter Sharp	March 9, 1982
33	TBA	Susan Swinford	Alister Smart	March 10, 1982
34	TBA	Christine McCourt	Alister Smart	March 11, 1982
35	TBA	Bevan Lee	Alister Smart	March 15, 1982
36	TBA	Bevan Lee	Alister Smart	March 16, 1982
37	TBA	John Alsop	Denny Lawrence	March 17, 1982
38	TBA	Christine McCourt	Denny Lawrence	March 18, 1982
39	TBA	Geoffrey Atherden	Denny Lawrence	March 22, 1982
40	TBA	Maureen Ann Moran	Denny Lawrence	March 23, 1982
41	TBA	Peter Pinne	Phillip Bowman	March 24, 1982
42	TBA	Bevan Lee	Philip Bowman	March 25, 1982
43	TBA	Christine McCourt	Philip Bowman	March 29, 1982
44	TBA	John Alsop	Philip Bowman	March 30, 1982
45	TBA	Don Battye	Peter Sharp	March 31, 1982
46	TBA	Christine McCourt	Peter Sharp	April 1, 1982
47	TBA	Geoffrey Atherden	Peter Sharp	April 5, 1982
48	TBA	Maureen Ann Moran	Peter Sharp	April 6, 1982
49	TBA	Bevan Lee	Alister Smart	April 7, 1982
50	TBA	Bevan Lee	Alister Smart	April 8, 1982
51	TBA	John Alsop	Alister Smart	April 12, 1982
52	TBA	Bevan Lee	Alister Smart	April 13, 1982
53	TBA	Christine McCourt	Denny Lawrence	April 14, 1982
54	TBA	Maureen Ann Moran	Denny Lawrence	April 15, 1982
55	TBA	Peter Pinne	Denny Lawrence	April 19, 1982
56	TBA	Bevan Lee	Mark Piper	April 20, 1982
57	TBA	Don Battye	Graeme Hodgson	April 21, 1982
58	TBA	Christine McCourt	Graeme Hodgson	April 22, 1982
59	TBA	Bevan Lee	Graeme Hodgson	April 26, 1982
60	TBA	John Alsop	Graeme Hodgson	April 27, 1982
61	TBA	Stephen Measday, Bevan Lee	Peter Sharp	April 28, 1982
62	TBA	Maureen Ann Moran	Peter Sharp	April 29, 1982
63	TBA	John Alsop	Mark Piper	May 3, 1982
64	TBA	Don Battye	Mark Piper	May 4, 1982
65	TBA	Bevan Lee	Alister Smart	May 5, 1982
66	TBA	Christine McCourt	Alister Smart	May 6, 1982
67	TBA	Maureen Ann Moran	Alister Smart	May 10, 1982
68	TBA	Maureen Ann Moran	Alister Smart	May 11, 1982
69	TBA	Bevan Lee	Denny Lawrence	May 12, 1982
70	TBA	Maureen Ann Moran	Denny Lawrence	May 13, 1982
71	TBA	Peter Pinne	Denny Lawrence	May 17, 1982
72	TBA	Bevan Lee	Denny Lawrence	May 18, 1982
73	TBA	Bevan Lee	Greg Shears	May 19, 1982
74	TBA	Bevan Lee	Greg Shears	May 20, 1982
75	TBA	Don Battye	Greg Shears	May 24, 1982
76	TBA	John Alsop	Greg Shears	May 25, 1982
77	TBA	Don Battye	Peter Sharp	May 26, 1982
78	TBA	Maureen Ann Moran	Peter Sharp	May 27, 1982
79	TBA	John Alsop	Peter Sharp	May 31, 1982
80	TBA	Don Battye	Peter Sharp	June 1, 1982
81	TBA	Melvyn Morrow	Graeme Hodgson	June 2, 1982
82	TBA	Don Battye	Graeme Hodgson	June 3, 1982
83	TBA	Maureen Ann Moran	Mark Piper	June 7, 1982
84	TBA	Peter Pinne	Mark Piper	June 8, 1982
85	TBA	Don Battye	Denny Lawrence	June 9, 1982
86	TBA	John Alsop	Denny Lawrence	June 10, 1982
87	TBA	Ray Kolle	Denny Lawrence	June 14, 1982
88	TBA	Bevan Lee	Denny Lawrence	June 15, 1982
89	TBA	Bevan Lee	Greg Shears	June 16, 1982
90	TBA	Maureen Ann Moran	Greg Shears	June 17, 1982
91	TBA	Peter Pinne	Greg Shears	June 21, 1982
92	TBA	David Allen	Greg Shears	June 22, 1982
93	TBA	Melvyn Morrow	Peter Sharp	June 23, 1982
94	TBA	Bevan Lee	Peter Sharp	June 24, 1982
95	TBA	Don Battye	Peter Sharp	June 28, 1982
96	TBA	Maureen Ann Moran	Peter Sharp	June 29, 1982
97	TBA	Ray Kolle	Graeme Hogdson	June 30, 1982
98	TBA	John Alsop	Graeme Hodgson	July 1, 1982
99	TBA	Don Battye	Graeme Hodgson	July 5, 1982
100	TBA	Bevan Lee	Graeme Hodgson	July 6, 1982
101	TBA	Bevan Lee	Denny Lawrence	July 7, 1982
102	TBA	Sally Webb	Denny Lawrence	July 8, 1982
103	TBA	John Alsop	Denny Lawrence	July 12, 1982
104	TBA	Ray Kolle	Denny Lawrence	July 13, 1982
105	TBA	Maureen Ann Moran	Mark Piper	July 14, 1982
106	TBA	Greg Stevens	Mark Piper	July 15, 1982
107	TBA	Peter Pinne	Mark Piper	July 19, 1982
108	TBA	Bevan Lee	Mark Piper	July 20, 1982
109	TBA	John Alsop	Peter Sharp	July 21, 1982
110	TBA	Bevan Lee	Peter Sharp	July 22, 1982
111	TBA	Don Battye	Peter Sharp	July 26, 1982
112	TBA	Bevan Lee	Peter Sharp	July 27, 1982
113	TBA	Sally Webb	Graeme Hodgson	July 28, 1982
114	TBA	Greg Stevens	Graeme Hogdson	July 29, 1982
115	TBA	Maureen Ann Moran	Graeme Hodgson	August 2, 1982
116	TBA	Bevan Lee	Graeme Hodgson	August 3, 1982
117	TBA	Peter Pinne	Greg Shears, Sam Simmonds	August 4, 1982
118	TBA	Don Battye	Greg Shears	August 5, 1982
119	TBA	John Alsop	Greg Shears, Sam Simmonds	August 9, 1982
120	TBA	Bevan Lee	Greg Shears, Sam Simmonds	August 10, 1982
121	TBA	Sally Webb	Mark Piper	August 11, 1982
122	TBA	Bevan Lee	Mark Piper	August 12, 1982
123	TBA	Don Battye	Mark Piper	August 16, 1982
124	TBA	Don Battye	Mark Piper	August 17, 1981
125	TBA	Don Battye	Denny Lawrence	August 18, 1982
126	TBA	Bevan Lee	Denny Lawrence	August 19, 1982
127	TBA	John Alsop	Denny Lawrence	August 23, 1982
128	TBA	Ray Kolle	Denny Lawrence	August 24, 1982
129	TBA	Don Battye	Graeme Hodgson	August 25, 1982
130	TBA	Don Battye	Graeme Hodgson	August 26, 1982
131	TBA	Don Battye	Graeme Hodgson	August 30, 1982
132	TBA	Bevan Lee	Graeme Hodgson	September 1, 1982
133	TBA	Ray Kolle	Colin Budds	September 2, 1982
134	TBA	Greg Stevens	Colin Budds	September 3, 1982
135	TBA	Maureen Ann Moran	Colin Budds	September 6, 1982
136	TBA	Bevan Lee	Colin Budds	September 7, 1982
137	TBA	Peter Pinne	Mark Piper	September 8, 1982
138	TBA	Greg Stevens	Mark Piper	September 9, 1982
139	TBA	John Alsop	Mark Piper	September 13, 1982
140	TBA	Bevan Lee	Mark Piper	September 14, 1982
141	TBA	Ray Kolle	Denny Lawrence	September 15, 1982
142	TBA	Don Battye	Denny Lawrence	September 16, 1982
143	TBA	Maureen Ann Moran	Denny Lawrence	September 20, 1982
144	TBA	Ray Kolle	Denny Lawrence	September 21, 1982
145	TBA	Don Battye	Graeme Hodgson	September 22, 1982
146	TBA	Greg Stevens	Graeme Hodgson	September 23, 1982
147	TBA	John Alsop	Graeme Hodgson	September 27, 1982
148	TBA	Ray Kolle	Graeme Hodgson	September 28, 1982
149	TBA	Don Battye	Geoffrey Nottage	September 29, 1982
150	TBA	Don Battye	Geoffrey Nottage	September 30, 1982
151	TBA	TBA	TBA	October 4, 1982
152	TBA	TBA	TBA	October 5, 1982
153	TBA	TBA	TBA	October 6, 1982
154	TBA	TBA	TBA	October 7, 1982
155	TBA	TBA	TBA	October 11, 1982
156	TBA	TBA	TBA	October 12, 1982
157	TBA	TBA	TBA	October 13, 1982
158	TBA	TBA	TBA	October 14, 1982
159	TBA	Maureen Ann Moran	Denny Lawrence	October 18, 1982
160	TBA	Ray Kolle	Denny Lawrence	October 19, 1982
161	TBA	Peter Pinne	Greg Shears	October 20, 1982
162	TBA	Don Battye	Graeme Hodgson	October 21, 1982
163	TBA	John Alsop	Graeme Hodgson	October 25, 1982
164	TBA	Greg Stevens, Bevan Lee	Graeme Hodgson	October 26, 1982
165	TBA	Bill Searle	Greg Shears	October 27, 1982
166	TBA	Peter Pinne	Greg Shears	October 28, 1982
167	TBA	Christine Schofield	Greg Shears	November 1, 1982
168	TBA	Ray Kolle	Greg Shears	November 2, 1982
169	TBA	Don Battye	Mark Piper	November 3, 1982
170	TBA	Greg Stevens	Mark Piper	November 4, 1982
171	TBA	Ray Kolle	Mark Piper	November 8, 1982
172	TBA	John Alsop	Karl Zwicky	November 9, 1982
173	TBA	Bill Searle	Denny Lawrence	November 10, 1982
174	TBA	Bevan Lee	Denny Lawrence	November 11, 1982

Plot	Episode	Season	Original Air Date
We discover the story of Patricia and David	1	1	January 18, 1982
20 years later the kids Pat and David have had are separated and don't know each other, Bill Todd asks his boss for his job back...but kills him in rage...!	2	1	January 18, 1982
John hears police arrive and runs, he heads to his aunt Fiona's who gives him a new identity 'Scott'	3	1	January 18, 1982
'Scott' saves Angela after she falls from a horse, later she takes 'Scott' to hers and they agree to meet again	4	1	January 19, 1982
John's brother Kevin writes an article about what happened at the murder scene and tells his friend Lynn,'Scott' arrives at Angela's and meets the family...	5	1	1982
Angela's mother Patricia Hamilton makes 'Scott' feel out of place, later Beryl Palmer gets a call from her stepson - John Palmer. John's father is David Palmer...	6	1	1982
Lynn's father won't allow his daughter to go to John's sister's wedding to Bill Todd - who killed John's boss. John and Angela kiss. Later 'Scott' asks the killer to clear his name!	7	1	1982
John tells Bill where he is staying and Bill Todd calls the police and tells them where he is...	8	1	1982
There's a police chase but John manages to escape. David discovers his wife Beryl met his son in a market and feels he is guilty. John figures that his friend Bill is the murderer but when he calls home his sister Susan tells him he is around the bend and to leave the family alone. In a plan to keep Angela away, Fiona's best friend Jill pretends she is pregnant with 'Scott's' child!	9	1	1982
John feels useless when Bill tells him he has an alibi and later feels upset because he has nothing to offer Angela. David's father finds Kevin and Lynn in bed together and tells David that if they carry on they'll make the same mistake he did 20 years ago with Patricia!	10	1	1982
John confronts Fiona about the pregnancy lies and tells her that he's going to ring Angela and tell her that he loves her... then Fiona blurts out that there is something you don't know. Puzzled John is about to ignore her and then she tells John that Angela Hamilton is actually his sister...	11	1	1982
John doesn't believe Fiona until she shows him photos of young David and Patricia...Patricia has Angela and Wayne as her kids, Wayne is her second child with Gordon Hamilton. Wayne is spiteful and is spying on 'Scott' for his mother. Gordon and Wayne have an argument and the polite Gordon calls him useless in which Wayne breaks down...	12	1	1982
Patricia decides Simon Armstrong is a posh boy and should go out with Angela rather than 'Scott'. Angela tries to make John jealous at the stud where 'Scott' is working for Gordon and kisses Simon in front of him. Later as John is about to walk out, his father David is about to walk in through the same door!	13	1	1982
John pops into Jill's as she lives across the hall while his father walks along the hallway. She lets him in and she asks David what he thinks of her decorating. John hears his voice and hides in Jill's. Fiona and David have a heart to heart, meanwhile Angela tells her mother that she is getting engaged to Simon and she announces the news to the party in the other room. We then see John is there and he walks out. Patricia says it's a surprise! in which Simon's mother Barbera replies I couldn't think of a better word...although Angela looks unhappy as if she's made the wrong decision.	14	1	1982
Barbera shouts at bitchy Patricia and she apologises for announcing it so soon, Kevin and Lynn go to Susan and Bill's new flat that Kev is decorating but end up in bed again! Kevin and Lynn are only 17...Bill and Susan are out hunting and Bill shoots a rabbit, which Susan is horrified about. Then Bill sees that the rabbit is still alive so batters the animal to death with the end of his gun. Susan looks horrified and gets the freeze frame.	15	1	1982
The next day Susan is still furious over the incident that had occurred so Bill decides they'll go home after breakfast. Kevin and Lynn wake up on a mattress naked when David and Susan walk in! David orders Lynn out at once and sends Kevin to the car. David feels ashamed and gets the freeze frame	16	1	1982
Later David calls Lynn's parents but Kevin tells him that he can't stop them seeing each other, Wayne tells 'Scott' at the stud that even though Angela is engaged that he's sure she'd be up for a roll in the hay and after the comment 'Scott' punches Wayne in the face and they brawl. Gordon has to let 'Scott' go when he admits he threw the first punch and Wayne smiles at the incident. Patricia calls round at Fiona's to tell her to mind her own business and Fiona snaps that to Patricia that she dumped half of her family. Fiona reveals that she brought the second twin up. Patricia then replies My god, your nephew Scott... he's my son... is he is Scott my son? she gets the freeze frame.	17	1	1982
Patricia questions why 'Scott's' last name is 'Edwards'. Fiona tells her that he went to live with a family in Brisbane when he was 5. Fiona says that for some strange reason he wanted to know what his mother was like and Patricia replies that she couldn't agree more and tells her that she didn't care about him 20 years ago and she certainly doesn't give a damn about him now. 'Scott' and Angela patch things up and Barbera tells Wayne she recognises 'Scott' from a newspaper report and admits she never forgets a face. Wayne replies that it could be worth looking into...	18	1	
Fiona visits Beryl & David Palmer, she then tells them that they should got to dinner that night...including killer Bill Todd. Spiteful Wayne offers 'Scott' a lift home but overhears a Conversation between 'Scott' and Jill where she tells 'Scott' that she thinks her pretend pregnancy is going too far! Wayne later tells Angela everyone is laughing at her behind her back, elsewhere Kevin is lovesick when Lynn sends a letter after she's forced to leave by her father. Angela cancels the wedding and Wayne comes back showing her newspaper articles about 'Scott' being a murderer...and his real name John Palmer...!	19	1	
We discover Fiona was last night left alone with Bill and they discussed the John Palmer murder business... she then hints that "you help your friends...'.Wayne tells Angela he's ringing the police about John and she runs out of the house...Angela finds John after driving around and they go to a motel when she tells him Wayne has rung the police. She tells him she believes he didn't murder his boss Sam. The police call at Jill's telling her that 'Scott' is really John and that he is wanted for murder and she is horrified but lets them into Fiona's apartment...Fiona and Beryl prepare for another dinner with the family, meanwhile John gets out of Angela's vehicle and runs in front of a police car to give himself up. Kevin tells Bill that Fiona looked after John when he was little in which Bill responds with a shocked expression...Fiona begins reading Kevin's tarot cards and tells Bill's mum Nora that she has the card of the two lovers probably Bill & Susan although Nora suddenly tells her she wants to read Bill's tarot card and one says he was a problem child but the other Fiona is shocked and hides it... Nora demands to know but is horrified when Fiona points out the hanged man! Wayne tells Patricia about the real John Palmer and because she's his mother she is incredibly angry with him calling him terrible names. John is taken to jail and Jill rings Fiona explaining. Fiona tells her she'll do something! Later Fiona confronts Bill and tells him she knows he killed his boss and he tells her the police won't listen but Fiona dials the number! However she's arrested for covering for John and Nora is shocked when Bill tells her that she's his alibi. But she goes through with the plan and the police believe her. Later Bill and Nora have a heart to heart and she shakily asks "what's going to happen to us Billy?"	20	1	
Bill convinces his mother not to say anything or else, David tells his wife Beryl that Fiona was stupid to get mixed up with John and he probably paid her to get a room. Angela and Gordon put the wedding money towards John's court bail when later Wayne tells Gordon that Angela was involved sexually with a married man last year and she tells her step dad a few home truths about Wayne and ultimately he calls his solicitor and tells them to forget helping John! John calls Susan and tells her that Bill is the murderer just before the wedding between Susan & Bill begins...Angela leaves the house after a blazing argument with her father and Patricia tells him it's not fair. Fiona tells Beryl when released on bail that she needs to see David but Beryl tells Fiona that David is visiting John, which Fiona replies 'then David will hear the truth from John...'. David storms in angry that John never spoke to him and Fiona tells him the truth. David says John is a coward but Beryl angrily admits "if John can look me in the eye and tell me Bill did it then I'll believe him!" Later Nora tells Bill that if he loves Susan he'll hand himself in and tells him she loves him and Bill looks scared. Shockingly not long after Bill tells Susan he loves her but than adds "I killed Sam Selmar " Susan is terrified. After a discussion Susan drives Bill to the police station where he tells her again he loves her and he approaches the police station doors and he gets the freeze frame	21	1	
Fiona hears Bill has confessed on the phone and she looks pleased while Kevin however looks upset saying "How could he do that to Susan?" John returns home and Susan tells David she wants to go to the Palmers to apologise to John, she then apologises to him but tells her family she still loves Bill even though he has murdered...Jill visits Angela and tells her John is free and Wayne hears and tells them it's great news but a shame she sold her car for no reason. Angela comes up with the idea that she can use the money she sold her car with to visit John! Patricia and Gordon meet Jill and then Jill and Angela go to the office to tell Gordon the news. Then Wayne tells Patricia and that Angie is visiting John tomorrow! Patricia is shocked that the brothers & sisters will meet...Wayne pulls up in the car near Jill and tells her that he'll take her to dinner at 7:30 and drives off before she can get a word in. Pat rings John to tell him Angela's on his way and that he must tell her that they're finished without exposing them being related. John tells Angela he doesn't love her and she's a snob and she runs off weeping.	22	1	
Fiona tells John he's starting to be a pain in the neck doing Patricia's dirty work and John rings Pat to tell her that he told her to leave. Patricia is grateful but John is not interested and hangs up. Wayne admits plan A&B didn't work but gives Jill a kitten and says will plan C? Jill loves the kitten and tells him she'll call it plan C! John decides to stay at home and tells Fiona he'll miss her and that he'll visit her. Wayne and Jill end up kissing and Wayne moves plan C off the bed because it's needed for other matters...at the prison Bill apologises to John and they both put their hands up against the glass because "it's the closest they can get ".	23	1	
Patricia waits for Angela to get back from Melbourne and Angela runs through the door upset over what happened between her and John. Jill arranges to cook dinner for Wayne tomorrow night at 8:30 and he agrees. Jill leaves her apartment to see Fiona and then confesses that she has been seeing Wayne and is enjoying his company. Angela visits Jill asking her advice and after confessing she still loves John, Jill tells Angela to move out and become independent. What to do. Meanwhile, Wayne meets up with a business man - Brian. However he is blown away by his daughter and invites them both to dinner but is more than pleased when brian cancels - but daughter 'Jackie' does not. Jill is heart broken when Wayne cancels their dinner but Jill acts as if she doesn't care and hangs up. She walks across the road and tells Fiona that she feels like "to hell with the Hamilton's." and Fiona and Jill have dinner. Angela looks upset and steps down the stairs at home and leaves a letter by the phone in the hallway. Bags packed she leaves home. The image freezes on her leaving...	24	1	
Fiona finds Angela in the hallway at the boarding house. Angela asks if she can stay and Fiona politely shows her to a room. Patricia phones Gordon and reads him the note when Wayne walks in and laughs. He adds that he's had a great night with a very nice lady and that her couldn't give a damn about Angela. Angela walks in with plan C and asks where Jill got her from but Jill said she just wandered in. Jackie is rubbing Wayne's chest on the beach and he tells her he'll try get out of the business meal but after ringing Jill and arranging dinner he gets back to Jackie and says he couldn't get out of it. At Beryl's parents house - Bob's she watches over her daughters Susan and Bob playing badminton but when Susie sees her grandfather's wedding ring she tells him that she forgets but not for long...Susan takes a walk in the woods but when she sees a man killing a rabbit she immediately flashes back to what happened with Bill. Wayne visits Jill and she is fuming but tells him Angela is staying but he adds what she doesn't know can't hurt her. Angela hears Jill laughing with Wayne and sees them both together! She runs off and when Jill goes after her Wayne makes a phone call to Jackie saying he'll pick her up in half an hour. He smiles to himself	25	1	1982
Jill and Fiona search the streets for Angela while Wayne leaves the apartment. They find Angela with a man and decide to go home. In the night Angela creeps back to the boarding house and takes her things and leaves. The next morning Jill wakes Fiona telling her that Angela has gone...Fiona visits Patricia and Pat tells Wayne it's none of his business and lets her in. Fiona tells Patricia that Angela was with a boyfriend last night and maybe wouldn't have left if Patricia wasn't being selfish and told her John was her twin. She leaves telling Patricia that either she does it or she'll do it herself. John gets the job that David helps him get at his warehouse job. Gordon picks up Angela outside a cafe telling him she needs help and he persuades her to come home. Gordon calls a doctor to calm down Angie and he's successful. Later Patricia rings Fiona telling her she wants John to come to Sydney. Fiona says it's a good idea but Patricia snaps "I don't care what you think just get him here". Patricia then says "I'm going to tell them the truth..." the theme credits roll.	26	1	1982
John arrives at Fiona's and tells her that his father is unaware he is up in Sydney as he's out on a job. Later John arrives at Dural ( Patricia's home ) and Wayne welcomes him. However, not without apologizing about telling the cops. As Angela, John, Gordon, Wayne and Pat gather in the living room Patricia goes on about how Gordon only thought she had one child... "I'm sorry darling, but Angela has a brother, a twin brother - John Palmer.", they both stare at each other. After Angela deals with the shock her and John get on well and she says that's why they just "well clicked." Angela and John agree Angie should meet her father David in Melbourne...Patricia is shocked by the decision whereas Gordon understands. Angela is truly grateful of Gordon telling him she'll ring but runs out when her mother comes down the stairs. She gets into a cab with John and leaves without saying bye to her mother. Afterwards in Melbourne John comes home and says he has something important to tell his father. Kevin leaves the room. John tells his dad about going up to Sydney and meeting a girl Angela - " and then meeting her mother Patricia! " David tells John he thought he saw the last of her years ago and John replies that Angela wants to meet her dad. David tidies up and explains to Kevin while John goes to a hotel where Angela is staying. Kevin thinks it's great and Angela and John pull up outside. the sons and daughters instrumental theme plays while Angela walks up to the house with John. Inside David pulls forward to shake his hand but Angela runs and hugs him fondly.	27	1	1982
