= List of Mustangs FC episodes =

Mustangs FC is an Australian comedy drama TV series aimed at young teenagers and starring Emmanuelle Mattana as the lead character. The show is set in suburban Australia, and focuses on Mustangs FC, an all-girls soccer team, and focuses on Mattana's character, Marnie, who lives with her mother, Jen (played by Pia Miranda), her mother's boyfriend, Kev, and Kev's daughter, Lara, as well as Marnie's friends and teammates. Launched on International Day of the Girl in 2017, the show explores the relationship between team members, and the struggle to be taken seriously as an all-girls team. The show is airing in the US on Universal Kids and in the UK on CBBC.

As of January 1, 2020, 39 episodes have been produced and aired in a total of three seasons.

== Series overview ==
Season	Episodes	Originally released	
Season	Episodes	First released	Last released
1	13	October 11, 2017	October 23, 2017
2	13	January 1, 2019	January 16, 2019
3	13	January 1, 2020	January 1, 2020

== Episodes ==
=== Season 1 (2017) ===
No. overall	No. in season	Title	Directed by	Written by	Original release date
1	1	"Goals"	Tori Garrett	Michael Miller	October 11, 2017
It's the beginning of the season for brand new all-girl soccer team, Mustangs, and football tragic Marnie can't wait to get started. But with no coach, no uniforms and no players - can Marnie pull a team together?
2	2	"Like A Boss"	Tori Garrett	Kirsty Fisher	October 12, 2017
When the Mustangs get accused of 'playing like girls', it's the last straw for Marnie. It's time to prove themselves by beating the boys. So they challenge them to a golden goal game.
3	3	"Can't Even"	Tori Garrett	Rae Earl	October 13, 2017
Liv and Marnie fall out and when Liv turns to new team superstar, Ruby, for reassurance, Marnie loses it. Ruby is totally stealing her best friend as well as her position on the team.
4	4	"Game Changer"	Roger Hodgman	Warren Clarke	October 14, 2017
Lara is driving Marnie crazy and totally invading her space. But when Marnie posts an unflattering pic of Lara that goes viral, the sparkly girl goes out for revenge. She's going to hit Marnie where it hurts - the Mustangs.
5	5	"Girl Crush"	Roger Hodgman	Kirsty Fisher	October 15, 2017
Danny sacks Bella from the Mustangs after she messes up on the pitch. And to make matters worse, her dad says he's coming to watch her next game. How is she going to hide the fact that she's no longer even on the team?
6	6	"OTP"	Corrie Chen	Michael Miller	October 16, 2017
Lara tells Marnie that Gabe has a crush on her. But Marnie can't imagine kissing Gabe, or can she? Determined to move the budding romance forward, Lara organises a party.
7	7	"Kick Like A Girl"	Roger Hodgman	Michael Miller	October 17, 2017
At a tournament, the Mustangs are thrashed by the Wildcats in the first round. Do they need a new captain to pull the team together? And can Anusha handle being second banana to Bella and her new found confidence?
8	8	"Oh Em Gee"	Corrie Chen	Rae Earl	October 18, 2017
Marnie's hunch about Ruby going to the Wildcats turns out to be right, so she and Liv organise a nachos night in an attempt to get her to stay. But will guacamole and corn chips be enough to keep their star player onside?
9	9	"Flawless"	Corrie Chen	Magda Wozniak	October 19, 2017
When Lara sucks up to the mansplaining Tom, Marnie gets mad. But when Lara dives like a diva and gets awarded a dodgy free kick, Marnie totally loses it. Doesn't Lara realise that there's more to life than being looked at?
10	10	"R U OK?"	Fiona Banks	Kirsty Fisher	October 20, 2017
After a disappointing mark at school, Anusha throws herself into developing strategies for the team. But as her perfectionist friend unravels, Bella gets more and more concerned about Anusha.
11	11	"The Feels"	Fiona Banks	Kirsty Fisher	October 21, 2017
After encouraging Nush's disastrous tactics, Marnie has to girl up to a hostile team and rally the troops - it's the semis this weekend so it's time to set differences aside and do some hardcore training, Mustangs style.
12	12	"Slay"	Fiona Banks	Warren Clarke	October 22, 2017
13	13	"Mustangs Forever"	Fiona Banks	Michael Miller	October 23, 2017
The nail biting final is in play and the Mustangs and Wildcats are drawing 2-2. But when tensions rise pitch side - the game is called off and the Wildcats win on league points. But is this the end of the Mustangs story?

=== Season 2 (2019) ===
No. overall	No. in season	Title	Directed by	Written by	Original release date
14	1	"Wake Up Call"	Corrie Chen	Kristy Fisher	January 1, 2019
Back together again for a new season, the Mustangs are confident and hungry for some silverware... But can they win without Ruby?
15	2	"Shake Up Call"	Corrie Chen	Shanti Gudgeon	January 2, 2019
The Mustangs need to get serious before the season officially starts - time for some unusual training methods, player recruitment, and a big shake up of the team's formation.
16	3	"Get Real"	Corrie Chen	Magda Wozniak	January 3, 2019
Marnie struggles to accept her new position in the team, while an injury forces Lara to face giving up dreams of gym glory.
17	4	"The Doubt Worm"	Jess Harris	Rae Earl	January 4, 2019
Bella ends up in a spiral of self doubt after missing a goal - and everyone's opinions on how to help her only make it worse.
18	5	"No Pressure"	Jess Harris	Kristy Fisher	January 5, 2019
The grudge match against the Wildcats has everyone feeling the pressure, especially Marnie, who develops some obsessive pre-game rituals.
19	6	"Pity Party"	Jess Harris	Alix Beane	January 6, 2019
Marnie is forced to play friendship umpire when a team night watching soccer gets turned into a pity-party for heartbroken Liv, and Ruby's unexpected appearance divides the girls.
20	7	"In Sync"	Roger Hodgman	Magda Wozniak	January 7, 2019
Marnie and the team campaign to get sanitary bins for the Mustangs clubhouse, while Anusha struggles to find the balance between independence and the support she needs.
21	8	"You Do You"	Roger Hodgman	Rae Earl	January 8, 2019
Marnie has been keeping a secret from Liv and when it emerges, Liv questions whether soccer is really her passion.
22	9	"Sparkly Girls"	Roger Hodgman	Shanti Gudgeon	January 9, 2019
Playing in a skills camp with the best in the league, Marnie gets a wake up call - she's going to have to work a lot harder for her dream than she'd realised.
23	10	"Seven and Half Minutes"	Roger Hodgman	Kirsty Fisher	January 10, 2019
Marnie desperately wants to get scouted but to do that, she has to persuade Anton to let her play with the boys. And miss half of the Mustangs crucial semi-final.
24	11	"Step Up"	Ana Kokkinos	Magda Wozniak	January 11, 2019
After spying the Wildcats bullying Ruby, Anusha gets carried away with a plan to take action. But Ruby stands up for herself.
25	12	"Nailbiter"	Ana Kokkinos	Jonathan Gavin	January 12, 2019
The looming final against the Wildcats is sending everyone a bit crazy. Have the Mustangs got what it takes to finally win the trophy?
26	13	"Hoof Five!"	Ana Kokkinos	Kirsty Fisher	January 16, 2019
The penalty shootouts are nail-bitingly close but even after the whistle blows and the final score is announced, there's still one last surprise in store for the Mustangs.

=== Season 3 (2020) ===
No. overall	No. in season	Title	Directed by	Written by	Original release date
27	1	"Hurly Burly"	Ana Kokkinos	Kirsty Fisher	January 1, 2020
The Mustangs-Wildcats merger means constant fighting in the new team. If they want to win, it's time to make some big changes.
