= I Was a Rat =

- Also known as: Cinderella and Me
- Genre: Children's; Drama; Fantasy
- Based on: I Was a Rat!: or, The Scarlet Slippers by Philip Pullman; Cinderella, or The Little Glass Slipper by; Charles Perrault; the Brothers Grimm
- Written by: Richard Carpenter; Philip Pullman
- Directed by: Laurie Lynd
- Starring: Calum Worthy; Brenda Fricker; Tom Conti; Ned Beatty; Stephen Ouimette
- Countries of origin: United Kingdom; Canada
- Original language: English
- No. of series: 1
- No. of episodes: 3

Production
- Producer: Andy Rowley
- Running time: 55 minutes

Original release
- Network: BBC One
- Release: 9 December – 23 December 2001

I Was a Rat, also known as Cinderella and Me, is a children's three-part drama television series broadcast on BBC One from 9 to 23 December 2001, based on the popular 1999 children's novel I Was a Rat! or The Scarlet Slippers by Philip Pullman, in turn based on the folk tale Cinderella, or The Little Glass Slipper by Charles Perrault and the Brothers Grimm, to which it serves as a stand-alone sequel. It was aired in the Sunday tea-time slot which traditionally accommodates a children's drama series in the run-up to Christmas. The series was produced by Andy Rowley and starred Calum Worthy in the leading role, alongside Tom Conti and Brenda Fricker. It was adapted by Richard Carpenter, who won a BAFTA award for the work.

== Synopsis ==
The series is set in the early 1920s, telling the tale of a young boy with a mysterious past who claims to be a rat. He is taken in off the streets by elderly couple Bob (Conti) and Joan (Fricker) who name him Roger and it soon becomes obvious that he is no ordinary child.

== Cast and characters ==
- Calum Worthy as Roger/Ratty
- Brenda Fricker as Joan Jones
- Tom Conti as Bob Jones
- Ned Beatty as Mudduck
- Stephen Ouimette as Wheedle
- Katie Blake as Lady Aurelia Ashington/Mary Jane Potts
- James Millard as Prince Richard
- Karl Pruner as Julian
- Richard Graham as Charlie
- Denis Lill as Sergeant Piggles
- Don McKellar as Oliver Tapscrew
