= I Was a Rat! or, The Scarlet Slippers =

1999 children's novel by Philip Pullman

I Was a Rat! or The Scarlet Slippers
- First edition cover
- Author: Philip Pullman
- Language: English
- Genre: Children's, Fantasy
- Publisher: Doubleday
- Publication date: 1 April 1999
- Publication place: United Kingdom
- Pages: 175
- ISBN: 978-0-385-40979-7
- OCLC: 57378478

I Was a Rat! or The Scarlet Slippers is a children's novel written by British author Philip Pullman. Loosely based on the folk tale Cinderella, or The Little Glass Slipper, to which it serves as a stand-alone sequel, it was published in 1999.

A three-episode television miniseries adaptation of the novel aired on BBC One in 2001, starring Calum Worthy and Katie Blake.

== Plot ==
One evening, at the home of the cobbler old Bob and his washerwoman wife Joan, there is a knock at the door. Bob opens the door and sees a little boy in a torn and stained page's uniform. When asked "who are you?", the boy replies "I was a rat". Bob and Joan have no children and they take care of the boy by providing food and a bed. The boy is unable to eat with a spoon, and during his first evening he tears his sheets and blankets into strips. However, Bob and Joan are patient and the boy is a quick learner who, wanting to please them, carefully follows their instructions. When he spots a photograph of Princess Aurelia, the prince's fiancée, in the newspaper, he appears to recognise her as 'Mary Jane'.

Joan calls the boy "Roger", the name Bob and Joan would have used for their son. Bob and Joan take Roger to the City Hall to find how to return Roger to his proper home. An official declares that there are no lost children in the city, then notices that Roger has eaten a pencil belonging to the City Council. Bob and Joan take Roger to the orphanage, the police station, and the hospital, but no one can help locate Roger's home.

The Philosopher Royal learns about Roger and his belief that he was a rat, and takes Roger to the palace for tests. Roger announces that he has "been here before", and states that the Prince will marry Mary Jane, only to be told that the Prince will marry Aurelia. When confronted by a cat, Roger runs away from the palace and undergoes adventures as people exploit his ability to eat almost anything, and to wriggle through small openings. Roger escapes and lives in the sewers, but is discovered by the local paper, The Daily Scourge, who exploit Roger again by writing about "the monster of the sewers". After a publicity campaign, Roger is captured and declared a menace whose fate is to be determined by a tribunal.

Bob and Joan learn that the tribunal may declare Roger to be a non-human monster that must be exterminated. Joan notices a picture of Princess Aurelia who by now has married the Prince. Joan remembers that Roger had mentioned Mary Jane, so in desperation Bob and Joan contact the Princess. When hearing about Roger and the name "Mary Jane" she announces that she will help. Due to her intervention, Roger is saved and is adopted by Bob and Joan. The Princess had been a girl who worked in the kitchen and kept a pet rat. Her wish to attend a ball at the palace was granted, and her rat was turned into a page boy as her attendant – a "Cinderella story".

== Adaptation ==
A three-part televised adaptation of the novel simply entitled I Was a Rat was aired on the BBC in 2001. The series was produced by Andy Rowley and directed by Laurie Lynd and was adapted by Richard Carpenter, who won a BAFTA award for the work.

== See also ==
- The Coachman Rat, a 1989 novel with a similar premise
