= John Lawrence (illustrator) =

English illustrator and wood engraver

John Lawrence (born 15 September 1933 in Hastings) is an English illustrator and wood engraver.

He has twice won the Francis Williams Award for illustration (sponsored by the Victoria and Albert Museum, London), and twice been runner-up for the Kurt Emil - Maschler Award. He has also published children's books in his own right including This Little Chick which was a New York Times Book Review Best Illustrated Children’s Book of the Year. He was master of the Art Workers' Guild in 1990, and now lives in Cambridge.

== Education ==
Born in Hastings in 1933, John Lawrence was educated in Salesian schools, first in Burwash, Sussex then in Cowley, Oxfordshire, before attending Hastings School of Art (1951 - 1953). After National Service in West Africa he moved to the Central School of Art and Design (1955–1957) where he was introduced to wood engraving by Gertrude Hermes.

== Teaching ==
In the 1960s he taught at Brighton School of Art and then as a visiting professor of illustration at Camberwell School of Art until 1993.

Until 2010 he taught at Cambridge School of Art, lecturing on the M.A. course in Children's Book Illustration.

== Illustration ==
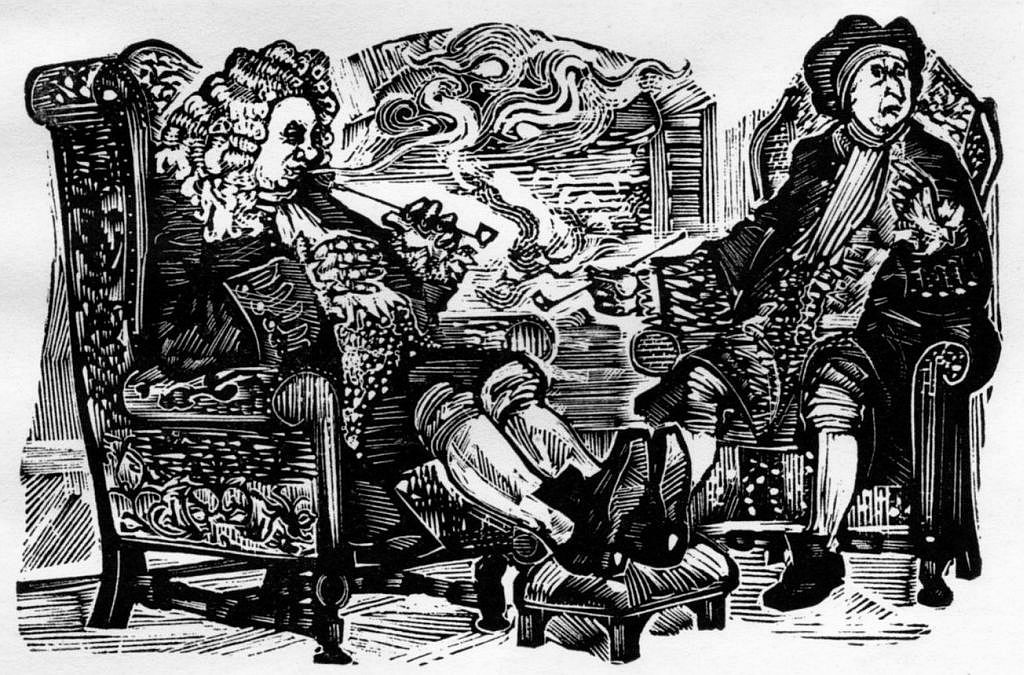
What can they be doing, brother? An illustration from the Folio Society edition of Tristram Shandy by Lawrence

He has illustrated more than 200 books, both adult and children's ranging from Shakespeare to Alan Ahlberg including the best-selling Watership Down by Richard Adams and has recently worked with Philip Pullman producing all the illustrations for Lyra's Oxford and Once Upon a Time in the North

His work is represented in the Ashmolean, the Victoria and Albert Museum, Manchester Metropolitan University and Seven Stories in Newcastle.
