= List of Jeopardy episodes =

Jeopardy is a British–Australian children's science fiction drama programme created by Tim O'Mara. It ran for three series, from 26 April 2002 to 11 May 2004, on BBC One. In total, 40 episodes of Jeopardy have aired.

== Series overview ==
| Series | Episodes | Originally released | |
| Series | Episodes | First released | Last released |
|---|---|---|---|
| 1 | 13 | 26 April 2002 | 19 July 2002 |
| 2 | 13 | 6 January 2003 | 31 March 2003 |
| 3 | 14 | 9 February 2004 | 11 May 2004 |

== Episodes ==
=== Series 1 (2002) ===
| No. overall | No. in series | Title | Directed by | Written by | Original release date |
|---|---|---|---|---|---|
| 1 | 1 | "Episode 1" | Paul Wroblewski | Tim O'Mara | 26 April 2002 |
The group set off for Australia after making their video introductions in Falkirk. In Australia they set up camp in the outback.
| 2 | 2 | "Episode 2" | Paul Wroblewski | Tim O'Mara | 3 May 2002 |
Sarah insists that she saw a UFO but no-one believes her. The group continues to settle into the camp.
| 3 | 3 | "Episode 3" | Paul Wroblewski | Lee Pressman | 10 May 2002 |
The group have a hard choice to make over how to save Leon after he is bitten by a deadly snake. Melissa makes the trek across the outback back to the truck to retrieve the anti-venom.
| 4 | 4 | "Episode 4" | Paul Wroblewski | Steven Turner | 17 May 2002 |
Melissa gets lost in the outback while Leon takes a turn for the worse.
| 5 | 5 | "Episode 5" | Paul Wroblewski | SJ Hallett | 24 May 2002 |
The boys set out into the outback to get Leon to safety. Back at camp Chrissy begins to freak out.
| 6 | 6 | "Episode 6" | Paul Wroblewski | Robyn Charteris | 31 May 2002 |
With Gerry missing, the boys continue their trek to the jeep, meanwhile Chrissy is delirious and runs off.
| 7 | 7 | "Episode 7" | Paul Wroblewski | Rachel Dawson | 7 June 2002 |
The boys are stuck in the bush, the jeep mysteriously disappeared, though Leon has survived after finding the anti-venom in a ring of stones. They return to base, where Simon and Chrissy hatch a plot to escape and abandon the group in an attempt to save themselves.
| 8 | 8 | "Episode 8" | Paul Wroblewski | Rachel Dawson | 14 June 2002 |
Chrissy follows Simon who has run away, claiming that he is following Gerry and Melissa. Meanwhile, the others find mysterious markings and a burned out crop circle in the ground.
| 9 | 9 | "Episode 9" | Paul Wroblewski | Robyn Charteris | 21 June 2002 |
Chrissy tries to convince Simon that he is delirious. Harry reveals that he has left his epilepsy medicine at home, and the camp is invaded by savage dingos.
| 10 | 10 | "Episode 10" | Paul Wroblewski | SJ Hallett | 28 June 2002 |
David gets angry at the group after his encounter with the apparent UFO. Shona finds a mysterious buried capsule. The group decide to abandon the camp and leave a note for Chrissy and Simon, should they return.
| 11 | 11 | "Episode 11" | Paul Wroblewski | Steven Turner | 5 July 2002 |
Chrissy and Simon find the camp, but due to his delusions, they both leave in search of the road. Simon finds Melissa tied up in a cave but abandons her, believing that he is hallucinating again. Chrissy and Simon find an old hut and find Gerry tied up inside.
| 12 | 12 | "Episode 12" | Paul Wroblewski | Unknown | 12 July 2002 |
Chrissy, Gerry and Simon are held captive by a mysterious man. The whole group is re-united and Joe, the man, is taken captive, which is uncalled for and unjustified. He reveals that the capsule contains diamonds.
| 13 | 13 | "Episode 13" | Paul Wroblewski | Tim O'Mara | 19 July 2002 |
Arnie (Peter Sumner) arrives to help save the group, but instead saves Joe (Jerome Ehlers) and runs off. The group radio the authorities and agree to meet them on Paramundi Ridge. Everyone thinks they're safe and want to go home, as a rescue helicopter approaches the light splits and a white mist descends, engulfing the group, when it clears they've gone, back home the newspaper headlines read: "Jeopardy Mystery of Missing UFO Kids".

=== Series 2 (2003) ===
| No. overall | No. in series | Title | Directed by | Written by | Original release date |
|---|---|---|---|---|---|
| 14 | 1 | "Episode 1" | Alan Macmillan | Tim O'Mara | 6 January 2003 |
The group are picked up by a helicopter and taken to a military center. However, they discover that their mobile phones are missing and they are constantly watched by CCTV cameras. However their fears are all dismissed by their liaison, Stanich. They soon discover that David and Sarah are missing and Mr. Simmons has been carted away, deemed insane.
| 15 | 2 | "Episode 2" | Alan Macmillan | SJ Hallett | 13 January 2003 |
As they realise that they are being tricked in the compound, the group plans to escape. But as they escape the compound, they realise that there is no one stopping them.
| 16 | 3 | "Episode 3" | Alan Macmillan | Robyn Charteris | 20 January 2003 |
While on the run, they look for supplies, encountering a strange boy, and find a crashed helicopter in the woods. They end up back at the compound, but find that it has been deserted, and some secret files with a list of recent disappearances.
| 17 | 4 | "Episode 4" | Alan Macmillan | Rachel Dawson | 27 January 2003 |
They contact a woman called Ed whose granddaughters also have links with Paramundi Ridge.
| 18 | 5 | "Episode 5" | Alan Macmillan | Steven Turner | 3 February 2003 |
Harry begins to suspect that there is a traitor in the group. With the help of Ed and Seb, they break into a military base in order to find out the fate of the rescue pilots.
| 19 | 6 | "Episode 6" | Alan Macmillan | Eddie Harrison and Richard Langridge | 10 February 2003 |
Chrissy is hit by a van and needs to go to hospital. The rest of the group choose to teach Simon a lesson after discovering that he was the spy.
| 20 | 7 | "Episode 7" | Tim O'Mara | Robyn Charteris | 17 February 2003 |
Simon is trapped on a train that is traveling across the country, while the rest of the group search for the twins.
| 21 | 8 | "Episode 8" | Tim O'Mara | Steve Turner | 24 February 2003 |
The group investigate the mysterious twins as Simon is rescued by a mysterious Aboriginal.
| 22 | 9 | "Episode 9" | Tim O'Mara | Lee Pressman | 3 March 2003 |
Stanich pursues the group as Vic shows Simon some ancient rock paintings portraying the group.
| 23 | 10 | "Episode 10" | Tim O'Mara | Rachel Dawson | 10 March 2003 |
The group abandons Rusty and takes a Toyota Landcruiser instead, Meanwhile Simon rushes to find the group as they travel to the Glass Mountains in a hope to reconnect with the aliens.
| 24 | 11 | "Episode 11" | Tim O'Mara | S.J. Hallett | 17 March 2003 |
Simon teams up with the twins, as the group search for Gerry who is locked up in a psychiatric hospital.
| 25 | 12 | "Episode 12" | Tim O'Mara | Robyn Charteris | 24 March 2003 |
Simon meets up with the group but not everyone is happy.
| 26 | 13 | "Episode 13" | Tim O'Mara | Tim O'Mara | 31 March 2003 |
The group go to the caves to look at the paintings. The group got caved in and Lucy runs for help, only to trip over and fall unconscious. When she comes to, she is met by Stanich's agents. Stanich helps them and agrees to get them to the Glass Mountains in time for the eclipse, their last chance to meet up with David and Sarah.

=== Series 3 (2004) ===
| No. overall | No. in series | Title | Directed by | Written by | Original release date |
|---|---|---|---|---|---|
| 27 | 1 | "Episode 1" | Paul Wroblewski | Stephen Hallett | 9 February 2004 |
The group finds themselves back in Falkirk. They split up, but find that there are very few people around. They find that everyone is at a memorial service for them.
| 28 | 2 | "Episode 2" | Paul Wroblewski | Rachel Dawson | 16 February 2004 |
Sarah and David are amazed to find that they are the only ones who can see the group. The group finally returns to Australia through the alien portal.
| 29 | 3 | "Episode 3" | Marcus DF White | Tim O'Mara | 23 February 2004 |
The group is back in Australia, with 3 days to stop their disappearance. The area is swarming with soldiers and Leon is sick.
| 30 | 4 | "Episode 4" | Marcus DF White | Steven Turner | 2 March 2004 |
With Leon missing, the group begins to fall into despair.
| 31 | 5 | "Episode 5" | Marcus DF White | Robyn Charteris | 9 March 2004 |
Shona meets Stanich, who claims to want to help her. Simon breaks into the hospital to look for Gerry. Shona's eye turns red and she disappears.
| 32 | 6 | "Episode 6" | Marcus DF White | James Mason | 16 March 2004 |
Stanich takes Harry and Lucy to Professor Sharpe, and admits that she knows about the 'red eye' virus. Simon discovers that Gerry may be being held on Astrid Island.
| 33 | 7 | "Episode 7" | Marcus DF White | Helen Eatock | 23 March 2004 |
Lucy tells Sharpe that she thinks red eye is caused by fear, while Simon and Chrissy hide out from strange noises.
| 34 | 8 | "Episode 8" | Marcus DF White | Rachel Dawson | 30 March 2004 |
Simon and Chrissie try to find Astrid Island. Chrissie saves Lucy from nearly being hit by a truck and her eye turns red and she disappears.
| 35 | 9 | "Episode 9" | Paul Wroblewski | Robyn Charteris | 6 April 2004 |
Lucy has been injured by the truck. Stanich tries to capture Lucy, Simon and Harry. Sharp reveals she has been trying to help them. Lucy's leg is badly bruised and an ambulance prepares to take them to the airport so they can go back to Scotland.
| 36 | 10 | "Episode 10" | Paul Wroblewski | Steven Turner | 13 April 2004 |
Gerry rescues the gang, and they search for Marronconba Island.
| 37 | 11 | "Episode 11" | Paul Wroblewski | Stephen Hallett | 20 April 2004 |
Gerry, Lucy, Simon and Harry are being held in an A.S.T.R.I.D. complex as captives. Simon's shirt gets caught on a nail and he hears Chrissie calling him, terrified, Simon's eye turns red and he disappears.
| 38 | 12 | "Episode 12" | Paul Wroblewski | Tim O'Mara | 27 April 2004 |
Gerry, Lucy and Harry try to blend in on Astrid Island. They discover that their friends have been given the mental ability of children.
| 39 | 13 | "Episode 13" | Paul Wroblewski | Helen Eatock | 4 May 2004 |
With Gerry infected with the red eye virus, Harry and Lucy must try to escape the island.
| 40 | 14 | "Episode 14" | Paul Wroblewski | James Mason | 11 May 2004 |
Harry and Lucy meet the aliens. They are sent back in time to stop the trip from ever occurring. When they arrive back in Falkirk, Harry and Lucy run to the Ufology Club to warn themselves not to go. Three alternate endings for the episode were conceived, and to date, the "spooky" and "happy" endings have been aired.
