= Stephen Whittaker =

British actor and director

- In The Web of Fear (1968)
- Born: Stephen John Whittaker; 28 June 1947; London, England, United Kingdom
- Died: 7 February 2003 (aged 55); London, England
- Occupations: Actor and director
- Years active: 1966-2003
- Spouse(s): Wife, Ann.
- Children: A son and daughter

Stephen Whittaker (28 June 1947 – 7 February 2003) was a British actor and director. He worked largely in British film and television, and attended Henley-in-Arden School in Warwickshire before further training as an actor at London's Corona Academy. He began his career aged 17, as a "bad boy" in the film To Sir With Love (1966), and in the classic BBC Doctor Who adventure The Web of Fear, as a soldier battling Yeti in the London Underground.

In 1985 Whittaker took a director's training course, and directed a short training film which he sent to John Schlesinger (who had directed him in Yanks). Schlesinger suggested him to producer Mark Shivas as director for Channel 4's drama trilogy What If It's Raining, written by Anthony Minghella. This was the beginning of a directing career of prestigious TV and film work. Shortly before Whittaker's death, writer Julian Fellowes spoke of him as, "the most exciting director in the industry."

In 2001 he filmed his final project The Rocket Post, a romantic drama set on a remote Scottish island. The film had severe funding problems, and was eventually released in 2006, three years after his death. The credits bear a dedication to his memory. Whittaker died following complications from a routine surgery.

== Director ==
- What If It's Raining (1986) (TV)
- Eurocops: Hunting the Squirrel (1988) (TV), crime drama written by Billy Hamon, starring John Benfield
- Portrait of a Marriage (1990) (TV)
- Agatha Christie's Poirot (1 episode, 1992) - "Death in the Clouds" (1992) TV episode
- Inspector Morse (1 episode, 1993) - "The Day of the Devil" (1993) TV episode
- Closing Numbers (1993)
- Killing Me Softly (1995) (TV)
- Hearts and Minds (1995) (TV)
- Stone Cold (1997) Producer Andy Rowley BBC Scene
- Tangier Cop (1997) ... a.k.a. Heartbreak City
- Stone, Scissors, Paper (1997) (TV)
- A Life for a Life (1998) (TV)
- Grafters (1998) TV mini-series (unknown episodes)
- Grafters II (1999) TV mini-series
- Dalziel and Pascoe (1 episode, 2000) - "A Sweeter Lazarus" (2000) TV episode producer Andy Rowley
- The Life and Adventures of Nicholas Nickleby (2001) (TV)
- Sons and Lovers (2003) (TV)
- The Rocket Post (2004)

== Actor ==
- Out of the Unknown (1966, 1 episode) .... Harold
- To Sir, with Love (1967) .... Schoolboy
- Doctor Who (1968, episode: The Web of Fear) .... Craftsman Weams
- Up the Junction (1968) .... Alf (uncredited)
- Chastity (1969) .... Eddie
- Strange Report (1969, 1 episode) .... The Office Boy
- Bury Me an Angel (1972) .... Killer (as Stephen Wittaker)
- I Escaped from Devil's Island (1973) .... Leper Count
- Dinosaur (1975)
- The Great Gundown (1977) .... Laredo
- Yanks (1979) .... Merchant seaman
- The Keep (1983) .... S.S. Commando
- Blott on the Landscape (1985, 1 episode) .... Orderly (final appearance)
