= Once Upon a Time in the North (disambiguation) =

Once Upon a Time in the North is a 2008 fantasy novella by Philip Pullman.

Once Upon a Time in the North may also refer to:

- Once Upon a Time in the North (TV series), a 1994 British sitcom starring Bernard Hill
- Once Upon a Time in the North (album), a 2003 album by moi Caprice
- Once Upon a Time in the North (Immortal Souls album), a 2005 album by Immortal Souls
- Once Upon a Time in the North (film) (Härmä), a 2012 Finnish film
