= Aldus =

Aldus may refer to:

== People ==
- Aldus Manutius, a Venetian publisher who popularized small personal volumes
- Aldus Manutius the Younger, grandson of Aldus Manutius
- Aldus Chapin Higgins (1872–1948), American lawyer and inventor
- Aldus Roger (1915–1999), American Cajun accordion player
- David Aldus (born 1941), Welsh painter

== Businesses ==
- Aldine Press, the printing office founded by Aldus Manutius
- Aldus Corporation, a software developer known for their desktop publishing software that was acquired by Adobe Inc.

== Other ==
- Aldus (typeface), a Palatino-family typeface by Herman Zapf

== See also ==
- In typography, some forms of fleuron are also known as an "aldus leaf"

' Aldous (disambiguation)
