= Alfred Pullman =

British soldier and airman

Alfred Outram Pullman DFC (21 May 1916 – 6 February 1954) was a British soldier and airman who fought in the Second World War and the Mau Mau Uprising. He was awarded the Distinguished Flying Cross (DFC) for gallant service after being killed in an air crash in Kenya.

== Early life ==
Pullman was the only son of Major Alfred Hopewell Pullman, of the Royal West Kent Regiment, and his wife Emilie Louisa Outram, daughter of Rev. Outram Marshall. His parents were married in June 1915, during the First World War. His father, born in 1881, was the third son of Henry Pullman JP of Teddington, and had received the Queen's South Africa Medal with five clasps for service in the Boer War. In 1915 he was awarded the Distinguished Service Order, for service at the Battle of Loos.

Pullman was born in May 1916 and baptized at St Paul's, Woking, on 10 June 1916. His father died in 1942. The young Pullman was educated at Cheltenham College and then trained at the Royal Military College, Sandhurst, for a career in the British Army, graduating on 30 January 1936, aged nineteen.

== Career ==
Immediately after Sandhurst, in January 1936, Pullman was commissioned as a 2nd Lieutenant into the Middlesex Regiment. In October 1939, he was living in Esher with his mother and was a General Aircraft Student. In February 1942, he was appointed as a probationary Pilot Officer in the Royal Air Force Volunteer Reserve, in November 1947 was promoted to Flying Officer, and then in January 1951 to Flight Lieutenant. He next attended the Central Flying School at RAF Little Rissington, which had the purpose of training flying instructors, and on 7 August 1951 passed out as a Qualified Service Pilot.

In 1952, Pullman was posted to Rhodesia, in support of the Southern Rhodesian Air Force, and took his wife and children to live there with him. On 27 March 1953, he was transferred from the short service list onto the permanent commission list, and four days later was posted with No 1340 Flight of Harvards to Kenya, on active service during the Mau Mau Uprising. He led the flight in aerial attacks on Mau Mau bases in wooded country, sometimes "diving steeply into the gorges of the Mathioya, Chania, Gura, and Zuti rivers, often in conditions of low cloud and driving rain". He showed an offensive spirit and was determined in making attacks. On 6 February 1954, Pullman was killed when his plane crashed, and his wife and children, at home in Rhodesia, were informed by telegram. His remains were buried in Kenya at Nyeri. On 29 June 1954 Pullman was posthumously awarded the Distinguished Flying Cross, "in recognition of gallant and distinguished service in operations in Kenya". He had completed a total of 3,040 flying hours, including 220 sorties for bombing and strafing. His widow and two young sons attended an investiture at Buckingham Palace.

== Private life ==
On 7 April 1945, at St Andrew's, Kirby Bedon, Norfolk, Pullman married Audrey Evelyn Merrifield, a WAAF Officer, the daughter of the Rev. Sidney Merrifield, Rector of the parish. Their son Philip was born in October 1946, and a second son, Francis, in 1949.

In October 1954, after her husband's death, Audrey Pullman married Henry J. Dodgson, known as Johnnie, another Royal Air Force pilot. After Audrey's death in 1989, papers came to light which suggested that at the time of Pullman's death in 1954 he and his wife had separated and were seeking a divorce.

== Later criticism ==
Pullman's son Philip became a fantasy novelist, and in 2008 he commented on his father "I have never fully understood why he got the medal. As far as I can make out, it was an accident. His plane crashed... Given what we now know about British behaviour during the insurgency, my father probably doesn't come out of this with very much credit, judged by the standards of modern liberal progressive thought." He has also claimed that his father had gambling debts and might have killed himself, and also that he suspected the death had been faked and that his father was "alive somewhere in hiding with a different name".
