= Bodley Medal =

Bodleian Library award

Obverse

Reverse

The Bodley Medal is awarded by the Bodleian Library at Oxford University to individuals who have made "outstanding contributions ... to the worlds of communications and literature" and who have helped the library achieve "the vision of its founder, Sir Thomas Bodley, to be a library not just to Oxford University but also to the world".

== Description of the Medal ==
The medal's obverse shows the right profile of Thomas Bodley and bears the Latin inscription "TH BODLY EQ AVR PVBL BIBLIOTH OXON FVNDATOR", which translates "Sir Thomas Bodley, Founder of the Public Library at Oxford". The reverse reads "R P LITERARIAE AETERNITAS", which means "The Eternity of the Republic of Letters". It shows a female figure, probably representing the Republic of Letters, bearing a head in each hand. The medal is signed "Warin" on the obverse.

== History ==
The original medal was engraved in 1646 to honour Sir Thomas Bodley, who rebuilt the first public library at Oxford in 1602, now called the Bodleian Library. It was designed by Claude Warin, a leading medal maker of the 17th century. Library accounts for 1646 contain the following entry: "Item, to ye painter that drew Sir Thomas Bodley's picture, and to Mr. Warren that made his medale, to each of them 2s". The original medal is gilt, probably on bronze. In 2002, on the 400th anniversary of the Bodleian Library, the copper metal saved from a renovation of the library's original roof was given to the Royal Mint to create a set of one hundred replicas of the original medal. After a hiatus of nearly 400 years, the library started granting awards of the Bodley Medal, beginning with Sir Tim Berners-Lee (inventor of the World Wide Web), Baroness P.D. James (author), and Rupert Murdoch (Chairman of News Corporation). The award is made as part of the annual Oxford Literary Festival.

== Laureates ==
As of 2024, the restruck Bodley Medal has been awarded to 34 individuals.

Eminent Laureates of the Bodley Medal
Year	Name
2024	Sir Philip Pullman (novelist); Ali Smith (novelist)
2023	Colm Tóibín (novelist)
2022	Robert Caro (biographer and historian); Zadie Smith (novelist)
2020	Pat Barker (novelist)
2019	Amartya Sen (economist and philosopher); Sir Kazuo Ishiguro (novelist)
2018	Claire Tomalin (biographer and journalist)
2017	William Boyd (novelist and screenwriter)
2016	Professor Mary Beard, (classicist); Dame Maggie Smith (actress); Christopher Tolkien (book editor)
2015	Sir David Attenborough (naturalist); Stephen Hawking (theoretical physicist); Jim Eyre (architect); Sir Nicholas Hytner (theatre and film director)
2014	Ian McEwan (author)
2013	Hilary Mantel (author)
2012	Peter Carey (author)
2008	Alan Bennett (author and actor)
2005	Carl Pforzheimer III (businessman and philanthropist); Helmut Friedlaender (businessman and philanthropist); William Scheide (scholar)
2004	Lord Richard Attenborough (film director); Professor Seamus Heaney (poet); Sir Thomas Stoppard (playwright and screenwriter)
2003	Pat Mitchell (president & CEO of Public Broadcasting Service); Dr. Oliver Sacks (physician and writer); Dr. John Warnock (co-founder of Adobe Systems)
2002	Sir Tim Berners-Lee (inventor of the World Wide Web); Baroness P. D. James (novelist); Rupert Murdoch (chairman of News Corporation)

== See also ==
- Oxford Literary Festival
