= Aldous =

Aldous (/ˈɔːldəs/ AWL-dəs) is both a surname and a given name. Notable people with the name include:

== Surname ==
- David Aldous (actor), English actor and broadcaster
- David Aldous, British-American mathematician
- David Aldous, stock car driver; see List of 2008 motorsport champions
- Georgie Aldous (born 1998), British social activist, model and influencer
- J. E. P. Aldous, Canadian composer
- Lucette Aldous, Australian ballerina
- Montague Aldous, Canadian surveyor of the Northwest Territories
- Peter Aldous (born 1961), British politician
- Robert Aldous, English actor
- William Aldous, English judge and arbitrator

== Given name ==
- Aldous Harding (born 1990), New Zealand folk musician
- Aldous Huxley (1894–1963), English writer and philosopher

== Fictional ==
- Aldous, a character in Mobile Legends in which he is a Fighter

== See also ==
- Aldus (disambiguation)
- Aldous (disambiguation)
