= Scene (TV series) =

British anthology television series

Scene is a British television anthology drama/documentary series made by the BBC for teenagers, broadcast from 1968 to 2002. It comprised dramas and documentaries on topical issues, sometimes of a controversial nature, by leading contemporary playwrights including Willy Russell, Fay Weldon, Tom Stoppard, Alan Plater etc. Programmes were originally broadcast to a school audience as part of the BBC Schools strand. Dramas from the series were also regularly broadcast for a wider adult audience.

Scene was originally conceived as a series of thirty minute dramas and documentaries suitable for showing to teenage schoolchildren as part of the English and Humanities curriculum. It was envisaged that the dramas shown would stimulate discussion in the classroom about various contemporary issues relevant to teenagers (such as race, drugs, sex, disability etc.).

== Award winners and nominees ==
- Terry (1969) – BAFTA Flame of Knowledge Award.
- A Collier's Friday Night (1976) – BAFTA Flame of Knowledge Award.
- Loved Up (1996) – BAFTA for best schools drama. Series Ass.Producer Andy Rowley
- Alison (1996) – BAFTA nomination for best schools drama. Series Producer Andy Rowley
- United (1998) – BAFTA for best schools drama. Produced and directed by Michael McGowan.
- Junk (1999) – BAFTA for best schools drama.
- Offside (2002) – BAFTA for best schools drama.
- Split game (2005) – BAFTA nomination for best schools drama.
- Stone Cold BAFTA nomination 1998 Producer Andy Rowley Director Stephen Whittaker

== Selected episodes ==
Terraces (1993). The residents of a street of terraced houses decide to paint them all in the colours of their local football team – all except one man who refuses to conform to mob rule. Written by Willy Russell.

Loved Up (1995). A young woman leaves home to live with her boyfriend and discovers the rave scene and ecstasy. Series producer Andy Rowley. A 2 x 30 minute abridged version of a BAFTA-winning drama.

Alison (1996): BAFTA-nominated Comedy-drama. Terry Kennett decides to return to his home town after a ten-year absence. He bumps into old mates and his former girlfriend Alison who shows him around their old haunts. They reminisce about their teenage romance, first sexual experience and the reasons for their eventual breakup. Terry is shocked to find that Alison is now a young single mother, but decides to rekindle their relationship in the hope that former mistakes are behind them. Written and directed by Al Hunter Ashton and produced by Andy Rowley. Starring Sarah Jane Potts and Jack Deam.

Teaching Matthew written by Al Hunter Ashton. A satire on Willy Russell's Educating Rita. Ashton acted in the film, playing Sergeant Conway. Adrian Lester played the eponymous lead character.

Stone Cold (1997) Starring Peter Howitt. Threat to runaway boy Link who becomes homeless after abuse at home and is prey to a street killer. Directed by Stephen Whittaker and produced by Andy Rowley. BAFTA nominated

Junk (1999): Bafta-winning drama. Following difficulties with her parents, teenager Gemma Brogan leaves home. She falls under the spell of a young woman who introduces her to the world of alternative youth culture and drugs. Initially her new life seems glamorous and exciting but she soon discovers its dark side as she slides uncontrollably into heroin addiction. Starring Jemima Rooper.

== Reception and legacy ==
Critical reaction was positive with praise for the high production standards. The series was nominated for five awards in 1996–1997 and won a Prix Jeunesse in 1998 under series producer Andy Rowley Some of the actors featured in Scene went on to achieve varying degrees of mainstream success. e.g.: Jemima Rooper (Junk, 1999), Sarah Jane Potts, Jack Deam, Lucy Davis (Alison, 1996), Adrian Lester (Teaching Matthew, 1993), Sean Maguire (A Man of Letters, 1997), Peter Howitt (Stone Cold).
