= Craig-James Moncur =

Scottish actor and producer

Craig-James Moncur is a Scottish actor and producer best known for his role as Harry Hastings in the BAFTA Award winning CBBC Series Jeopardy, as well as roles in Monarch of the Glen, Inspector Rebus, How Not to Live Your Life and appearing in the film Land of Sunshine.

Recent productions include "The Banker" which has received viral status and over 360,000 YouTube views and premiered at the 2011 Myrtle Beach International Film Festival. Producer of "Choices" a film for the British criminal justice system and premiered at the 2011 Edinburgh International Film Festival. Craig is now Writing and Directing through his company Black Box Digital Media and recently completed work on his first feature film Skeletons. Craig was tipped as "One to Watch" in 2014 by The Scotsman newspaper.
