= The Broken Bridge =

1990 novel by Philip Pullman

- First edition (publ. Macmillan)
- Author: Philip Pullman
- Language: English
- Genre: Fiction
- Publisher: Macmillan Publishers
- Publication date: 1990
- Publication place: United Kingdom
- Media type: Print
- Pages: 176 p.
- ISBN: 9780330322270
- OCLC: 978706527

The Broken Bridge is a 1990 young adult novel by Philip Pullman. Set in Wales around Cardigan Bay, it tells the story of Ginny Howard, a young mixed-race girl, an aspiring artist, who discovers she has a half-brother and that her mother may still be alive.
