= Once Upon a Time in the North =

2008 novel by Philip Pullman

- Cover
- Author: Philip Pullman
- Cover artist: John Lawrence
- Language: English
- Genre: Fantasy / Western short story
- Publisher: David Fickling Books, Alfred A. Knopf Books for Young Readers
- Publication date: United Kingdom: 3 April 2008; United States: 22 April 2008; Australia: 1 May 2008
- Publication place: United Kingdom
- Media type: Print (Hardback)
- Pages: 104
- ISBN: 978-0-385-61432-0

Once Upon a Time in the North is a 2008 novella by Philip Pullman. The book serves as a prequel to Pullman's His Dark Materials trilogy. The premise of the story involves the meeting of Iorek Byrnison and Lee Scoresby:

I've just finished a short book which will be coming out next spring, probably March or April in this country. It's called Once Upon A Time in the North, and it's about Lee and Iorek. When we see them for the first time with Lyra, Lee is not that old; he's fifty, sixty, something like that, so they know each other for a long time. But I wanted to write a story when they first met as they were young, and I've just written it. I'm making a little book like Lyra's Oxford.

— Philip Pullman

The Guardian carried an "exclusive" extract from the book under the heading Winds of Chance on 22 March 2008.

The book launch took place on 31 March in Oxford during the Oxford Literary Festival.

== Plot ==
Lee Scoresby, a 24-year-old Texan aeronaut, and his dæmon, the jackrabbit Hester, make a rough landing in Novy Odense, a harbour town on an island in the White Sea, in Muscovy. After paying for the storage of their balloon, Lee and Hester make their way into town, where Lee notes with surprise the presence of bears: some working, some just loitering about. He enters a bar to get something to eat and drink, and falls into conversation with a local journalist, Oskar Siggurdson, who explains that an election for Mayor of Novy Odense will take place later in the week. Siggurdson tells Lee that the overwhelming favourite — not the incumbent mayor, but a man called Ivan Dimitrovich Poliakov — has as a central policy a campaign to deal with the bears that hang around the town. Oskar mentions that the bears, once a proud race, now rank as "worthless vagrants". Lee learns with amazement that these bears are intelligent, can speak, and make and wear their own armour, though laws make it illegal for the bears to wear their armour in Novy Odense. At this point, Lee intervenes in a conflict elsewhere in the bar, preventing the barkeeper from beating a drunk Dutch captain called van Breda, who has a ship tied up in the harbour but does not have permission to load his cargo and leave. Lee and van Breda get thrown out of the bar.

Lee finds lodgings at a boarding-house and meets some of the fellow-guests over the evening meal: a young librarian called Miss Lund, a photographer, and an economist called Mikhail Ivanovich Vassiliev. Lee and Vassiliev attend a meeting at the town hall organised by the mayoral candidate Poliakov. Armed men in purple uniforms patrol the meeting: Lee takes them for customs officers. Vassiliev corrects him, explaining that they are security men from Larsen Manganese, a large mining company that are in league with Poliakov. Vassiliev mentions that they have a large gun they are looking to use in a riot situation, but their conversation is interrupted when Lee runs into Siggurdson. Siggurdson introduces him to Olga Poliakova, Poliakov's daughter. While he is initially attracted to her, Lee is put off by her lack of intelligence. Lee falls asleep and therefore misses Poliakov's speech, but once it is over Siggurdson insists on introducing Lee to the politician. Poliakov offers to employ Lee as a mercenary, to help him take care of a situation at the harbour. Lee is about to agree when he spots another of Poliakov's associates, a man Poliakov introduces as Pierre Morton. Lee recognises the man, whom he met using the name Pierre McConville. Lee met McConville while working for a rancher called Lloyd, who got into a boundary dispute with a neighbour. This neighbour hired McConville to kill Lloyd's men one by one, including Lloyd's nephew, Jimmy Partlett, who was shot dead in front of a number of witnesses. Only one of these witnesses was willing to tell the truth in court, and when McConville was acquitted by a corrupt jury he shot the witness dead in the street and rode out of town. He was rearrested and sent to the capital of the province with an armed escort but vanished en route. Recognising Morton as this enemy from his past, Lee turns down Poliakov's offer of employment and leaves.

In the middle of the night, back at the boarding-house, Lee hears Miss Lund crying and asks the cause. Miss Lund cryptically asks for his advice on a matter of honour. Lee gives his advice as well as he can understand the situation, to Miss Lund's gratitude. Lee returns to his bed baffled about what has just happened, but Hester berates him, saying that Miss Lund has obviously received a proposal of marriage, and Lee advised her to accept. At breakfast the next morning, Vassiliev explains that Miss Lund has a sweetheart in the Customs Office. During their conversation, Lee realises that the situation that Poliakov wanted him to deal with is most likely connected to Captain van Breda. Lee heads down to the harbour to investigate. He runs into van Breda again, who has still not been allowed to load his cargo. The two men head to a bar for a drink. Lee learns that van Breda's cargo, mining equipment and rock samples, is being held on a legal technicality and will be impounded and sold at auction unless he loads it by the next day. Unfortunately, van Breda is being prevented from loading his cargo. The captain insists that Poliakov is waiting for his cargo to be impounded and will then buy it at a low price at auction. Lee, disgusted by Poliakov's behaviour, offers to help break into the warehouse and stand guard while van Breda loads his cargo. Van Breda gratefully accepts, and the two head for the harbour. On the pavement outside the bar, Lee is waylaid by one of the bears, who introduces himself as Iorek Byrnison. Iorek also offers to help van Breda, to get back at Poliakov. Iorek puts on the only piece of armour he currently has – a battered helmet – and the group set off, attracting a large crowd of onlookers as they near the harbour.

Talking his way past the Harbour Master, Lee stands off against a group of men guarding the warehouse. Lee shoots one of them in the hip, knocking him into the water. The other men pull him out and then scatter. At that point the Larsen Manganese men deploy the riot gun mentioned by Vassilev earlier, but before they can do anything with it Iorek overturns it and pushes it into the harbour. With Iorek's help, Lee breaks into the warehouse. Van Breda gives him the Winchester rifle kept on-board his boat, and Lee heads up the floors to deal with the two gunmen positioned up there. He shoots the first in the shoulder and gets into a firefight with the second. The wounded man tries to strangle Hester, but Lee shoots him dead. The remaining gunman turns out to be Morton, who manages to shoot Lee in the shoulder and ear. Taunting him with the story of how he killed his armed escorts – by tying one of them to the ground, binding his daemon to a horse and forcing the two apart to an unbearable distance, causing the man to die an agonising death – Morton moves in for the kill, his snake daemon advancing ahead of him. Hester pounces on Morton's daemon and drags it towards Lee, forcing Morton to come stumbling out of his hiding place in pain. Lee shoots him in the chest, declares this revenge for what happened to Jimmy Partlett, and then shoots him dead.

Outside, Larsen Manganese security men led by Poliakov have surrounded the warehouse. Before they can do anything, a group of Customs officers led by Lieutenant Haugland arrive, disperse the soldiers and crowd, and arrest Lee. Van Breda leaves with his ship and cargo, insisting that Lee keep the rifle as a token of thanks. It emerges that this is the same rifle Lee has when he is killed in his final gunfight, thirty-five years later. Haugland takes Lee back to the depot where his balloon is stored. On the way, he explains that there is little the Customs board will be able to do to punish Poliakov, but they are still grateful to Lee for acting as he did. His balloon has been provisioned and made ready for departure, with all his belongings brought from the boarding house. Iorek arrives, and tends to Lee's wounds using bloodmoss. Lee has lost part of his ear. Oskar Siggurdson also arrives, but Lee pushes him into the harbour rather than giving an interview. Lee prepares to leave, thanking Haugland for his help. Haugland says that he should thank Miss Lund, who has just agreed to become his fiancée. Vassiliev comes running into the depot, warning them that Larsen Manganese men are on the way with orders to kill Lee and Iorek. Lee suggests the bear should escape with him on his balloon, and the armoured bear agrees, saying that the aeronaut is obviously a man of the Arctic. When Lee asks what he means, Iorek points to his daemon as an Arctic hare, much to Hester and Lee's surprise. The balloon then leaves and Lee, Hester, and Iorek fly away together. The book ends with Lee remarking that he was amazed to learn Hester is a hare, to which she replies, "I always knew I had more class than a rabbit."

== Extras ==
As well as the main story, the limited edition of the book also contains a few extras. These include:

- A board game called Peril of the Pole, mentioned in the story.
- A newspaper article written by Oskar Siggurdson that offers a different spin on the events. It describes Lee and Iorek as villains and mentions that the incidents in Novy Odense merely serve to reinforce Ivan Dimitrovich Poliakov's belief as to the dangers of the bears.
- Two pages from The Elements of Aerial Navigation, a book that Lee won with the balloon and which he uses to help him fly. Lee only has the first half of the book.
- A page from a book called The Shipping World Year Book, which includes an entry about Novy Odense.
- Two letters written by Lyra Silvertongue from [St Sophia's College, Oxford. She addresses one to Tom, the other to a Dr. Polstead: both concern Lyra's dissertation for her MPhil in Economic History. Her dissertation has (one version) the title "Developments of patterns of trade in the European Arctic region with particular reference to independent balloon carriage (1950–1970)". In the first letter Lyra also mentions that she continues to study the alethiometer.
- The certificate for submission of Lyra's dissertation.

== Audiobook ==
The publishers earmarked an audiobook version of the novella for release on the same day as the print version. Philip Pullman and a full cast perform, with Garrick Hagan as producer.

== Reception ==
Reviews of the book began to appear a little under two weeks before the UK publication. The Times described it as "a joy"; while Ian Giles judged the book an "absolute triumph".
