= The Scarecrow and his Servant =

2004 children's novel by Philip Pullman

- First edition cover
- Author: Philip Pullman
- Language: English
- Genre: Children's, Fantasy
- Publisher: Doubleday
- Publication date: 4 November 2004
- Publication place: United Kingdom
- Pages: 230
- ISBN: 978-0-385-40980-3
- OCLC: 57692822

The Scarecrow and his Servant is a 2004 children's novel by Philip Pullman. It tells the story of a scarecrow who comes alive after being struck by lightning and sets out on a quest with Jack, an orphan he hires as his servant. As he goes on his quest he tries to reach Spring Valley to claim it for his own. He has many troubles along the way such as a bird who ate his brain and being on a deserted island.

It won the Nestlé Smarties Book Prize Silver Award in 2005, as well as being shortlisted for the 2004 Carnegie Medal. According to the author's website, the book was planned to be adapted by BAFTA winning writer Danny Brocklehurst for Aardman.

== Plot ==
Old Mr. Pandolfo makes a scarecrow, puts a letter in his jacket pocket and puts it in the cornfield. One night, lightning strikes the scarecrow and it comes to life. Not far from there, a boy called Jack was wandering around, looking for food. He sees the scarecrow and helps him out of his trap. The elegant straw doll offers Jack a job as his personal servant. The boy accepts and they set off on an adventure. The scarecrow tells Jack that he has an estate called Spring Valley. The two decide to go to the estate, but they will have to face the Buffaloni, Pandolfo's cousins. Will they succeed?
