= Gordon McCorkell =

Scottish actor (born 1983)

- Born: Gordon McCorkell; 1983 (age 42–43); Barrhead, Renfrewshire, Scotland

Gordon McCorkell (born 1983) is a Scottish actor who is best known for the role of Derek "Deek" Henderson in River City from 2002 to 2012. He has also appeared in the Ford Kiernan and Greg Hemphill productions, Chewin' the Fat and as Winston's grandson Joe the boxer in the pilot episode of Still Game. He was a member of PACE Youth Theatre until 2002 but still is involved in activities. He also appeared as David in the BAFTA Award-winning children's drama Jeopardy (2002–2004).

In June 2016, McCorkell was recognised by Glasgow's International Financial Services District for achieving top marks in his final exams.

McCorkell was nominated for the award by Glasgow Kelvin College for his 'A' grade achieved on the HND Accountancy course.
