= Chris Jury =

English actor, writer and director

- Born: 28 September 1956 (age 69); Coventry, Warwickshire, England
- Occupations: Actor, writer and director
- Years active: 1979 to present

Chris Jury (born 28 September 1956) is an English actor, writer and director with a range of television credits. He is best known for his role as Eric Catchpole in the BBC television series Lovejoy, which he played between 1986 (series 1) and 1993 (series 5), with a brief return in 1994 (series 6), for the show's finale.

Jury studied Drama/English at Hull University and began working as an actor in the theatre with such names as Mike Bradwell, Danny Boyle and Anthony Minghella, and with companies as diverse as Hull Truck, the Bush and Stratford East.

Having made his name in Lovejoy, Jury was a strong contender to play the Seventh Doctor in Doctor Who in 1987, a role which was ultimately cast with Sylvester McCoy. A year later, Jury appeared as a guest star in the story The Greatest Show in the Galaxy.

Through his own company, Picture That, in 1993 he produced and directed To Baldly Go, a short romantic comedy which was sold to Channel 4 in the UK, and also secured an international distribution contract, selling to numerous TV stations throughout Europe and the USA. After a brief spell working in drama script development at BBC Pebble Mill, in Birmingham, in 1996 he made two more short films for Picture That: Poppy's Present, which he produced and directed, and Puke Fiction (The Vomit Trilogy), which he wrote and directed.

Puke Fiction was shown in competition at the Ritzy Cinema in Brixton and won the Electric Pavilion Award, for Best Film, awarded by the Halloween Society. It was also chosen for a screening at the ICA as part of the 'Uncut' season of short films and was also shown in the 'British Shorts' section of the Manchester Film Festival and the Big Fix Festival in Birmingham.

His broadcast directing credits include Dream Team, Coronation Street, Crossroads, Family Affairs and over 40 episodes of EastEnders. His writing credits include, The Dig, a two act comedy for the Cambridge Theatre Company, Mancini's Empire, One Inch of Heaven, Roeg's Rage, Wired, plus numerous episodes of The Bill and Doctors, Casualty and Holby City. He also appeared as teacher Mr Knowles in Grange Hill. In 2006 he moved into writing feature films including Human Resources.

He has lectured on scriptwriting and Film & TV production at the University Of West London, Leeds Metropolitan University, Bath Spa University, Ruskin College Oxford, University Of The Creative Arts.

He has been a trade unionist for over 40 years and a member of Equity, the Directors Guild of Great Britain (DGGB), Directors UK, University and College Union (UCU) and the Writers' Guild (WGGB). He was founding Chair of the Midlands TUC Creative & Leisure Industries Committee retiring in 2018. Before retiring he had been a member of the National Exec and Chair of the TV Committee of the DGGB, Branch Chair and South West Regional Executive Communications Officer of UCU, and a member of the TV Committee of the WGGB.

== Selected filmography ==
Year	Title	Role	Notes
1983	Jonny Jarvis	Benny	2 episodes
1983 - 1984	Grange Hill	Mr. Knowles	7 episodes
1984	Play for Today	Baz	Series 14, Episode 6: "No Hard Feelings"
1986	Dramarama	Rawlings	Series 4, Episode 10: "Just a Game"
1986	What If It's Raining	Chris	2 episodes
1986 - 1994	Lovejoy	Eric Catchpole	55 episodes
1988	A Very Peculiar Practice	Peter Wagstaff	Series 2, Episode 3: "May the Force Be With You"
1988 - 1989	Doctor Who: The Greatest Show in the Galaxy	Deadbeat	3 episodes
1989	Casualty	DC Monahan	Series 4, Episode 4: "Day Off"
1989	Stay Lucky	Kevin	3 episodes
1990	Perfect Scoundrels	Harvey Trotter	Series 1, Episode 3: "The Milk of Human Kindness"
1991	Screen One	Festival Steward	Series 2, Episode 10: "Happy Feet"
1994	Casualty	Mr. Skinner	Series 9, Episode 7: "A Breed Apart"
1994	Heartbeat	PC Normal Little	Series 4, Episode 6: "Nice Girls Don't"
1995	The Big Game	Walter	TV Movie
1997	Noah's Ark	Nicky Baldwin	4 episodes
1998	Wycliffe	Toby Penwarren	Series 5, Episode 4: "Feeding the Rat"
1999	Starting Out	Louie	9 episodes
2009	A Season of Misfits	Jonathan	
2010	The Exam	Sam	Short film
2017	Holby City	Richard Cuthbert	Series 19, Episode 22: "Other People's Dreams"
2023	Buckle Up	Governor, Timothy Oxford	
