= What If It's Raining =

- Genre: Drama
- Written by: Anthony Minghella
- Directed by: Stephen Whittaker
- Starring: Michael Maloney; Miles Anderson; Deborah Findlay; Eve Matheson; Chris Jury; Jane Gurnett; Kamilla Blanche
- Composer: Barrington Pheloung
- Country of origin: United Kingdom
- Original language: English
- No. of series: 1
- No. of episodes: 3

Production
- Producer: Mark Shivas
- Production locations: Bristol, England, UK
- Running time: 60 minutes
- Production companies: Channel Four Films; Limehouse Productions

Original release
- Network: Channel 4
- Release: 3 July – 17 July 1986

What If It's Raining is a three-part British television drama miniseries, written by Anthony Minghella and directed by Stephen Whittaker, first broadcast on Channel 4 on 3 July 1986. The series is set in Bristol and explored the emotional and psychological pressures that lead to separation and divorce through the intertwined lives of different couples. The series was divided into three 50-minute episodes, with each focusing heavily on a specific character's perspective on their failing relationships.

The series initially broadcast at 9:30pm on Thursdays for three consecutive weeks between 3 and 17 July 1986, although was later re-edited from three episodes into one hour and fifty minute feature-length film and rebroadcast on Tuesday 2 December later this year.

== Cast ==
- Michael Maloney as Dominic
- Miles Anderson as Philip
- Deborah Findlay as Marilyn
- Eve Matheson as Siobhan
- Chris Jury as Chris
- Jane Gurnett as Stephanie
- Kamilla Blanche as Angie

== Episodes ==
No.	Title	Directed by	Written by	Original release date
1	"Episode 1"	Stephen Whittaker	Anthony Minghella	3 July 1986
Dominic (Michael Maloney) and Marilyn (Deborah Findlay) are married but estranged, both doting on their young baby but involved in extramarital affairs.
2	"Episode 2"	Stephen Whittaker	Anthony Minghella	10 July 1986
Marilyn has left Dominic and gone to stay in Bristol with Philip (Miles Anderson), taking the baby with her. Dominic spends his first weekend alone with Jack (Jack Bentall), and they meet a fascinating woman.
3	"Episode 3"	Stephen Whittaker	Anthony Minghella	17 July 1986
There are now other women in Dominic's life, whilst Marilyn is trying to cope with a new town, a new baby and a new life, plus the guilt of having walked out on the marriage. Dominic is playing things a bit too tight for comfort. Marilyn find courage and the worm turns.

== Home media ==
Subsequently, the series remains commercially unreleased on either VHS or DVD.

== Critical reception ==
The Channel 4 drama examined the emotional fallout and shifting dynamics of these marriages in an intimate, slice-of-life style characteristic of the era's original television plays.
