= Uncle Max =

British children's television series

- Starring: David Schneider (Uncle Max); William Howe (Luke, Ser. 1); Jonathan Hanly (Luke, Ser. 2)
- Country of origin: United Kingdom
- No. of series: 2
- No. of episodes: 26

Production
- Producer: Andy Rowley Little Bird Pictures
- Running time: 10 minutes

Original release
- Network: CITV; CBBC
- Release: 31 January 2006 – 3 October 2008

Uncle Max is a British children's comedy television series originally aired on CITV, and CBBC. It features David Schneider as the title character, Uncle Max, and William Howe as Luke, Max's nine-year-old nephew. However, in the second series Jonathon Hanly took over from William. The show's basic premise is that Uncle Max is incapable of embarking on any adventure without creating chaos and upsetting another individual or a group of individuals in some way or the other.

The first series was filmed in Johannesburg in South Africa and produced by Andy Rowley over a seven-week block in the summer of 2005, the show was written by David Schneider and 13 episodes were made for CITV and screened on the CITV channel in 2006. The second series was filmed in Galway, in Ireland.

In an interview for The Times, David Schneider cited Laurel and Hardy, Tom and Jerry, Scooby-Doo and Wacky Races as influences on the show. Scheider additionally stated that the title character is named after his uncle, Max Ward, who was born in Hastings and used to get into various scrapes and adventures which would involve David himself.

The show contains very little spoken dialogue, mostly relying on vocal effects and physical comedy. It is made by Little Bird Pictures. Many of the actions are exaggerated for humor and filmed in slow motion to create some tension.

== List of episodes ==
Series 1 episodes with William Howe
Date	Title
31 January 2006	"Uncle Max Does the Washing"
1 February 2006	"Uncle Max Looks After the Baby"
2 February 2006	"Uncle Max Goes to the Cinema"
3 February 2006	"Uncle Max Plays Golf"
5 February 2006	"Uncle Max Goes Camping"
6 February 2006	"Uncle Max Goes to the Dentist"
7 February 2006	"Uncle Max Goes Bowling"
8 February 2006	"Uncle Max Buys Some Shoes"
9 February 2006	"Uncle Max Goes Flying"
10 February 2006	"Uncle Max Goes for a Pizza"
11 February 2006	"Uncle Max Runs a Race"
12 February 2006	"Uncle Max Goes to the Arcade"
13 February 2006	"Uncle Max Walks the Dog"

Series 2 episodes with Jonathan Hanly
Date	Title
11 July 2008	"Uncle Max Plays Tennis"
18 July 2008	"Uncle Max Goes to the Opera"
25 July 2008	"Uncle Max Goes to the Museum"
1 August 2008	"Uncle Max and the Wrestler"
8 August 2008	"Uncle Max Goes to a Wedding"
15 August 2008	"Uncle Max Builds a Shed"
22 August 2008	"Uncle Max and the Broken Vase"
29 August 2008	"Uncle Max Bakes a Cake"
5 September 2008	"Uncle Max at the Supermarket"
12 September 2008	"Uncle Max at Sports Day"
19 September 2008	"Uncle Max Goes Swimming"
26 September 2008	"Uncle Max Plays the Piano"
3 October 2008	"Uncle Max in the Wild West"

== Broadcasting ==
- United Kingdom – CBBC (formerly shown on CITV)
- Belgium/Flanders – Ketnet
