= Count Karlstein =

1982 novel by Philip Pullman

- First edition
- Author: Philip Pullman
- Published: 1982
- Publisher: Chatto & Windus
- ISBN: 9781524764999

Count Karlstein, or the Ride of the Demon Huntsman is the first children's novel written by British author Philip Pullman. It was published in 1982. The story was originally written by Pullman to be performed as a school play at Bishop Kirk Middle School, Oxford, where Pullman was an English teacher.

== Plot summary ==
The novel is set in the fictional Swiss village of Karlstein in 1816. Ten years prior, the evil Count Heimrich Karlstein made a deal with Zamiel, the Demon Huntsman, in order to obtain his current wealth, promising to present him with a human sacrifice on All Souls' Eve. The count has decided to offer his two young nieces, Lucy and Charlotte.

His plan does not go as smoothly as he would have preferred. Hildi Kelmar, a castle maidservant, overhears his plan to sacrifice Lucy and Charlotte and tries to save them.

The narrative shifts between the perspectives of a panoply of characters, including Hildi, Lucy, Charlotte, the girls' former teacher Miss Augusta Davenport, the inept coachman Max Grindoff, and a police report. Other characters that come to the girls' aid, willingly or not, are Meister Haifisch, the Count's lawyer; Doctor Cadaverezzi, a fraudulent magician employing Max as an assistant, who takes Lucy in as part of his act; Eliza, Miss Davenport's helper and Max's lover; Hildi's mother, a tavern owner; and Hildi's brother, Peter, a huntsman hiding from the law.

After hiding the girls, avoiding the Count and his cronies (Arturo Snivelwurst, his cowardly manservant, and Frau Muller, the castle's head servant), and helping several other people, Hildi has no choice but to send her fugitive brother, armed with a single silver bullet, to rescue the girls from the distant hunting cabin. He uses the bullet before encountering Zamiel, but the Demon Huntsman, recognizing Peter as a true hunter, spares him and those he protects, taking the life of Karlstein instead. The next day, Peter wins a shooting contest and the title of Chief Ranger of the Forest, securing his freedom. Meister Haifisch arrives and reveals that the true Count Karlstein is in fact the orphaned Max, who weds Eliza and raises Lucy and Charlotte. Finally, Miss Augusta and Doctor Cadaverezzi (whose real name is Signor Rolipolio), old lovers, reunite.

== Reception ==
Kirkus Reviews wrote "whirlwind plotting, manipulated into a pulsing tale of darkened hearts, treachery, and at long last, redemption." while Publishers Weekly, in a starred review, described it as "Dashing, sparkling and wildly over-the-top fun."

== Trivia ==
The novel borrows story elements from the opera Der Freischütz by Carl Maria von Weber.

Filmmaker Henry Selick has optioned the book with a view to making it into a film.
