= The Haunted Storm =

1972 novel by Philip Pullman

- First edition (publ. New English Library)
- Author: Philip Pullman
- Language: English
- Publisher: New English Library
- Publication date: 1972

The Haunted Storm (1972) is the debut novel of English author Philip Pullman. It was a joint winner of the New English Library's Young Writer's Award in 1972. Pullman later distanced himself from the work, saying "it was published by a publisher who didn't realise it wasn't a very good book", and as of 2016, he omits it from his entry in Who's Who.

== Characters ==
- Matthew Cortez.
- Elizabeth Cole.

== Plot summary ==
Unease and suspicion divide a small village following violence and death. Matthew Cortez is physically involved in the investigation, finding his spiritual problems have a greater depth of reality. Only in the final disastrous confrontation in a ruined Mithraic temple does he, at last, glimpse the possibility of peace.

The book was described by Antonia Fraser as an "honest and enterprising attempt to interweave the eternal and immortal longings of youth into the texture of a contemporary story".

== Themes ==
Gnosticism.
