= Jeopardy (British 2002 TV series) =

British–Australian children's TV series

- Genre: Drama; Science fiction
- Created by: Tim O'Mara
- Directed by: Paul Wroblewski
- Starring: Samantha Bowie; Kari Corbett; Gordon McCorkell; Craig Moncur; Shelley O'Neill; James Pearson; Stanley Smith; Charli Wilson
- Composer: Garry Hardman
- Countries of origin: United Kingdom; Australia
- Original language: English
- No. of series: 3
- No. of episodes: 40 (list of episodes)

Production
- Executive producers: Richard Langridge; Claire Mundell; Uzma Mir-Young
- Producer: Andy Rowley
- Cinematography: John Record; Marcus Hides; Oliver Cheesman; Andrew Conder
- Camera setup: Multi-camera
- Running time: 24 minutes
- Production companies: Wark Clements; CBBC Scotland

Original release
- Network: BBC One
- Release: 8 January 2002 – 11 May 2004

Jeopardy is a children's science fiction drama programme that ran for three series, from 26 April 2002 to 11 May 2004, on BBC One. It was created by Tim O'Mara, directed by Paul Wroblewski and produced by Andy Rowley, with executive production by Richard Langridge for Wark Clements and Claire Mundell for CBBC Scotland. The series was produced for CBBC Scotland and was filmed on location in both Scotland and Busselton, Australia. It also aired on ABC in Australia. In 2002, the British Academy of Film and Television Arts (BAFTA) awarded the first series Best Children's Drama.

== Plot ==
Jeopardy is about a group of eight secondary-school students and their teacher from Falkirk, Scotland, who travel to the Australian bush to look for UFOs. They are given camcorders to record any sightings, and the series makes extensive use of 'found' footage, ostensibly recorded by the characters themselves.

== Cast and characters ==
=== Main ===
- Samantha Bowie as Lucy Jeffers – Known to the group as something of a tomboy, Lucy is considered one of the fitter members of the group, and well-suited to the outdoor life. Mostly level-headed, she gets on well with Harry, and they begin a relationship later on.
- Kari Corbett as Sarah Fitzwilliam – Environmentally-conscious Sarah is known for having a keen interest in the environment and taking part in protests with her mother. She is the first member of the group to witness what she believes to be alien contact. After the first series, Corbett was not part of the main cast, being seen in flashes in the second series, and at the very start of the third.
- Gordon McCorkell as David Hedges – A science and UFO buff, David has extensive knowledge of flora and fauna, and an impeccable sense of direction. He is close friends with Harry but can get easily agitated; his insistence on believing that aliens are responsible for their predicament puts strain on the group's relationship. After the first series, McCorkell was not part of the main cast, being seen in flashes in the second series, and at the very start of the third.
- Craig Moncur as Harry Hastings – Although less fit and outgoing than the other members of the group, Harry is a natural leader, and in the absence of their teacher, Gerry Simmons, he takes charge of the group. He has epilepsy, and chooses to leave his medication behind having not suffered from attacks in two years. Later on, he begins a relationship with Lucy.
- Shelley O'Neill as Shona Campbell – Shona is the quietest member of the group, shy and very caring; however, she can let her emotions get the better of her. She can come across as grumpy and serious, but this is mainly because she is easily upset. She has strict parents; knowing they would not let her go on a trip related to UFOs, she pretended it was part of her geography course.
- James Pearson as Simon Tudor – Simon is athletic and sporty, the school's football captain and one of the fittest, fastest and strongest members of the group. However, he is also very arrogant and self-confident, and prone to making bad decisions under pressure, leading him to betray the group. As a result, he very rarely gets along with the rest of the group, though he does start a rocky relationship with Chrissie. His later experiences with Vic, a tour guide of Aboriginal descent, change his perspective and sees him fit in with the group more easily.
- Stanley Smith as Leon Duffy – An energetic and strong member of the group who does not always take things seriously, which often agitates the group. He likes to be the center of attention and brings a bit of laughter to the group. He tries to play the hero, especially for Shona, with whom he builds a rocky relationship. He is immature, but can be sensible and puts good ideas forward.
- Charli Wilson as Chrissie McAteer – A popular, fashion-conscious girl, often found wearing stylish clothing and complaining about the difficulties of staying in the outback. Having only come on the trip to get to know Simon better, she starts out self-centered, but through her experiences comes to care more for her friends than herself.

=== Recurring ===
- Tammy MacIntosh as Melissa (series 1) – Melissa is a park ranger. She was to help Gerry Simmons, the group's teacher, during their expedition. Shortly after realising the anti-venom was gone, Melissa treks out into the bush to find the jeeps and get help. She crashes, and tries to return to base-camp, but is captured by the diamond smugglers. She is found by the group shortly after finding Gerry, and was last seen waiting for the police while guarding her boss Arne, who was assisting his brother, the diamond smuggler.
- Steven Vidler as Gerry Simmons – The group's teacher and leader, in charge of the Falkirk Academy UFO Club. He planned the trip, he later disappears after falling over a waterfall. He is later found at the end of the series, having been tied up by the diamond thief, before being abducted with the rest of the group. He is the only one to have any memory of the encounter, and is believed to be mentally unstable by the government. He appears briefly in the second series when the group find him in the hospital, and he later reappears in the third series, helping them to find Astrid Island.
- Caroline Dunphy as Helen Stanich (series 2–3) – Stanich is responsible for monitoring abductees in Australia. Her goals aren't initially entirely clear to the group; in the beginning, she lies by telling the group that Sarah and David have been rescued with the rest of the group, when in reality they have not returned from their abduction. Following their escape from the detention centre, which she knowingly allowed to happen, she admits that the organisation she worked for wanted to destroy any evidence of the group's last encounter and capture the aliens for themselves, and was told to follow the group until their next encounter; once she finds out the group know where and when this encounter is due to happen, however, she and the group stage her kidnapping so she can guide them to the location of the encounter without her agents.
- Ilana Gelbart as Ruby Taylor (series 2)
- Shannyn Gelbart as Ann Taylor (series 2)
- Brad McMurray as Agent #1 (series 2)
- Bradley Byquar as Vic (series 2)
- Carl Henrik Gongsater as Witness / Twin 1 (series 3)
- Peta Sergeant as Professor Sharpe (series 3)
- Dave Anderson as Head Steward (series 3)

=== Guests ===
- Danny Roberts as Policeman (pilot episode)
- Peter Sumner as Arnie (series 1)
- Jerome Ehlers as Joe (series 1), the diamond smuggler
- Amy Mathews as Constable Tucker (series 2)
- Jared Robinsen as Birdwatcher / Nurse (series 2)
- Steven Tandy as Police Mechanic (series 3)
- Jenny Ryan as Miss Lewis (series 3)

== Series overview ==
=== Series 1 (2002) ===
The group travel to the Australian outback to look for extraterrestrial activity, with an increase in reported incidents attracting attention. The eight teenagers, their teacher, and a park ranger, Melissa Williams, stay in tents, with monitoring equipment set up around the area. On the first night, Sarah sees strange lights and is convinced that they were visited by aliens, but not everyone believes her. Soon after, Leon is bitten by a deadly snake, and the anti-venom is missing from the medical supplies. Melissa goes in search of medicine, but something stops her on the way, and when Gerry goes missing after falling over a waterfall, the teenagers find themselves alone.

The group see strange lights in the sky and radio signals are weakened by continual interference. David is thwarted by Simon and Chrissie who do their best to save themselves by sacrificing Melissa to the aliens. Later, the group members find both Gerry and Melissa, and discover that the alien activity was faked by smugglers who captured Melissa and are holding her ransom. With the mysterious events seemingly solved and Melissa standing guard over the smugglers until the police arrive, the teenagers and Gerry return to the ridge awaiting the rescue helicopters, only to be abducted by the aliens they had come to find.

=== Series 2 (2003) ===
The group find themselves back on the ridge and are picked up by helicopters before being returned to a military complex. The group realise their friends David and Sarah are missing, and Gerry, who has been ranting about an alien abduction, is separated from the rest of the group, who do not remember any such event. Escaping the facility, the group realise they have lost a whole day, and knowing they are being pursued by the agent from the complex, Helen Stanich, they purchase an old Kombi van to travel the country and look for David and Sarah, who appear to each member of the group over the course of the series as visions or dreams, guiding them.

Simon betrays the group by dealing with Stanich, thinking it was the right course to take, so the rest of the group lock him into a railway wagon for the night to teach him a lesson; they are separated when a train takes the wagon across the country overnight. The group continue to the Gold Coast to look for twins who they met at the facility and who may help them in their journey, while Simon is rescued by a man named Vic, an Aboriginal tour guide who shows him cave paintings that he believes depict the nature of time, as well as the fate of their group. After the twins guide the group to the same caves, they eventually meet up with Simon and deduce from the paintings that they will need to come together as a group at the Glass Mountains during the next visitation, occurring at the same time as a solar eclipse. With the help of Stanich, who claims to be working against her superiors, who want to capture the aliens, they arrive at the mountains and form a circle to bring the aliens back, in the hope that they will return their friends. They briefly see David and Sarah, who beckon them to come forward, but shortly after, they begin to fade.

=== Series 3 (2004) ===
Realising they have broken the circle, and with their friends fading away, the group quickly reform the circle and find themselves back home in Falkirk, six weeks in the future and invisible to everyone. They encounter a shocked David and Sarah, the only people able to see them, who explain that they were both returned to Falkirk after the night of the Glass Mountains with no memory of the encounter there; everyone believes the six teenagers and Gerry to be dead, while an eyewitness in Australia reports seeing four teenagers swim out to their deaths. While David and Sarah stay in Scotland, the rest of the group return to Australia via the same time travel portal they arrived at.

Back in Australia three days from their apparent death, they find themselves visible again, and are continually pursued by Stanich. They realise that they must try to contact the aliens so that everything can be returned to normal, but they soon discover that they are suffering from a condition they name the "red-eye virus" – when an individual is stressed or fears for their life, their left eye glows red and they appear to "split", as if they are two separate people for a number of seconds, before vanishing. Leon is the first to suffer this fate, shortly followed by a panicked Shona, and Chrissie, whose rescue of Lucy from a passing truck puts her in fear of her life. During their search they find Gerry, who has escaped from hospital, and travel to a top-secret base on Astrid Island; the group are surprised to find their friends who had disappeared, but are dismayed to find they have the mentality of seven-year-olds, and appear black on an infra-red camera (according to a research document, they have been "frozen in time").

After the splitting of Gerry and Simon, Harry and Lucy realise that the eyewitness was actually watching the two of them in the water, just before they split. Avoiding their fate by remaining calm, they meet the eyewitness who is in fact one of two twin boys, who reveal themselves as aliens. They inform them that they are an ancient branch of the human race that evolved millions of years ago, before leaving the planet to avoid an asteroid, and that all of their species are twins. The red-eye virus was an unintended side-effect of being taken aboard their space craft, likely due to the solar flare activity from the eclipse, and that there is no known cure. With the clues they provide, Harry and Lucy realise the island is another portal, and persuade their friends to form a circle. This allows the pair to travel back in time to Falkirk on the day of the UFO meeting and manage to convince an initially skeptical group not to go to Australia by showing them the tapes they recorded throughout the show.

=== Ending ===
At the end of series 3, CBBC viewers were asked to vote for a way to end the series. The choices were a "spooky", "happy", or "surprising" ending. On the premiere of the final episode, the "spooky" ending won the vote; on a later repeat of the episode, the vote was run again, but the "happy" ending was chosen.

- The "spooky" ending left the series on a cliffhanger, as a past Harry and Lucy encountered the future incarnations of themselves, who have returned from the future. Lucy is shocked at the sight of her past self. Realising that two separate versions of herself now exist in one timeline, the red-eye virus kicks in, and the series ends with the future of Lucy being uncertain.
- The "happy" ending was the same as the spooky ending, but the episode ended before the alternate versions of Harry and Lucy entered the room.
- The "surprise" ending has never aired, but creator Tim O'Mara has remarked that this ending would have revealed that Harry and Lucy, along with the rest of the group, were actually alien clones, and that the red-eye virus was a way of keeping the clones in check.

== Awards ==
Year	Nominee / work	Award	Result
2002	Jeopardy	British Academy Children's Award for Drama	Won
