= Clockwork (novel) =

1996 children's book by Philip Pullman

- First edition (UK)
- Author: Philip Pullman
- Illustrator: Peter Bailey
- Language: English
- Genre: Children's novel
- Publisher: Doubleday
- Publication date: 1996
- Publication place: United Kingdom
- Media type: Print
- Pages: 92 pp
- ISBN: 0-385-40755-6
- OCLC: 36964106

Clockwork, or All Wound Up is an illustrated short children's book by Philip Pullman, first published in the United Kingdom in 1996 by Doubleday, and in the United States by Arthur A. Levine Books in 1998. The Doubleday edition was illustrated by Peter Bailey and the Arthur A. Levine Books edition was illustrated by Leonid Gore. It was shortlisted for both the Whitbread Children's Book Award and for a Carnegie Medal in 1997.

Pullman has said his novel was inspired by an old clock he came across in London's Science Museum. Noting the movement of the clock's gears, he wrote the story with elements that move in opposite directions.

== Plot ==
Clockwork is set in the fictional town of Glockenheim in Germany in "the old days". It has three main characters: Karl, an apprentice clockmaker who has failed to make a figure for the town clock; Gretl, who is a very selfless young girl and is the daughter of the innkeeper of Glockenheim and Fritz, a local writer whose unfinished story sets the gears of Clockwork turning.

The townspeople gather in the White Horse Tavern the evening before a new figure for their town clock made by Karl is to be unveiled. Karl, however, admits to Fritz that he has not made the figure, the first apprentice in hundreds of years to fail to do so.

The people in the tavern listen to Fritz read his latest story about a local aristocrat, Prince Otto, and his young son, Prince Florian. Prince Otto dies at a hunting lodge and has his heart replaced with a clockwork mechanism. Fritz wrote down the story after having a dream, but he has not thought of an ending for it, and hopes that he will be able to think up one on the spot: "He was just going to wind up the story, set it going, and make up the end when he got there."

The story begins to come true when Dr. Kalmeneius comes to the door of the tavern. Fritz flees in terror. Dr. Kalmenius offers Karl a clockwork figure called Sir Ironsoul, which Karl accepts. Karl's acceptance of the gift sets in motion a chain of interlocking stories. A price must be paid for this gift, as Sir Ironsoul is a mechanical knight that comes alive and kills anyone who says the word "Devil". Only the song "The Flowers of Lapland" can stop him and put him back to sleep.

The narrative shifts back and forwards through time. Prince Otto, having been unable to produce an heir, was revealed to have had requested a clockmaker, Dr Kalmenius, to build a son for him out of clockwork: this becomes Prince Florian, who grows up to be a kind and well-mannered prince, but later breaks down as his mechanical heart winds down and he is rendered unable to speak, but instead only able to produce sounds akin to a music box. It is revealed that Prince Florian requires a heart transplant to work again: Baron Stelgratz, a friend of Otto, agrees to donate his own heart, but sacrifices himself when Otto and Florian's sledge are attacked by wolves. Prince Otto, upon reaching the lodge, demands Kalmenius to kill him and place his heart inside Florian's torso. Kalmenius agrees, and replaces Otto's heart with a clockwork mechanism that enables him to drive his son home in their sledge for long enough until his body gives out. Finally, Prince Florian reaches the door of an inn: unable to speak, he sings "The Flowers of Lapland" before the story concludes.

All the stories come together as one. Gretl is the only person who can restore true life to him. Karl places Prince Florian in the clock's tower as his apprentice piece upon his discovery, and plots to keep Sir Ironsoul by himself and use it to travel the world, earning fame through exhibitions and performances, and using Sir Ironsoul to trick people into saying "devil" and steal a large fortune to make himself rich. However, Karl becomes increasingly paranoid before being frightened by a black cat, exclaiming "Oh! What the devil-?" and being killed by Sir Ironsoul. Gretl finishes the journey by bringing Prince Florian to life through her unselfish love, while Fritz escapes to another part of Germany to amass a fortune writing speeches for politicians. As for Dr. Kalmenius, his fate is left up for debate as he is "only a character in a story, after all."

== Literary analysis ==
Clockwork has been described as an exciting, suspenseful fairy tale written in an ironic and amusing style. It has a strong moral message. Pullman uses the literary technique of parallel authorial commentary, similar to Rudyard Kipling in Just So Stories. He uses the idea of clockwork as a metafictive device, comparing the interrelated plot elements to the elements of a clock's mechanism.

Pullman provides a moral critique of contemporary Western culture in Clockwork. It is a metaphor for the idea that humanity has been sacrificed as society has become more mechanised. Prince Otto's clockwork heart is a direct allusion to the famous quotation from Thomas Carlyle's 19th-century essay "Signs of the Times": "Men are grown mechanical in head and in heart, as well as in hand".

The essay was a warning to Victorian society about the dangers of industrialisation and capitalism. Pullman's novel has a similar warning.

The author also takes the moral position that fulfilment cannot come solely from dreams, and needs dedicated hard work allied with inspiration to be achieved. Karl makes a Faustian bargain with Dr. Kalmenius because he wants an easy way to fulfil his ambition. The Faustian allusions are made clear when Sir Ironsoul becomes murderous when the word "devil" is mentioned and can only be stopped by a special song.

The novel also has allusions to Mary Shelley's Frankenstein. Fritz's story comes to him in a dream, similar to how Shelley experienced the writing of her novel. Dr. Kalmenius can be compared to Dr. Frankenstein as he seeks the secret of life and is prepared to make a monster to do this.

== Stage adaptation ==
A version with music by Stephen McNeff and libretto by David Wood toured the United Kingdom before playing in the Linbury Studio Theatre at London's Royal Opera House in March 2004. The production's orchestra was formed from musicians from the Philharmonia Orchestra and Martin Music Scholarship Fund Award Scheme.
