= Paul Wroblewski =

British television director

Paul Wroblewski is a British television director. He has directed many TV programmes and shows, including one series of BAFTA-winning television show Jeopardy^.

== Career ==
Jeopardy won in BAFTA's Children's Drama section. Tim O'Mara created and directed the series under series producer Andy Rowley and Wark Clements executive Richard Langridge. Both worked on all three series shot in Sydney and Gold Coast, Australia.

In 2009 The Bill received an award for the production team -their first BAFTA award after 26 years together. The award was in the 'Continuing Drama' category. Wroblewski was one of the directors on the series.

At the 2011 BAFTA awards, he gained his 3rd BAFTA for The Only Way Is Essex winner in the category 'YouTube Audience Award'.

== Filmography ==
=== Director ===
- Emmerdale (unknown episodes)
- Brookside (unknown episodes)
- EastEnders (10 episodes, 1997–2006)
- Casualty (9 episodes, 1998–2006)
- Holby City (4 episodes, 1999–2001)
- The Knock (unknown episodes, 2000)
- Peak Practice (4 episodes, 2000)
- Silent Witness (2 episodes, 2002)
- Jeopardy (2002)
- Blue Murder (pilot episode, 2003–2008)
- Patrick's Planet (2005)
- The Bill (9+ episodes, 2006–2009)
- Desperados (2007) (unknown episodes)
- As the Bell Rings (unknown episodes)
- The Bill (unknown episodes, 2010)
- The Only Way Is Essex (unknown episodes, 2010–2011)
- Hollyoaks (unknown episodes, 2011)
