= Loved Up =

1995 British television drama

- Written by: Ol Parker
- Directed by: Peter Cattaneo
- Country of origin: United Kingdom
- Original language: English

Production
- Producers: David M. Thompson; Elinor Day
- Cinematography: Ivan Strasburg
- Editor: David Gamble

Original release
- Network: BBC Two
- Release: 23 September 1995

Cover of 1999 BBC VHS release of the play

Loved Up is a BBC drama, first shown on TV on 23 September 1995 on the BBC 2 Originally this was a school information film for teenagers to show the risks of taking ecstasy, first shown to schoolchildren in the UK in 1992 and part of the Love Bites series. The film was directed by Peter Cattaneo, and starred Lena Headey, Ian Hart and Charlie Creed-Miles, plus appearances by Jason Isaacs and Danny Dyer. The drama is notable for being the first collaboration between BBC Drama Screen Two (BBC Two) and Scene (BBC Education) with series associate producer Andy Rowley. Loved Up won a BAFTA award as Best Children's Drama in 1996.

== Story ==
The story revolves around Tom, age 21, played by Ian Hart, who meets Sarah, aged 18, played by Lena Headey, in the cafe in which she works as a waitress. It quickly blossoms into romance, and she becomes involved in Tom's way of life, drug use and raves, where she finds solace from the chaos of her own family life. The plot follows her introduction to clubbing and the taking of ecstasy, the story includes her relationship with Tom, and her escape from family problems, leaving her teenage sister at home to deal with their mother's impending breakdown.

The film culminates with Sarah's mother's drinking problem leading to an attempted suicide, and Sarah asking Tom for help by leaving him a vague answerphone message he does not actually receive in time to be able to do anything. Sarah ends her relationship with Tom, and the film finishes with Tom dropping another pill, and dancing his troubles away.

== Production ==
A 2 x 30 minute abridged version of the story (the original screening was 70 minutes) was screened as part of the BBC Schools Scene series in October 1995, and subsequently repeated a number of times.

== Soundtrack ==
A soundtrack to accompany the film was also produced and featured artists such as The Prodigy, Orbital and Leftfield.

=== Loved Up (original release) ===
The first release of the soundtrack was 1 CD and according to www.amazon.co.uk has the following track listing (note that Plastic Dream should be Plastic Dreams): This Cd was compiled by Peter Whelan & Brian Monaghan AKA Flystyle & Mello in Node recording studios on SADIE digital editing system.

(Title / Artist)

1. Smoke Belch II - Sabres Of Paradise
2. Crystal Clear - Grid
3. Prologue - 10th Chapter
4. Two Full Moons And A Trout - Union Jack
5. Little Bullet - Spooky
6. Gut Drum Mix - Funtopia
7. Plastic Dream - Jaydee
8. Break And Enter - Prodigy
9. Acperience - Hardfloor
10. Surjestive - Advances
11. Melt - Leftfield

=== Totally Loved Up ===
The soundtrack was re-released as Totally Loved Up with an additional CD, and on vinyl, containing more music from the film.

==== CD1 ====
(Artist / Title)
01 Grid, The - Crystal Clear 4:31
02 Bedrock - For What You Dream Of 6:43
03 Funtopia - Do You Wanna Know (Gut Drum Mix) 6:02
04 Hardfloor - Acperience 8:04
05 Union Jack - Two Full Moons And A Trout 7:05
06 Orbital - Attached 12:12
07 Rebound - Make It Funky 7:38
08 Surjestive - Advances 4:55
09 Spooky - Little Bullet Part 1 7:28
10 Leftfield - Melt 4:27

==== CD2 ====
(Artist / Title)
01 Richard Kirk - Oneski 5:31
02 Tenth Chapter - Prologue 6:30
03 Grid, The - Shapes Of Sleep 6:06
04 Union Jack - Lollipop Man 6:21
05 Prodigy, The - Full Throttle 4:48
06 A Zone - Calling The People 5:26
07 Banco de Gaia - Soufie 6:42
08 Jaydee - Plastic Dreams 10:05
09 Leftfield - Song Of Life 7:10
10 Orbital - Forever 7:56
11 Sabres Of Paradise - Smokebelch 2 (Beatless Mix) 4:16

==== Vinyl ====
Released as a triple record set (catalog number PRIMA LP 2), with the following track listing:

Record A Side 1
- Sabres Of Paradise - Smokebelch 11 (Beatless Mix) 4.14
- Prodigy, The - Break and Enter 8.24
Record A Side 2
- Suggestive - Advances 5.46
- Spooky - Little Bullet Part 1 8.10
Record B Side 1
- Grid, The - Crystal Clear 4:36
- Hardfloor - Acperience 9.00
Record B Side 2
- Union Jack - Two Full Moons And A Trout 7.46
- Leftfield - Melt 5.11
Record C Side 1
- Bedrock - For What You Dream Of 7.25
- Jaydee - Plastic Dreams 5.24
Record C Side 2
- 10th Chapter - Prologue 6.52
- Funtopia - Gut Drum Mix 6.22

== Video release ==
The film was released on VHS in 1999, but is now deleted. As of August 2023, it has not been released on DVD.

== Cast ==
- Sarah - Lena Headey
- Tom - Ian Hart
- Danny - Charlie Creed-Miles
- Dez 1 - Clarence Smith
- Ruth - Linda Bassett
- Karen - Milly Gregory
- Dez 2 - Jason Isaacs
- Cocker - Rick Warden
- Ifti - Andrew Rajan
- Donna - Sheila Whitfield
- Ray - Philip Glenister
- Cab driver - Trevor Cooper
- Nigel - Charles Edwards
- Billy - Danny Dyer
- Pat - Claire Sabre
- Ron - David Aldous
- First PC - Luke Williams
- Second PC - Chris Jenkinson
- Dozing raver - Gavin Hills
