= David Aldus =

Welsh painter

David Aldus (18 09 1941 - 27 01 2025 ) was a Welsh painter, known for his landscape and maritime scenery.

== Personal life ==
Aldus was born in the Garrison town of Brecon, where he spent much of his life. Both his father, John Macdonald Aldus, and his grandfather were company sergeant majors in the South Wales Borderers. Latter got killed in action at the Khyber pass. His grandfather maternal side, William Godfrey, was a miner of the Blaenavon pit.

== Art ==
Aldus developed a style similar to Realism, influenced by the French artist Jules Bastien-Lepage and the colourful primitivism of Cézanne.

His painting "A Tribute to the people of Malta" is being displayed in the Museum of Valletta. Many of his landscapes are views of Buckinghamshire/Oxfordshire and its surrounding countryside. He was a finalist in the Garrick/Milne Prize exhibition at London's Christies, exhibited at the Lambeth Palace under the auspices of the Royal Society of Marine Artists and participated in exhibitions of the Royal Society of British Artists.

In 1994, he gained membership at UA United Artists and won the Acrylic Painting prize at Westminster Central Hall in the same year. In 1995, Aldus received the Oil paintings prize at the UA annual exhibition. During this time, he had work of his own displayed at the Royal Institute of Oil Painters in their annual exhibition at the Mall Galleries in London.

In December 1995, Judge Edward Lucie-Smith selected his work for the Discerning Eye exhibition.

Aldus completed commissions for actor David Jason and ice skater Christopher Dean. In 1984, he was commissioned to paint Britain's first black female mayor Lydia Simmons in Slough. Aldus has also done work for Freddie Starr, the Duchess of Devonshire, Lord Carrington and rock star Jamiroquai.
