= David Aldous (actor) =

English actor and broadcaster

- Occupations: actor, broadcaster

David Aldous is an English actor and broadcaster. He has appeared in TV series, such as The Bill and Casualty, and in the film Loved Up. He has also presented the programmes In Depth for GOD TV and Passages of Life for Premier Christian Radio. Since 27 July 2009, he has presented Hope in the Night from 1am to 4am on Premier Christian Radio.

== Family life ==
David Aldous lives in Essex and has four children.

== Teaching ==
He was a drama teacher at Hassenbrook School in Essex.

== Videos ==
David Aldous directed the Christian music video "How Deep", sung by Charlotte Lauren, music by Stuart Townend.
