= Oxford Literary Festival =

Annual literary festival in Oxford, England

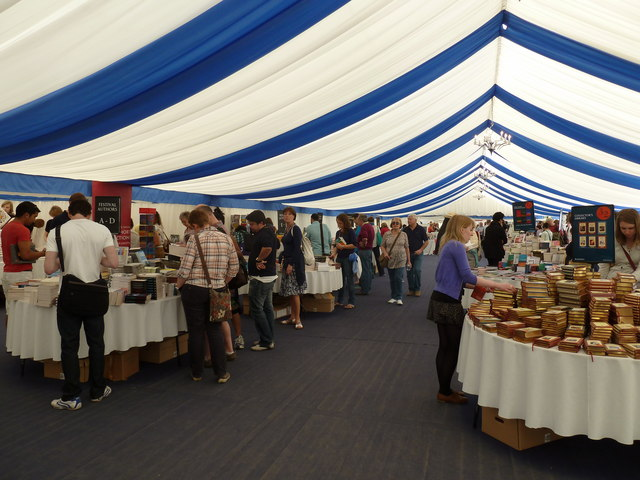
- The festival in 2011
- Abbreviation: OLF
- Named after: Oxford
- Formation: 2001; 25 years ago
- Founded at: Oxford
- Type: Nonprofit
- Registration no.: Charity number: 1128820
- Legal status: charity
- Purpose: literary festival
- Headquarters: Oxford
- Location: Oxford, United Kingdom
- Coordinates: 51.75034°N 1.25586°W
- Region served: United Kingdom
- Products: books
- Services: talks
- Official language: English
- Affiliations: The Sunday Times; The Telegraph
- Funding: entrance tickets
- Website: oxfordliteraryfestival.org
- Formerly called: Sunday Times Oxford Literary Festival

The Oxford Literary Festival (OLF) is an annual literary festival held in Oxford, England.

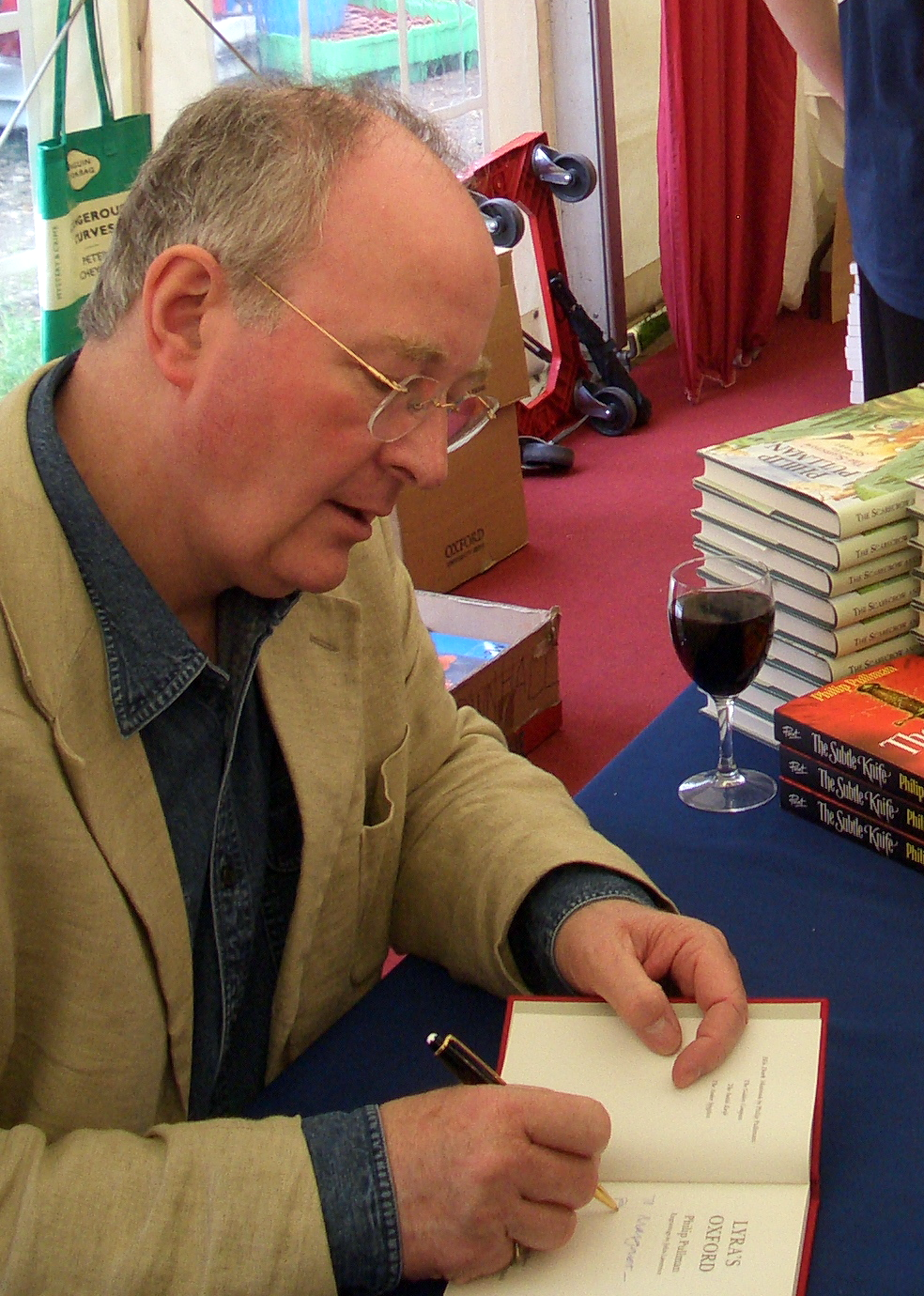
Philip Pullman signing a copy of Lyra's Oxford at the 2005 festival

The festival events take place in venues across central Oxford, such as Blackwell's bookshop, the Bodleian Library, the Sheldonian Theatre, the Weston Library, and Oxford colleges such as Christ Church and Worcester College. The festival includes international authors, journalists, intellectuals, historians, and poets. OLF is a registered charity on the Charity Commission for England and Wales.

In January 2016, the Oxford novelist Philip Pullman resigned as a patron of the Oxford Literary Festival in support of the Society of Authors' campaign for writers to be paid fees at literary festivals. The Bodley Medal, the highest honour issued by the Bodleian Library in Oxford, is awarded at the festival. In 2024, it was awarded to Philip Pullman.

The festival has previously been associated with The Sunday Times and Financial Times newspapers, but now partners with The Telegraph.
