= Outram Marshall =

Church of England clergyman

Thomas Outram Marshall (1843 – 14 February 1932), known as Outram Marshall, was a Church of England clergyman, an active supporter of the Oxford Movement who became Organising Secretary of the English Church Union.

== Early life and education ==
Outram Marshall was born in India, the third son of Thomas Marshall, of Sukkur, in the Bombay Presidency of British India. On 12 October 1861, aged eighteen, he matriculated at New College, Oxford, as a scholar of the college, and held his scholarship until 1866, when he graduated BA.

Marshall was a contemporary at Oxford of the Mohawk student Oronhyatekha, whom he took under his wing on the Canadian’s arrival in 1862.

== Career ==
Marshall was ordained a deacon of the Church of England in 1866 and a priest the next year. He was curate at Batcombe, Somerset, from 1866 to 1869, and after that until 1872 curate of Frome Selwood. He then became Organising Secretary of the English Church Union, an Anglo-Catholic advocacy group within the Church of England.

Marshall was Patron of the benefices of St Nicholas, Perivale, and of Roos with Tunstall, in the East Riding of Yorkshire, which meant having the right to choose the parish priest. In 1911, he gave the patronage of Perivale to the Society for the Maintenance of the Faith, and in 1928 also gave the Society that of Roos.

In 1917, Marshall wrote to the Church League for Women Suffrage on behalf of the Church Union to object to suggestions that the Church Union to some degree supported admitting women to the priesthood.

== Personal life ==
In 1883, Marshall married Emilie Susannah Loder Strange, born 1854, the daughter of manufacturer William James Stevenson Strange. Their only child, Emilie Louisa Loder was born in Kensington in 1884. In 1915, during the First World War, while the Marshalls were living at Pinewood, Oriental Road, Woking, their daughter Emilie married Major Alfred Hopewell Pullman, of the Royal West Kent Regiment, a decorated Boer War officer who a few months later gained the DSO for gallantry at the Battle of Loos. In March 1918, Pullman retired from the army due to ill health caused by the war, and joined the Marshall family at Woking.

Marshall died on 14 February 1932, still living at Pinewood, leaving an estate valued at £3,296.
