= Philip Pullman =

English author (born 1946)

Sir Philip Pullman CBE FRSL
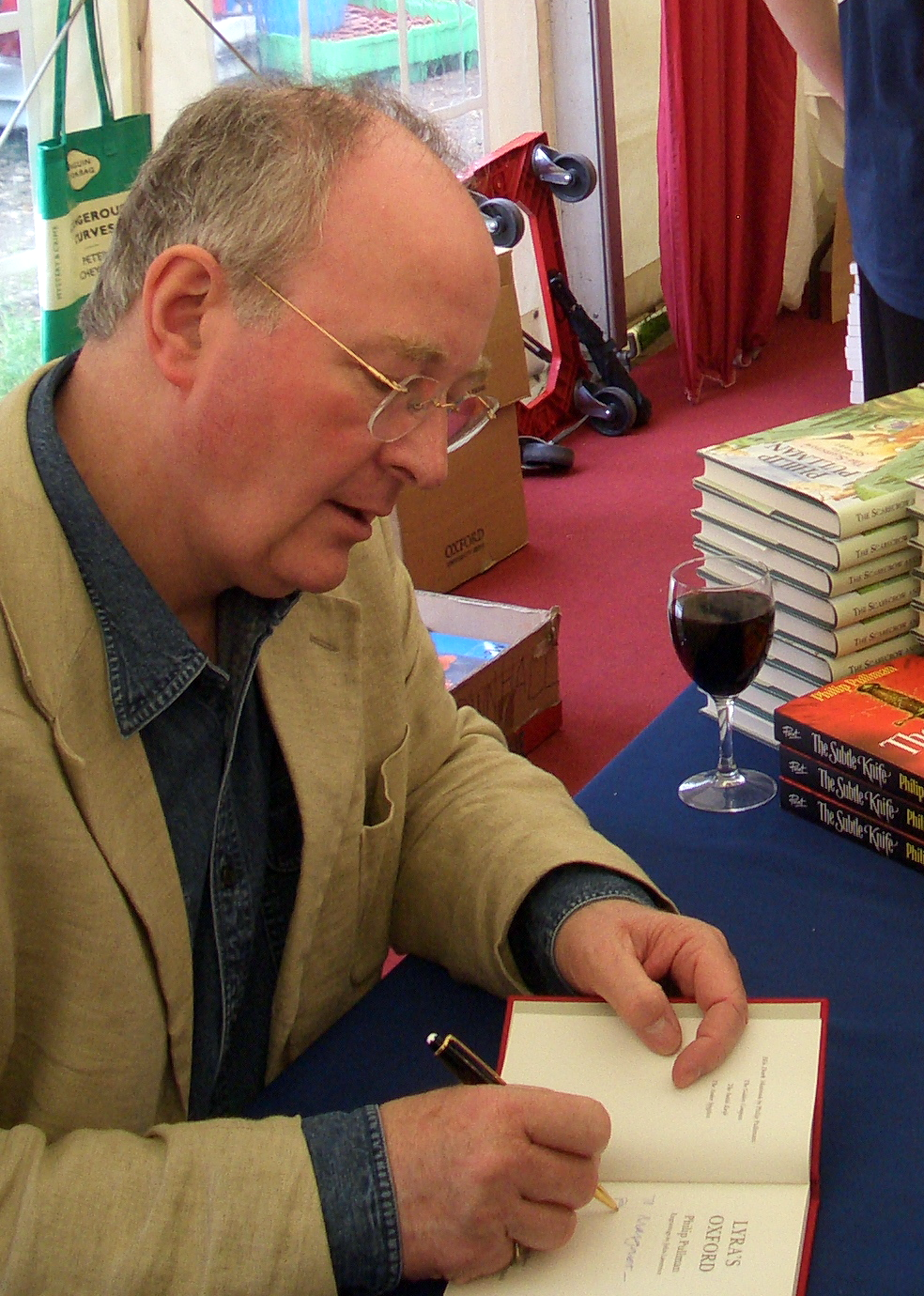
- Pullman at the Oxford Literary Festival in April 2005
- Born: 19 October 1946 (age 80); Norwich, England
- Education: Exeter College, Oxford (BA)
- Occupation: Novelist
- Spouse: Judith Speller (m. 1970)
- Children: 2
- Parent(s): Alfred Outram Pullman; Audrey Evelyn Merrifield
- Relatives: Outram Marshall (great-grandfather)
- Writing career
- Genre: Fantasy
- Notable works: His Dark Materials; Clockwork, or All Wound Up; The Good Man Jesus and the Scoundrel Christ; The Book of Dust
- Notable awards: Carnegie Medal; 1995; Guardian Prize; 1996; Astrid Lindgren Award; 2005
- Website: philip-pullman.com

Sir Philip Nicholas Outram Pullman (born 19 October 1946) is an English writer. He is best known for the fantasy trilogy His Dark Materials. The first volume, Northern Lights (1995), won the Carnegie Medal and later the "Carnegie of Carnegies". The third volume, The Amber Spyglass (2000), won the Whitbread Award. In 2017, he started a companion trilogy, The Book of Dust, of which the final novel, The Rose Field, was published in October 2025.

He was knighted in the 2019 New Year Honours for services to literature, and has been awarded several honorary doctorates and other honours. Children's Literature Laureate Michael Morpurgo said of Pullman: "The range and depth of his imagination and of his learning certainly make him the Tolkien of our day".

== Early life and education ==
Philip Nicholas Outram Pullman was born in Norwich.

His grandfather was a Church of England rector, and gave him a love of storytelling. His father, Alfred Outram Pullman, a Royal Air Force pilot, was killed in a plane crash in Kenya in 1954, when Pullman was seven, and was posthumously awarded the Distinguished Flying Cross (DFC). Pullman later said that, as a boy, he saw his father as "a hero, steeped in glamour, killed in action defending his country", and said he thought his father had been "training pilots". Pullman was then presented with a report from The London Gazette of 1954 which "said that the medal was given for 'gallant and distinguished service' during the Mau Mau uprising". Responding to that new information, Pullman wrote: "Given what we now know about British behaviour during the insurgency, my father probably doesn't come out of this with very much credit, judged by the standards of modern liberal progressive thought" and he accepted the revelation as "a serious challenge to his childhood memory".

His mother remarried the following year to a friend of his father and fellow RAF pilot, whom Pullman liked. The family moved to North Wales. He remembers his mother reading him Just So Stories: "Kipling's rhythms must have got into my memory". His favourite childhood book was Erich Kästner's Emil and the Three Twins, "It was only much later that I realised why that book had such a deep effect on me: like mine, Emil's mother had been widowed, and he didn't want her to marry again". Pullman discovered comics, including Superman and Batman, and continues to enjoy the medium, citing Hergé's Adventures of Tintin as an influence.

He attended Taverham Hall School and Eaton House.

Around 1956, Pullman and his family spent around 18 months in South Australia, after his stepfather was posted to Woomera. He remembers seeing the largest flood ever recorded in South Australia, which he remembers vividly, later using it in the central plot line of the first volume in his second trilogy of novels, The Book of Dust, La Belle Sauvage. He also remembers living in the Adelaide beachside suburb of Glenelg in 1956.

From 1957, Pullman was educated at Ysgol Ardudwy in Harlech, Gwynedd, spending time in Norfolk with his grandfather, a clergyman. When he was 12 or 13, he heard older students reciting T. S. Eliot's "Journey of the Magi", which was when he realised that poetry was going to be very important to him. Poetry taught him that words have "weight and colour and taste and shape as well as meaning." A few years later, Pullman discovered John Milton's Paradise Lost, which would become a major influence on His Dark Materials. He said that he discovered that poetry "had the power to stir a physical response: my heart beat faster, the hair on my head stirred, my skin bristled". Other influences include Homer, Virgil and Dante. At the age of 16, he discovered Donald Allen's anthology The New American Poetry 1945-1960, which "burst into my life... and changed the course of everything for me. Allen Ginsberg's "Howl" was part of it; I had no idea poetry could do anything like that". Ginsberg led him to William Blake: "My mind and my body reacted to certain lines from the Songs of Innocence and of Experience, from The Marriage of Heaven and Hell... I knew they were true in the way I knew that I was alive". Influenced by Bob Dylan, he wrote poems and songs, none of which were recorded.

From 1965, Pullman attended Exeter College, Oxford, receiving a Third Class BA in 1968. In an interview with The Oxford Student, he noted that he "did not really enjoy the English course", and that "I thought I was doing quite well until I came out with my third class degree and then I realised that I wasn't – it was the year they stopped giving fourth class degrees otherwise I'd have got one of those".

Pullman married Judith Speller in 1970 and they have two sons. At the time of his marriage he began teaching children aged 9 to 13 at Bishop Kirk Middle School in Summertown, North Oxford, where he also wrote school plays. He retold classics for his students, notably the Iliad and the Odyssey.

== Writing ==
His debut novel, The Haunted Storm (1972) was joint-winner of the New English Library's Young Writer's Award, but he refuses to discuss it. He followed it with Galatea, (1978) an adult fantasy. Kirkus Reviews wrote: "Pullman is not without ideas or talent; both shine often enough through this grandiose muddle to make one wonder what he'll do next." His school plays inspired his first children's book, Count Karlstein (1982). He stopped teaching shortly after the publication of The Ruby in the Smoke (1985), a Victorian mystery and the first book in the Sally Lockhart quartet, followed by The Shadow in the North (1986), The Tiger in the Well (1990) and The Tin Princess (1994). He collaborated with David Mostyn on Spring-Heeled Jack (1989), a combination of graphic novel and text based on a penny dreadful character. Publishers Weekly wrote: "this waggish, innovative story of a courageous trio is sure to engage even the most reluctant reader." He wrote the realist novel The Broken Bridge (1990), "a love letter to that landscape of North Wales."

Between 1988 and 1996, Pullman taught part-time at Westminster College, Oxford, continuing to write children's stories. He began His Dark Materials in about 1993. While working on the trilogy, he wrote The Firework-Maker's Daughter (1995), Clockwork, or All Wound Up (1996) and I Was a Rat! or, The Scarlet Slippers (1999), which he called fairy tales. The Firework-Maker's Daughter won the Gold Nestlé Smarties Book Prize.

Pullman began writing full-time in 1996, continuing to deliver talks and write occasionally for The Guardian, including writing and lecturing about education, often criticising unimaginative education policies. He was awarded a CBE in the New Year's Honours list in 2004. That year, he was elected President of the Blake Society and guest-edited The Mays Literary Anthology, a collection of new writing from students at the Universities of Oxford and Cambridge. He returned to fairy tales with The Scarecrow and His Servant (2004), which won the Silver Smarties Prize.

In 2008, he authored "The Adventures of John Blake" for the British children's comic The DFC with artist John Aggs and began The Book of Dust, a companion trilogy to His Dark Materials. In 2012, during a break from writing The Book of Dust, Pullman was asked by Penguin Classics to curate 50 of Grimms' classic fairytales, from their compendium of over 200 stories. "They are not all of the same quality", said Pullman. "Some are easily much better than others. And some are obvious classics. You can't do a selected Grimms' without Rumpelstiltskin, Cinderella and so on." In 2017, a collection of his lectures and essays were published as Daemon Voices: On Stories and Storytelling.

== His Dark Materials ==
His Dark Materials is a trilogy consisting of Northern Lights (titled The Golden Compass in North America), The Subtle Knife and The Amber Spyglass. The trilogy's title comes from Book II of Paradise Lost.

Northern Lights takes place in a parallel universe where peoples' souls are embodied in animals called dæmons. Pullman was influenced by Socrates's daimon, described in Plato's Apology of Socrates. The trilogy centres around Lyra Belacqua, a girl initially growing up in Jordan College, Oxford. Northern Lights won both the annual Carnegie Medal and the Guardian Children's Fiction Prize, a similar award that authors may not win twice. (Note: Alternatively, six authors have won the Carnegie Medal for their Guardian Prize-winning books. Professional librarians confer the Carnegie and select the winner from all British children's books (although it was established in 1936 as a once-in-a-lifetime award). The Guardian newspaper's prize winner is selected by British children's writers, "peers" of the author who has not yet won it, for one children's (age 7+) or young-adult fiction book. Details regarding author and publisher nationality have varied.) The Subtle Knife introduces Will Parry, a boy from our universe. The Amber Spyglass moves across several universes. It was awarded both 2001 Whitbread Prize for best children's book and the Whitbread Book of the Year prize in January 2002, the first children's book so honoured.

In 2003, the trilogy ranked third in the BBC's The Big Read, a poll of 200 top novels voted by the British public.

Pullman has written three companion pieces to the trilogy: Lyra's Oxford (2003), Once Upon a Time in the North (2008) and Serpentine (2020).

== The Book of Dust ==
The Book of Dust includes characters and events from His Dark Materials. Pullman has said that the new series is neither sequel, nor prequel, but an "equel".

La Belle Sauvage, the first volume of The Book of Dust, was published by Penguin Random House Children's and David Fickling in the UK and by Random House Children's in the US in 2017. A sequel, The Secret Commonwealth, was published in October 2019. It includes a character named after Nur Huda el-Wahabi, a 16-year-old victim of London's Grenfell Tower fire. As part of the charity auction Authors for Grenfell Tower, Pullman offered the highest bidder a chance to name a character in the upcoming trilogy. Ultimately, he raised £32,400. The third and final book in the trilogy, The Rose Field, was published on 23 October 2025.

== Style, themes, and influences ==
In an epigraph to The Amber Spyglass, Pullman wrote that: "My principle when researching a novel is 'Read like a butterfly, write like a bee', and if this story contains any honey, it is entirely because of the quality of the nectar that I found in the work of better writers. But there are three debts that need to be acknowledged above the rest. One is to the essay 'On the Marionette Theatre' by Heinrich von Kleist, which I first read in translation by Idris Parry in the Times Literary Supplement in 1978. The other is to John Milton's Paradise Lost. The third is to the works of William Blake." He credits his teacher Enid Jones with "showing him that responsibility and delight can coexist."

Christina Patterson writes that "The Firework-Maker's Daughter is both an adventure story and an extended metaphor for the making of art. Clockwork is a gothic fantasy with a sinister twist, which draws heavily on German Romanticism. It's also a philosophical parable, playing with notions of free will, cause and effect. I Was a Rat! is a rollicking romp about Roger the rat-boy, but - as the title implies - it's also a brilliant parody of the sleazier reaches of journalism." Pullman says "What I hope is that the stories I write will entertain both the young readers and the older ones. What I don't want to do is to write the sort of book that has silly slapstick for children and clever stuff for the grown-ups. I want them all to enjoy the same bits for the same reason - but maybe see different things in it.

He has incorporated science into his writing. His Dark Materials draws on the many worlds interpretation of quantum theory and the concept of dark matter. "I found dark matter a very helpful metaphor, and I had my fingers crossed since 1993 that they wouldn't discover what it was before I finished. And they still haven't." Another theme is the nature of consciousness. He says that "Science is clearly a field where the imagination can be triumphant" but that there are things that lie beyond it: "I think a lot of the things that science is either dubious about or skeptical about or refuses to have anything to do with are these qualities which are so well expressed in literature or music or poetry or the visual arts. The sort of gung-ho triumphalist proponents of science will say 'That's because we haven't got there yet. We'll measure it, we'll do it one day. ... I'd point out, we've got there already. You read it in Shelley and Keats and Shakespeare, you hear it in Stravinsky and Debussy."

== Campaigns and views ==
Pullman has been a vocal campaigner on a number of issues related to books and politics.

=== Views on fantasy ===
In a lecture at the Sea of Faith conference, Pullman said that "the writers we call the greatest of all – Shakespeare, Tolstoy, Proust, George Eliot herself, are those who have created the most lifelike simulacra of real human beings in real human situations. In fact the more profound and powerful the imagination, the closer to reality are the forms it dreams up." He said he wanted to write fantasy realistically, or write fantastic characters with psychological depth: "Because when I thought about it, there was no reason why fantasy shouldn't be realistic, in a psychological sense – and it was the lack of that sort of realism that I objected to in the work of the big Tolkien and all the little Tolkiens." He says David Lindsay's A Voyage to Arcturus "shows that fantasy is capable of saying big and important things." He concludes that fantasy is "a great vehicle when it serves the purposes of realism, and a lot of old cobblers when it doesn't." Pullman says that he sees His Dark Materials as "stark realism", not fantasy. He has praised fantasy authors like Alan Garner.

=== Views on children's literature ===
Pullman believes that children deserve quality literature, and that there isn't a clear demarcation between children's and adult literature. In a talk at the Royal Society of Literature, he quoted C. S. Lewis in "On Three Ways of Writing for Children": "I now like hock, which I am sure I should not have liked as a child. But I still like lemon-squash. I call this growth or development because I have been enriched: where I formerly had only one pleasure, I now have two." Pullman said that: "It would be nice to think that normal human curiosity would let us open our minds to experience from every quarter, to listen to every storyteller in the marketplace. It would be nice too, occasionally, to read a review of an adult book that said, 'This book is so interesting, and so clearly and beautifully written, that children would enjoy it as well.'" He is an admirer of Philippa Pearce; when Pullman's Northern Lights won the Carnegie of Carnegies, Pearce's Tom's Midnight Garden was the runner-up. Pullman said: "Personally, I feel they got the initials right but not the name. I don't know if the result would be the same in a hundred years' time; maybe Philippa Pearce would win then". In 2011, Pullman gave the Philippa Pearce Lecture.

He is also an admirer of Leon Garfield, "someone who put the best of his imagination into everything he wrote", particularly praising The Pleasure Garden. In a lecture, he said that "one of the things we need to do for children is introduce them to the pleasures of the subtle and complex. One way to do that, of course, is to let them see us enjoying it, and then forbid them to touch it, on the grounds that it's too grown-up for them, their minds aren't ready to cope with it, it's too strong, it'll drive them mad with strange and uncontrollable desires. If that doesn't make them want to try it, nothing will."

=== Views on poetry ===
He writes: "The experience of reading poetry aloud when you don't fully understand it is a curious and complicated one. It's like suddenly discovering that you can play the organ. Rolling swells and peals of sound, powerful rhythms and rich harmonies are at your command; and as you utter them you begin to realise that the sound you're releasing from the words as you speak is part of the reason they're there. The sound is part of the meaning and that part only comes alive when you speak it. ... We need to remind ourselves of this, especially if we have anything to do with education. I have come across teachers and student teachers whose job was to teach poetry, but who thought that poetry was only a fancy way of dressing up simple statements to make them look complicated, and that their task was to help their pupils translate the stuff into ordinary English. ... No one had told such people that poetry is in fact enchantment; that it has the form it does because that very form casts a spell; and that when they thought they were bothered and bewildered, they were in fact being bewitched, and if they let themselves accept the enchantment and enjoy it, they would eventually understand much more about the poem." Of Elizabeth Bishop he writes: "How simple some great poetry can seem - as simple as water, and as necessary."

=== Views on fairy tales ===
He disagrees with Richard Dawkins that fairy tales would lead children to believe in magic. Citing evidence by Gordon Wells, he writes of the importance of reading to children: "My guess is that the kind of stories children are offered has far less effect on their development than whether they are given stories at all; and that children whose parents take the trouble to sit and read with them – and talk about the stories, not in a lecturing sort of way but genuinely conversing, in the way that Wells describes –will grow up to be much more fluent and confident not only with language but with pretty well any kind of intellectual activity, including science. And children who are deprived of this contact, this interaction, the world of stories, are not likely to flourish at all. What sort of evidence that is, I don't know, but I believe it."

=== Views on monarchy ===
In 2002, to coincide with the Golden Jubilee of Queen Elizabeth II, Pullman was interviewed for a feature in The Guardian on notable republicans. According to Pullman, "The present system is unsustainable, because it is cruel. No individual and no family should be subject to the pressures of publicity and expectation that have beset the Windsors." Expressing sympathy for the young Prince William, Pullman added, "we can't have a quiet, sensible, unobtrusive sort of monarchy because of the mistakes the Windsors have made, and because of the disgusting and unredeemable nature of the tabloid press; so we shall have to have a republic. The one thing to avoid is a political president. Let's have a well-respected figure from some other walk of life, and leave politics to the prime minister and parliament." In 2010, The Atlantic described Pullman's Jesus in The Good Man Jesus and the Scoundrel Christ as "a proper republican in the Pullman sense of the word: instinctively fraternal and anti-institutional, spreading his rough-and-ready enlightenments across the horizontal axis."

=== Age and gender labelling of books ===
In 2008, Pullman led a campaign against the introduction of age bands on the covers of children's books, saying: "It's based on a one-dimensional view of growth, which regards growing older as moving along a line like a monkey climbing a stick: now you're seven, so you read these books; and now you're nine so you read these." More than 1,200 authors, booksellers, illustrators, librarians and teachers joined the campaign; Pullman's own publisher, Scholastic, agreed to his request not to put the age bands on his book covers. Joel Rickett, deputy editor of The Bookseller, said: "The steps taken by Mr Pullman and other authors have taken the industry by surprise and I think these proposals are now in the balance."

In 2014, Pullman supported the Let Books Be Books campaign to stop children's books being labelled as "for girls" or "for boys", saying: "I'm against anything, from age-ranging to pinking and blueing, whose effect is to shut the door in the face of children who might enjoy coming in. No publisher should announce on the cover of any book the sort of readers the book would prefer. Let the readers decide for themselves."

=== Civil liberties ===
Pullman has a strong commitment to traditional British civil liberties and is noted for his criticism of growing state authority and government encroachment into everyday life. In February 2009, he was the keynote speaker at the Convention on Modern Liberty in London and wrote an extended piece in The Times condemning the Labour government for its attacks on basic civil rights. Later, he and other authors threatened to stop visiting schools in protest at new laws requiring them to be vetted to work with youngsters—though officials claimed that the laws had been misinterpreted.

=== Public jury ===
In July 2011, Pullman was one of the lead campaigners signing a declaration that called for a 1,000-strong "public jury", selected at random, to draw up a "public interest first" test to ensure that power was taken away from "remote interest groups". The declaration was also signed by 56 academics, writers, trade unionists and politicians from the Labour Party, the Liberal Democrats and the Green Party.

=== Library closures ===
In October 2011, Pullman backed a campaign to stop 600 library closures in England, calling it a "war against stupidity". London Borough of Brent claimed that it was closing half of its libraries to fulfil its "exciting plans" to improve its library service. Pullman said: "All the time, you see, the council had been longing to improve the library service, and the only thing standing in the way was – the libraries."

Speaking at a conference organised by The Library Campaign and Voices for the Library, he added:

The book is second only to the wheel as the best piece of technology human beings have ever invented. A book symbolises the whole intellectual history of mankind; it's the greatest weapon ever devised in the war against stupidity. Beware of anyone who tries to make books harder to get at. And that is exactly what these closures are going to do – oh, not intentionally, except in a few cases; very few people are stupid intentionally; but that will be the effect. Books will be harder to get at. Stupidity will gain a little ground.

=== Ebook library loans ===
In advance of becoming president of the Society of Authors in August 2013, Pullman led a call for authors to be fairly paid for ebook library loans. Under arrangements in force at the time, authors were paid 6p per library loan by the government for physical books, but nothing for ebook loans. In addition, the Society found that publishers had possibly been inadvertently underpaying authors for ebook loans. Altogether, this may have resulted in authors losing up to two-thirds of the income they would have received on the sale and loan of a physical book. Addressing this issue, Pullman said:

New media and new forms of buying and lending are all very interesting, for all kinds of reasons, but one principle remains unchanged: authors must be paid fairly for their work. Any arrangement that doesn't acknowledge that principle is a bad one, and needs to be changed. That is our whole argument.

=== William Blake's cottage and memorial stone ===
As a long-time enthusiast of William Blake, and president of the Blake Society, Pullman led a campaign in 2014 to buy the Sussex cottage where the poet lived between 1800 and 1803, saying:

Surely it isn't beyond the resources of a nation that can spend enormous amounts of money on acts of folly and unnecessary warfare, a nation that likes to boast about its literary heritage, to find the money to pay for a proper memorial and a centre for the study of this great poet and artist. Not least because this is the place where he wrote the words now often sung as an alternative (and better) national anthem, the poem known as Jerusalem: "And did those feet in ancient time". Blake's feet walked in Felpham. Let's not let this opportunity pass by.

As president of the Blake Society, on 11 August 2018, Pullman inaugurated Blake's new memorial gravestone on the site of his grave in Bunhill Fields, following a long campaign by the society.

=== Boycott of Brexit 50p coin ===
In January 2020, Pullman called for literate people to boycott the newly minted Brexit 50p coin due to the omission of the Oxford comma in its slogan "Peace, prosperity and friendship with all nations". The viewpoint was supported by some, while lexicographer Susie Dent indicated it was optional and Baroness Bakewell said she had been "taught that it was wrong to use the comma in such circumstances".

=== Presidency of the Society of Authors ===
In 2013, Pullman was elected President of the Society of Authors – the "ultimate honour" awarded by the British writers' body, and a position first held by Alfred, Lord Tennyson. In January 2016, Pullman resigned as patron of the Oxford Literary Festival in support of the Society of Authors' campaign for writers to be paid fees at festivals and drew attention to the poor remuneration of writers.

On 10 August 2021, Pullman tweeted a response to what he wrongly thought was criticism of Kate Clanchy's teaching memoir Some Kids I Taught and What They Taught Me. His tweet said that those who condemn a book without reading it would be at home with "Boko Haram and the Taliban." Pullman later deleted the tweet and apologised. On 11 August The Society of Authors put out a statement which was described by The Guardian as the society "distancing" itself from Pullman. Pullman resigned his presidency, stating that he would not have been free to express his personal opinions if he had remained. He later stated that the Society of Authors had become a "vehicle for gesture politics" and called for external review and reform of the organisation.

=== Israel-Palestine ===
Pullman has been a long-term vocal supporter of Palestinian rights.

In 2010, Pullman was a patron of the Palestine Festival of Literature, where he said "Every literary act, whether it is a great epic poem or an honest piece of journalism or a simple nonsense tale for children is a blow against the forces of stupidity and ignorance and darkness … The Palestine Festival of Literature exists to do just that – and I salute it for its work. Not only this year but for as long as it is necessary."

In June 2020, he signed an open letter calling for the end to Israel's annexation of the West Bank. In 2024, Pullman expressed concern at the Royal Society of Literature's alleged 'censorship' of Israeli criticism in its magazine. In December 2025, Pullman was one of over 200 cultural figures that signed an open letter calling for the release of jailed Palestinian leader Marwan Barghouti.

== Perspective on religion ==
Pullman speaks of replacing The Kingdom of Heaven with "The Republic of Heaven":

We have to realize that our human nature demands meaning and joy just as Jane Eyre demanded love and kindness ("You think we can live without them, but we cannot live so"); to accept that this meaning and joy will involve a passionate love of the physical world, this world, of food and drink and sex and music and laughter, and not a suspicion and hatred of it; to understand that it will both grow out of and add to the achievements of the human mind such as science and art. ... In the republic, we're connected in a moral way to one another, to other human beings. We have responsibilities to them, and they to us. We're not isolated units of self-interest in a world where there is no such thing as society; we cannot live so."

He writes of a myth for the republic:

"Of course, there are two kinds of why, and our story must deal with both. There's the one that asks What brought us here? and the other that asks What are we here for? One looks back, and the other looks forward, perhaps. And in offering an answer to the first why, a republican myth must accept the overwhelmingly powerful evidence for evolution by natural selection. The neo-Darwinians tell us that the processes of life are blind and automatic; there has been no purpose in our coming here. Well, I think a republican response to that would be: there is now. We are conscious, and conscious of our own consciousness. We might have arrived at this point by a series of accidents, but from now on we have to take charge of our fate. Now we are here, now we are conscious, we make a difference. Our presence changes everything. So a myth of the republic of Heaven would explain what our true purpose is. Our purpose is to understand and to help others to understand, to explore, to speculate, to imagine. And that purpose has a moral force."

In The Chronicles of Narnia, he objects to Susan's exclusion from Narnia because of her interest in "lipstick and nylons and invitations.": "In other words, normal human development, which includes a growing awareness of your body and its effect on the opposite sex, is something from which Lewis's narrative, and what he would like us to think is the Kingdom of Heaven, turns with horror. The ending of The Last Battle makes this position even clearer. 'The term is over: the holidays have begun,' says Aslan to the children, having just let them know that 'there was a real railway accident....Your father and mother and all of you are — as you used to call it in the Shadowlands — dead.' Using Narnia as our moral compass, we can take it as axiomatic that in the republic of Heaven, people do not regard life in this world as so worthless and contemptible that they leave it with pleasure and relief, and a railway accident is not an end-of-term treat." He adds, "It's not the presence of Christian doctrine I object to so much as the absence of Christian virtue. The highest virtue - we have on the authority of the New Testament itself - is love, and yet you find not a trace of that in the books."

Although Pullman has stated he is "a Church of England atheist, and a 1662 Book of Common Prayer atheist, because that's the tradition I was brought up in", he has also said he is technically an agnostic. He has singled out elements of Christianity for criticism: "if there is a God, and he is as the Christians describe him, then he deserves to be put down and rebelled against." He has also acknowledged that the same could be said of all religions.

Pullman has also referred to himself as knowingly "of the Devil's party", a reference to William Blake's revisionist view of Milton in The Marriage of Heaven and Hell. Pullman is a supporter of Humanists UK and an Honorary Associate of the National Secular Society. In 2011, he was given a services to Humanism award by the British Humanist Association for his contribution as a longstanding supporter.

On 15 September 2010, Pullman, along with 54 other public figures (including Stephen Fry, Professor Richard Dawkins, Terry Pratchett, Jonathan Miller and Ken Follett), signed an open letter published in The Guardian stating their opposition to Pope Benedict XVI being given "the honour of a state visit" to the UK; the letter argued that the Pope had led and condoned global abuses of human rights, leading a state which has "resisted signing many major human rights treaties and has formed its own treaties ("concordats") with many states which negatively affect the human rights of citizens of those states".

Laura Miller described Pullman as one of England's most outspoken atheists. He has characterised atheist totalitarian regimes as religions.

Alan Jacobs (of Wheaton College) said that in His Dark Materials Pullman replaced the theist world-view of John Milton's Paradise Lost with a Rousseauist one.

The books in the series have been criticised for their attitude to religion, especially Catholicism, by the Catholic League for Religious and Civil Rights and Focus on the Family. Writing in the Catholic Herald in 1999, Leonie Caldecott cited Pullman's work as an example of fiction "far more worthy of the bonfire than Harry [Potter]" on the grounds that

"[by] co-opting Catholic terminology and playing with Judaeo-Christian theological concepts, Pullman is effectively removing, among a mass audience of a highly impressionable age, some of the building blocks for future evangelisation".

Pullman was flattered and asked his publisher to include quotes from Caldecott's article in his next book. In 2002, the Catholic Herald published an article by Sarah Johnson that compared Pullman to a "playground bully" whose work "attacks a religious minority". The following year, after Benedict Allen's reference to the criticism during the BBC TV series The Big Read, the Catholic Herald republished both articles and Caldecott claimed her "bonfire" comment was a joke and accused Pullman and his supporters of quoting her out of context. In a longer article for Touchstone magazine earlier in 2003, Caldecott had also described Pullman's work as "axe-grinding" and "a kind of Luciferian enterprise".

Columnist Peter Hitchens, in a 2002 article for The Mail on Sunday, accused Pullman of "killing god" and described him as "the most dangerous author in Britain" because he said in an interview: "I'm trying to undermine the basis of Christian belief." Pullman responded by posting Hitchens' article on his study wall. In that interview, which was for a February 2001 article in The Washington Post, Pullman acknowledged that a controversy would be likely to boost sales, but continued: "I'm not in the business of offending people. I find the books upholding certain values that I think are important, such as life is immensely valuable and this world is an extraordinarily beautiful place. We should do what we can to increase the amount of wisdom in the world." Hitchens also views the His Dark Materials series as a direct rebuttal of C. S. Lewis's The Chronicles of Narnia; Hitchens' brother Christopher Hitchens, author of God Is Not Great, praised His Dark Materials as a fresh alternative to Lewis, J. R. R. Tolkien and J. K. Rowling, describing the author as one "whose books have begun to dissolve the frontier between adult and juvenile fiction" However, he was more critical of The Good Man Jesus and the Scoundrel Christ, accusing Pullman of being a "Protestant atheist" for supporting the teachings of Christ but being critical of organised religion.

Pullman has found support from some Christians, most notably Rowan Williams, the former Archbishop of Canterbury, who argued that Pullman's attacks focus on the constraints and dangers of dogmatism and the use of religion to oppress, not on Christianity itself. Williams recommended His Dark Materials for discussion in religious education classes, and said that "to see large school-parties in the audience of the Pullman plays at the National Theatre is vastly encouraging". Pullman and Williams took part in a National Theatre platform debate a few days later to discuss myth, religious experience and its representation in the arts.

Donna Freitas, professor of religion at Boston University, argued that challenges to traditional images of God should be welcomed as part of a "lively dialogue about faith". The Christian writers Kurt Bruner and Jim Ware "also uncover spiritual themes within the books". Pullman's contribution to the Canongate Myth series, The Good Man Jesus and the Scoundrel Christ, was described by Mike Collett-White as "a far more direct exploration of the foundations of Christianity and the church as well as an examination of the fascination and power of storytelling".

In a 2017 interview with The Times, Pullman said: "The place religion has in our lives is a permanent one." He concluded that there was "no point in condemning [religion]", and mused that it is part of the human mind to ask philosophical questions such as the purpose of life. He reiterated that it was useless to "become censorious about [religion], to say there is no God". He also mentioned that The Book of Dust is based on the "extreme danger of putting power into the hands of those who believe in some absolute creed, whether that is Christianity or Islam or Marxism". He says "The Bible is the most wonderful book – I wouldn't be without it. It's a library of all kinds of stories: poetry, history, mythology, crazy ravings. It's got it all. Not much humour in it, though."

== Personal life ==
In October 2009, he became a patron of the Palestine Festival of Literature. He is also a patron of the Shakespeare Schools Festival, a charity that enables school children across the UK to perform Shakespeare in professional theatres.

A lifelong fan of Norwich City, Pullman penned the foreword to the club's official history, published in 2020. He is an art lover, and wrote an appreciation of Édouard Manet's A Bar at the Folies-Bergère. He is a devotee of Johann Sebastian Bach, and appeared in John Eliot Gardiner's documentary Bach: A Passionate Life. He muses "Such splendour and wonderfulness would, on its own, convince me that there was a God if I felt inclined to take that conclusion." He is a film lover, and says his favourite film is The Magnificent Seven.

He is an admirer of MacDonald Harris, "someone who attends to every aspect of the words they're using, not least their weight, their rhythm and their colour." He is a fan of Norman Lindsay's The Magic Pudding, which he calls "the funniest children's book ever written". He says his favourite book is probably Robert Burton's The Anatomy of Melancholy, describing it as "a funny book about depression written in a very prolix, ornate style." Among contemporary authors, he admires John le Carré: "compared to him, I'm just a child."

== Recognition, awards, and honours ==
Pullman was a joint-winner of the New English Library's Young Writer's Award in 1972.

Northern Lights was published in 1995 (entitled The Golden Compass in the U.S., 1996). Pullman won both the annual Carnegie Medal and the Guardian Children's Fiction Prize, a similar award that authors may not win twice.

In 2001 he was elected a Fellow of the Royal Society of Literature.

He was awarded a CBE in the New Year's Honours list in 2004. In the same year, he was elected president of the Blake Society.

He was awarded an honorary doctorate in Letters from the University of East Anglia in 2003.

In a 2004 BBC poll, he was named the eleventh most influential person in British culture.

In 2005, Pullman won the annual Astrid Lindgren Memorial Award from the Swedish Arts Council, recognising his career contribution to "children's and young adult literature in the broadest sense". According to the presentation, "Pullman radically injects new life into fantasy by introducing a variety of alternative worlds and by allowing good and evil to become ambiguous." In every genre, "he combines storytelling and psychological insight of the highest order."

In 2006, he was one of five finalists for the biennial, international Hans Christian Andersen Medal, and he was the British nominee again in 2012.

Pullman was awarded an honorary degree from the University of Dundee in June 2007. He received the degree at the inaugural Dundee Literary Festival, where he was a featured author.

On 23 November 2007, Pullman was made an honorary professor at Bangor University.

In 2008, The Times named Pullman one of the "50 greatest British writers since 1945". He was also awarded the International Humanist Award by the American Humanist Association the same year.

On 24 June 2009, Pullman was awarded the degree of D.Litt. (Doctor of Letters), honoris causa, by the University of Oxford at the Encænia ceremony in the Sheldonian Theatre.

In 2013, he was awarded an honorary doctorate by the University of Bath.

Pullman was named a Knight Bachelor in the 2019 New Year's Honours list.

In March 2019, the charity Action for Children's Art presented Pullman with their annual J. M. Barrie Award to mark a "lifetime's achievement in delighting children".

== Bibliography ==
=== Young adult novels ===
==== His Dark Materials trilogy ====
1. Northern Lights (retitled The Golden Compass in the US) (1995)
2. The Subtle Knife (1997)
3. The Amber Spyglass (2000)

==== The Book of Dust trilogy ====
1. La Belle Sauvage (2017)
2. The Secret Commonwealth (2019)
3. The Rose Field (2025)

==== Companion books ====
- Lyra's Oxford (2003), novella, set after The Amber Spyglass
- Once Upon a Time in the North (2008), novella, prequel to Northern Lights
- The Collectors (2014), short story, set between La Belle Sauvage and Northern Lights, first published as an audiobook and on Kindle, then hardcover (2022) ISBN 978-0593378342
- Serpentine (2020), novella, set after The Amber Spyglass
- The Imagination Chamber (2022), companion, scenes from the His Dark Materials trilogy

==== Sally Lockhart series ====
1. The Ruby in the Smoke (1985)
2. The Shadow in the North, first published as The Shadow in the Plate (1986)
3. The Tiger in the Well (1990)
4. The Tin Princess (1994)

==== Stand-alones ====
- How to Be Cool (1987)
- The Broken Bridge (1990)
- The White Mercedes (1992), re-issued as The Butterfly Tattoo (1998)

=== Children's novels ===
==== The New-Cut Gang series ====
1. Thunderbolt's Waxwork (1994)
2. The Gas-Fitters' Ball (1995)

==== Stand-alones ====
- Count Karlstein (1982)
- Spring-Heeled Jack (1989)
- I was a Rat! or The Scarlet Slippers (1999)
- The Scarecrow and his Servant (2004)

=== Other novels ===
- The Haunted Storm (1972)
- Galatea (1976)
- The Good Man Jesus and the Scoundrel Christ (2010), novella, part of the Canongate Myth series

=== Children's short stories ===
Novellas:

- The Firework-Maker's Daughter (1995)
- Clockwork, or All Wound Up (1996)

Collections:

- Fairy Tales From The Brothers Grimm (2012), collection of 50 short stories

=== Picture books ===
- The Wonderful Story of Aladdin and the Enchanted Lamp (1993)
- Mossycoat (1998)
- Puss in Boots: The Adventures of That Most Enterprising Feline (2000)

=== Comics ===
- The Adventures of John Blake (2008), in The DFC and The Phoenix, with artwork by Fred Fordham. Mystery of the Ghost Ship storyline collected by David Fickling Books and in hardcover by Scholastic Inc.

=== Plays ===
- Frankenstein (1990)
- Sherlock Holmes and the Limehouse Horror (1992)

=== Non-fiction ===
- Ancient Civilizations (1978), history ISBN 978-0-08-021920-2
- Using the Oxford Junior Dictionary (1978), guide ISBN 978-0-19-910324-9
- Daemon Voices: Essays on Storytelling (2017), essays ISBN 978-1-910200-96-4

== Adaptations ==
=== Screen adaptations ===
- How To Be Cool was adapted for television in the United Kingdom by Granada Television for ITV, and starred Roger Daltrey and Freddie Jones. Three 50-minute episodes were broadcast between 3–17 December 1988.
- A TV mini-series, I Was a Rat, was produced by the BBC and aired in three one-hour instalments in 2001.
- A film adaptation of The Butterfly Tattoo finished principal photography on 30 September 2007. The Butterfly Tattoo is a project, supported by Philip Pullman, to allow young artists a chance to gain experience in the film industry. The film is produced by the Dutch production company Dynamic Entertainment.
- A co-produced BBC and WGBH Boston television adaptation of The Ruby in the Smoke, starring Billie Piper and Julie Walters, was shown in the UK on BBC One on 27 December 2006, and broadcast on PBS Masterpiece Theatre in America on 4 February 2007. The television adaptation of the second book in the series, The Shadow in the North, was shown on the BBC on 26 December 2007. The BBC and WGBH announced plans to adapt the next two Sally Lockhart novels, The Tiger in the Well and The Tin Princess, for television as well; however, since The Shadow in the North was shown in 2007, no information has been released regarding an adaptation of The Tiger in the Well.
- A film adaptation of Northern Lights, titled The Golden Compass, was released in December 2007 by New Line Cinema, starring Dakota Blue Richards as Lyra, along with Daniel Craig, Nicole Kidman, Eva Green, Sam Elliott and Ian McKellen.
- The TV series His Dark Materials, based on the trilogy of novels of the same name, was produced by the BBC and HBO. Its broadcast began on BBC One on 3 November 2019, and it concluded after three seasons on 5 December 2022.

=== Stage adaptations ===
- London's Royal National Theatre staged a two-part theatrical version of His Dark Materials in December 2003. The same adaptation has since been staged by several other theatres in the UK and elsewhere.
- His Dark Materials has also been adapted for radio, CD and unabridged audiobook; the unabridged audiobooks were narrated by the author.
- The Ruby In The Smoke was adapted for the stage by Reprint (now Escapade) Productions. The adaptation was written and directed by Madeleine Perham, and toured the UK in 2016, including a run at the Edinburgh Festival, finishing at the Brighton Fringe in 2017.
- The Firework-Maker's Daughter was adapted into an opera, with music by David Bruce and a libretto by Glyn Maxwell. The production was premiered by the Opera Group in the UK in 2013. Pullman wrote of the opera that it was "one of the best treatments a story of [his had] ever received."

== Visual Artwork ==
For the "Lantern Slides" editions of the His Dark Materials books, Pullman contributed one illustration for each chapter of the trilogy. Initially the publisher inquired if there shouldn't be a decorative element at the head of each chapter, to which Pullman agreed, but campaigned for a unique image for each chapter rather than repeating the same. Pullman reports, "I then asked if I could draw them. 'But you're not an artist', he (his publisher) pointed out. I said I could draw, and he challenged me to prove it. So I went away and had a go. I knew the illustrations would be reproduced very small, but after some experimenting I found a way of doing it that involved solid blacks that wouldn't get lost in the printing."

In 2023, these illustrations were published as fine art limited-edition letterpress prints by Electric Works in San Francisco, California. Editions were limited to 100 of eighteen different individual images. In addition, a broadside comprising all 76 chapters of the entire trilogy was also published in an edition of 250.
