= Andy Rowley =

British television producer (born 1959)

Andy Rowley (born 28 December 1959; Preston, Lancashire) is a British television producer known for his children's dramas, including Jeopardy, which won a BAFTA Award for best children's drama in 2002, and Microsoap, Prix Jeunesse winner and BAFTA best children's drama award winner in 1999. Rowley was a BBC Production Manager (notably on Lovejoy) who went on to produce the last TV script written by Malcolm Bradbury, "Foreign Bodies" for Dalziel and Pascoe and many memorable TV dramas including Loved Up, Sherlock Holmes and the Baker Street Irregulars, Uncle Max, I Was a Rat, and Scene, as well being a UK producer on the French feature film L'Isle Aux Tresors.

Rowley has worked with some of the UK's best directing and acting talent, including: Michael Winterbottom, Peter Howitt, Brenda Fricker, Adrian Lester, Sean Maguire, Jonathan Pryce, Bill Paterson and Aaron Johnson and is known for his script development, budgeting skills, and work on international co-productions, as well as comedy, and long form family dramas. He has also written and directed short films.

He was educated at Marple Grammar School in Stockport, Bangor University and the University of Manchester.
