= Martin Landau filmography =

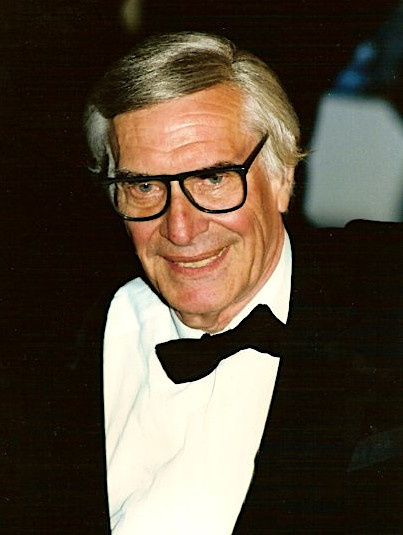
Landau at the 1995 Cannes Film Festival

Martin Landau (1928–2017) was an American film and television actor. On television, Landau's most notable roles were that of Rollin Hand in Mission: Impossible (1966–1969) and as Commander John Koenig in the science fiction series Space: 1999 (1975–1977). On film, Landau appeared in notable films such as North by Northwest (1959), Tucker: The Man and His Dream (1988) and Crimes and Misdemeanors (1989).

Landau won an Academy Award for Best Supporting Actor for his role as Bela Lugosi in Tim Burton's Ed Wood (1994).

== Filmography ==
=== Film ===
Year	Title	Role	Notes
1959	Pork Chop Hill	Lt. Russell	
1959	North by Northwest	Leonard	
1959	The Gazebo	The Duke	
1962	Stagecoach to Dancers' Rock	Dade Coleman	
1963	Cleopatra	Rufio	
1963	Decision at Midnight	Nils	
1965	The Greatest Story Ever Told	Caiaphas	
1965	The Hallelujah Trail	Chief Walks-Stooped-Over	
1966	Nevada Smith	Jesse Coe	
1970	Operation Snafu	Joe Mellone	
1970	They Call Me Mister Tibbs!	Logan Sharpe	
1971	A Town Called Bastard	The Colonel	
1972	Black Gunn	Capelli	
1976	Strange Shadows in an Empty Room	Dr. George Tracer	
1979	The Last Word	Captain Garrity	
1979	Meteor	Major General Adlon	
1980	Without Warning	Fred "Sarge" Dobbs	
1980	The Return	Niles Buchanan	
1982	Alone in the Dark	Byron "Preacher" Sutcliff	
1983	The Being	Garson Jones	
1983	Trial by Terror		
1984	Access Code	Agency Head	
1984	Terror in the Aisles	Byron "Preacher" Sutcliff	Archive footage
1985	Treasure Island	Old Captain	
1987	Sweet Revenge	Cicero	
1987	Empire State	Chuck	
1987	Cyclone	Bosarian	
1987	Delta Fever	Bud	
1987	W.A.R.: Women Against Rape	Judge Shaw	
1988	Real Bullets	Sallini	
1988	Run If You Can	Curt Malvani	
1988	Tucker: The Man and His Dream	Abe Karatz	Chicago Film Critics Association Award for Best Supporting Actor; Golden Globe Award for Best Supporting Actor – Motion Picture; Kansas City Film Critics Circle Award for Best Supporting Actor (shared with Tom Cruise and Dean Stockwell); Nominated—Academy Award for Best Supporting Actor; Nominated—Los Angeles Film Critics Association Award for Best Supporting Actor; Nominated—New York Film Critics Circle Award for Best Supporting Actor
1989	Paint It Black	Daniel Lambert	
1989	Crimes and Misdemeanors	Judah Rosenthal	Nominated—Academy Award for Best Supporting Actor; Nominated—Chicago Film Critics Association Award for Best Actor; Nominated—Los Angeles Film Critics Association Award for Best Supporting Actor
1990	By Dawn’s Early Light	The US President	
1990	The Color of Evening	Max Loeb	
1991	Firehead	Admiral Pendleton	
1992	Mistress	Jack Roth	
1993	No Place to Hide	Frank McCoy	
1993	Eye of the Stranger	Mayor Howard Bains	
1993	Sliver	Alex Parsons	
1993	12:01	Dr. Thadius Moxley	
1994	Time Is Money	Mac	
1994	Intersection	Neal	
1994	Ed Wood	Bela Lugosi	Academy Award for Best Supporting Actor; American Comedy Award for Funniest Supporting Actor in a Motion Picture; Boston Society of Film Critics Award for Best Supporting Actor; Chicago Film Critics Association Award for Best Supporting Actor; Dallas-Fort Worth Film Critics Association Award for Best Supporting Actor; Golden Globe Award for Best Supporting Actor – Motion Picture; Los Angeles Film Critics Association Award for Best Supporting Actor; National Society of Film Critics Award for Best Supporting Actor; New York Film Critics Circle Award for Best Supporting Actor; Saturn Award for Best Actor; Screen Actors Guild Award for Outstanding Performance by a Male Actor in a Supporting Role; Society of Texas Film Critics Award for Best Supporting Actor; Southeastern Film Critics Association Award for Best Supporting Actor; Nominated—BAFTA Award for Best Actor in a Supporting Role
1996	City Hall	Judge Walter Stern	
1996	The Adventures of Pinocchio	Geppetto	
1996	The Elevator	Roy Tilden	
1997	B*A*P*S	Mr. Donald Blakemore	
1997	Legend of the Spirit Dog	Storyteller	Voice
1998	The X-Files	Alvin Kurtzweil, M.D.	
1998	Rounders	Abe Petrovsky	
1999	EDtv	Al	
1999	The Joyriders	Gordon Trout	
1999	The New Adventures of Pinocchio	Geppetto	
1999	Sleepy Hollow	Peter Van Garrett	Uncredited
1999	Carlo's Wake	Carlo Torello	
2000	Ready to Rumble	Sal Bandini	
2000	Very Mean Men	Mr. White	
2000	Shiner	Frank Spedding	
2001	The Majestic	Harry Trimble	
2003	Hollywood Homicide	Jerry Duran	
2003	The Commission	Senator Richard Russell	
2003	Wake	Older Sebastian Riven	
2003	2004	The Aryan Couple	Joseph Krauzenberg
2005	Film Trix	Himself	
2006	Love Made Easy	Don Farinelli Sr.	
2006	An Existential Affair	The Wedding Doctor	
2008	David & Fatima	Rabbi Schmulic	
2008	Lovely, Still	Robert Malone	
2008	Harrison Montgomery	Harrison Montgomery	
2008	City of Ember	Sul	
2008	Billy: The Early Years	Older Charles Templeton	
2009	9	2	Voice
2009	Remembering Nigel	Himself	
2010	Ivory	Leon Spencer	
2010	Finding Grandma	Doc Fine	Short
2011	Mysteria	Hotel Manager	
2012	Frankenweenie	Mr. Rzykruski	Voice
2015	Entourage	Bob Ryan	
2015	Remember	Max Rosenbaum	
2016	The Red Maple Leaf	Bernard Florence	
2017	Abe & Phil's Last Poker Game	Dr. Abe Mandelbaum	
2019	Love, Antosha	Himself	Documentary, posthumous release
2022	Without Ward	Ward	Shot in 2012, posthumous release

=== Television ===
Year	Title	Role	Notes
1957	Harbourmaster	First Mate	Episode: "Sanctuary"
1958	Lawman	Bob Ford	Episode: "The Outcast"
1958	Sugarfoot	Jim Kelly	Episode: "The Ghost"
1958	Gunsmoke	Thorp	Episode: "The Patsy"
1959	The Lawless Years	Silva	Episode: "Lucky Silva"
1959	The Twilight Zone	Dan Hotaling	Episode: "Mr. Denton on Doomsday"
1959	Johnny Staccato	Jerry Lindstrom	Episode: "Murder for Credit"
1959	Tales of Wells Fargo	Doc Holliday	Episode: "Doc Holliday"
1960	Tate	John Chess	Episode: "Tigrero"
1960	Johnny Ringo	Wes Tymon	Episode: "The Derelict"
1960	The Islanders	Arnie	Episode: "Duel of Strangers"
1960	Adventures in Paradise	Sackett	Episode: "Nightmare on Nakupa"
1960	Wagon Train	Preacher	Episode: "The Cathy Eckhart Story"
1961	Adventures in Paradise	Miller	Episode: "Mr. Flotsam"
1961	Bonanza	Emeliano	Episode: "The Gift"
1961	The Rifleman	Miguel	Episode: "The Vaqueros"
1961	The Tall Man	Francisco	Episode: "Dark Moment"
1961	The Law and Mr. Jones		Episode: "Lincoln"
1961	The Detectives Starring Robert Taylor	Vince Treynor	Episode: "Shadow of His Brother"
1962	The Tall Man	Father Gueschim	Episode: "The Black Robe"
1963	The Travels of Jaimie McPheeters	Cochio	Episode: "The Day of the Killer"
1963	Mr. Novak	Victor Rand	Episode: "Pay the Two Dollars"
1963	The Outer Limits	Andro	Episode: "The Man Who Was Never Born"
1964	The Defenders	Dr. Daniel Orren	Episode: "The Secret"
1964	The Outer Limits	Richard Bellero	Episode: "The Bellero Shield"
1964	The Greatest Show on Earth	Mario de Mona	Episode: "The Night the Monkey Died"
1964	The Twilight Zone	Major Ivan Kuchenko	Episode: "The Jeopardy Room"
1964	The Alfred Hitchcock Hour	Edward 'Ned' Murray	Season 2 Episode 30: "Second Verdict"
1964	Special for Women: A Child in Danger	William Olsen	Television film
1964	The Ghost of Sierra de Cobre	Nelson Orion	Television film
1965	Mr. Novak	Robert Coolidge	Episode: "Enter a Strange Animal"
1965	A Man Called Shenandoah	Jace Miller	Episode: "The Locket"
1965	I Spy	Danny Preston	Episode: "Danny Was a Million Laughs"
1965	The Wild Wild West	George Grimm	Episone: "The Night of the Red Eyed Madman"
1965	The Big Valley	Mariano Montoya	Episode: "The Way to Kill a Killer"
1966	Branded	Edwin Booth	Episode: "This Stage of Fools"
1966	The Man from U.N.C.L.E.	Count Zark	Episode: "The Bat Cave Affair"
1966	Gunsmoke	Britton	Episode: "The Goldtakers"
1966–1969	Mission: Impossible	Rollin Hand	76 episodes Golden Globe Award for Best Actor – Television Series Drama; Nominated—Primetime Emmy Award for Outstanding Lead Actor in a Drama Series (1967–1969)
1969	Get Smart	Max's new face	Episode: "Pheasant Under Glass"
1972	Welcome Home, Johnny Bristol	Johnny Bristol	Television film
1973	Savage	Paul Savage	Television film
1973	Columbo	Dexter Paris / Norman Paris	Episode: "Double Shock"
1975–1977	Space: 1999	Commander John Koenig	47 episodes
1979	The Fall of the House of Usher	Roderick Usher	Television film
1979	The Death of Ocean View Park	Tom Flood	Television film
1981	The Harlem Globetrotters on Gilligan's Island	J.J. Pierson	Television film
1983	Matt Houston	Marquis Duval Sr.	Episode: "The Hunted"
1983	Hotel	Russell Slocum	Episode: "Confrontations"
1984	Buffalo Bill	Hayden Stone	Episode: "Company Ink"
1984	Murder, She Wrote	Al Drake	Episode: "Birds of a Feather"
1985	The Twilight Zone	William Cooper-Janes	Episode: "The Beacon"
1986	Kung Fu: The Movie	John Martin Perkins III	Television film
1986	Blacke's Magic	Broderick	Episode: "Last Flight from Moscow"
1987	Alfred Hitchcock Presents	Wallace Garrison	Episode: "The Final Twist"
1987	The Return of the Six Million Dollar Man and the Bionic Woman	Lyle Stenning	Television film
1989	The Neon Empire	Max Loeb	Television film
1990	Max and Helen	Simon Wiesenthal	Television film Nominated—CableACE Award for Supporting Actor in a Movie or Miniseries
1990	By Dawn's Early Light	President of the United States	Television film Nominated—CableACE Award for Actor in a Movie or Miniseries
1992	Legacy of Lies	Abraham Resnick	Television film CableACE Award for Supporting Actor in a Movie or Miniseries
1993	12:01	Dr. Thadius Moxley	Television film
1995–1996	Spider-Man: The Animated Series	The Scorpion / Mac Gargan	Voice, 4 episodes
1995	Joseph	Jacob	Television film
1999	Bonanno: A Godfather's Story	Joseph Bonanno (age 94)	Television film
2000	In the Beginning	Abraham	2 episodes
2001	Haven	Papa Gruber	Television film
2002	Corsairs		Television film
2004–2009	Without a Trace	Frank Malone	5 episodes Nominated—Primetime Emmy Award for Outstanding Guest Actor in a Drama Series (2004–2005)
2006	The Evidence	Dr. Sol Gold	8 episodes
2006–2008	Entourage	Bob Ryan	4 episodes Nominated—Primetime Emmy Award for Outstanding Guest Actor in a Comedy Series (2007)
2009	In Plain Sight	Joseph Thomas/Joseph Tancredi	Episode: "Training Video"
2011	The Simpsons	The Great Raymondo	Voice, Episode: "The Great Simpsina"
2011	Have a Little Faith	Rabbi Albert Lewis	Television film
2013	The Anna Nicole Story	J. Howard Marshall II	Television film
2014	Outlaw Prophet: Warren Jeffs	Rulon Jeffs	Television film
