= TBS =

TBS may stand for:

== Broadcasting ==
- Taipei Broadcasting Station, a radio station in Taipei, Taiwan
- TBS Holdings (formerly Tokyo Broadcasting System), a stock holding company in Tokyo, Japan
  - TBS Television (Japan), a television station
  - TBS Radio, a radio station
  - BS-TBS, a Japanese satellite television channel
- Turner Broadcasting System, media company in the United States
  - TBS (American TV channel), a cable television channel in the United States
  - TBS (Latin American TV channel), a defunct Latin American channel
- Traffic Broadcasting System, a radio and television broadcaster in Seoul, South Korea

== Entertainment ==
- Taking Back Sunday, an American rock band from Long Island, New York
- The Burbank Studios, a 1972, Warner Bros. joint venture with Columbia Pictures on the Warner Bros. Studios Burbank lot

== Education ==
- TBS Education, France. The Grande école formerly known as: Toulouse Business School
- Tau Beta Sigma, an honorary band sorority
- The Basic School, US Marine Corps
- Therapeutic boarding school

== Transport ==
- Tbilisi International Airport, an airport in Georgia, IATA code
- Terminal Bersepadu Selatan, transportation terminal in Kuala Lumpur, Malaysia

== Office products ==
- Toshiba Business Solutions, a US-based subsidiary of Toshiba TEC Corporation

== Other uses ==
- Tablespoonful as a unit of measure, tbs
- Tafawa Balewa Square, Lagos, Nigeria
- Talk Between Ships, short range VHF radio; see Charles Momsen#World War II
- The Bethesda system, for reporting cervical cytologic diagnoses
- TBS GB, a UK healthcare services company
- Trabecular bone score, a measure of bone health
- Treasury Board Secretariat, the administrative branch of the Treasury Board of Canada
- Tris-buffered saline, a biochemical buffer
- Temple Beth Sholom (Cherry Hill, New Jersey), a synagogue
- Turn-based strategy game, in which players take turns
- Tert-butyldimethylsilyl group of silyl ethers; see Tert-Butyldimethylsilyl chloride
- Tanguat language, ISO 639-3 code tbs
- Trinitarian Bible Society
- Thomas Brodie-Sangster, a British actor, abbreviated TBS
- Thomas Bywater Smithies, who published under the initials T. B. S.
- Torneo Superior de Baloncesto, a Dominican basketball tournament
- Townes–Brocks syndrome, a rare genetic condition
- The Business Standard, a Bangladeshi newspaper
- True Buddha School, a new religious movement
