= Have a Little Faith =

Have a Little Faith may refer to:

== Musical works ==
- "Have a Little Faith" (David Houston song), 1968
- "Have a Little Faith in Me", a 1987 song by John Hiatt, covered by Mandy Moore in 2003
- Have a Little Faith (Bill Frisell album), 1992
- Have a Little Faith (Joe Cocker album), 1994
- "Have a Little Faith (In Us)", sometimes known as "Have a Little Faith", a song by John Farnham
- "Have a Little Faith", a 2003 song by Gotthard from the album Human Zoo
- Have a Little Faith (Mavis Staples album), 2004
- Have a Little Faith, a 2006 album by Beverley Mahood

== Books, TV and film ==
- Have a Little Faith (book), a 2009 non-fiction book by Mitch Albom
- Have a Little Faith (film), a 2011 Hallmark Hall of Fame television movie
- Have a Little Faith (TV series), a 2017 Singaporean TV series
