= Have a Little Faith (film) =

- Genre: Drama
- Written by: Mitch Albom
- Directed by: Jon Avnet
- Starring: Laurence Fishburne; Bradley Whitford; Martin Landau
- Theme music composer: Ed Shearmur
- Country of origin: United States
- Original language: English

Production
- Executive producers: Mitch Albom; Jon Avnet; Brent Shields
- Producer: Andrew Gottlieb
- Cinematography: Denis Lenoir
- Editor: Patrick J. Don Vito
- Running time: 100 minutes
- Production company: Hallmark Hall of Fame

Original release
- Network: ABC
- Release: November 27, 2011

Related
- Beyond the Blackboard; A Smile as Big as the Moon

Have a Little Faith is a 2011 Hallmark Hall of Fame made-for-television drama film. The film is based on Detroit Free Press columnist Mitch Albom’s best-selling nonfiction book of the same name.

== Plot ==
Writer Mitch Albom is asked to write the eulogy for his childhood rabbi but is reluctant to do so.

== Cast ==
- Laurence Fishburne as Henry Covington
- Martin Landau as Rabbi Albert L. Lewis
- Bradley Whitford as Mitch Albom

== Filming ==
The film was made in and around the state of Michigan.

== Broadcast ==
The film debuted on ABC on November 27, 2011, as the first Hallmark Hall of Fame film broadcast since CBS cancelled the series earlier in 2011. It was the first Hallmark Hall of Fame film broadcast on ABC since 1995.

== Ratings ==
On its November 27, 2011, broadcast, the film earned a 1.1 rating among adults aged 18 to 49, the lowest rating among all programs on the four major networks that night. The total number of viewers was estimated at 6.5 million, compared to 13.5 million for the Hallmark Hall of Fame presentation of November Christmas on the weekend after Thanksgiving in 2010.
