= Brent Shields =

American television and film producer and director

Brent Shields (March 1, 1963) is an American television and film producer and director. Many of his films have been made in conjunction with the Hallmark Hall of Fame, and most were made for television, family-oriented "feel good" stories.

== Early life ==
Brent Shields was born in Woodland Hills, CA. His family later moved to Huntington Beach, CA, where Shields graduated from Fountain Valley High School in '81. Shields earned his Bachelor's of Science degree, Telecommunications & Film, from San Diego State University in '87. Shields married Jayne Macomber in '88 and resides in Pasadena, CA. The couple has one daughter, Jill Shields. Shields has five siblings.

== Career ==
In his role as producer of over 80 films, Brent has successfully adapted for television such classic works as William Faulkner's Old Man, Thomas Hardy's Return of the Native, Oscar Wilde's The Canterville Ghost as well as contemporary works by such acclaimed writers as August Wilson, John Grisham, Pat Conroy, Anne Tyler, Richard Paul Evans, E.L. Konigsburg, and Norman McLean. Shields has directed five Hallmark Hall of Fame Productions, starting with his first film Durango in 1998. He subsequently directed Cupid & Cate, which starred Mary Louise Parker, Brush with Fate starring Glenn Close and Ellen Burstyn, the critically acclaimed The Magic of Ordinary Days starring Keri Russell and Skeet Ulrich, which aired in 2005 and became the season's highest-rated film on television. And he helmed the 2007 season's highest-rated television film The Valley of Light starring Chris Klein and Gretchen Mol. Shields has been a member of the Directors Guild of America since 1998. Brent has worked with such noted artists as Kathy Bates, Cuba Gooding Jr., Anna Paquin, Laurence Fishburne, Diane Lane, Jessica Lange, Laura Linney, Gary Sinise, Sissy Spacek, Jessica Tandy, Alfre Woodard, James Woods, Sam Elliott, Judy Davis, Vanessa Redgrave, Andy Garcia, William Hurt, Ellen Burstyn, Jennifer Garner, Clive Owen, Catherine Zeta-Jones, Alicia Keys, Christopher Lloyd, Julia Stiles, Odette Annable, Sheryl Lee Ralph and Alexis Bledel.

Shields' first production, To Dance with the White Dog, was in 1993.

Shields' productions have been nominated for four Primetime Emmy Awards. His credits include The Makeover (an update of George Bernard Shaw's Pygmalion), A Smile as Big as the Moon, Firelight, Brush with Fate, Christmas with Holly, and Mitch Albom's Have a Little Faith.

In 2008 he was executive producer of the film Front of the Class, based on the true story of a person with Tourette syndrome.

Other credits:

- 2018: No Sleep 'Til Christmas (TV movie) (executive producer)
- 2018: Hichki (feature film) (executive producer)
- 2015: Just in Time for Christmas (TV movie) (executive producer)
- 2015: Away and Back (TV movie) (executive producer)
- 2014: One Christmas Eve (TV movie) (executive producer)
- 2014: In My Dreams (TV movie) (executive producer)
- 2013: Christmas in Conway (TV movie) (executive producer)
- 2013: Remember Sunday (TV movie) (executive producer)
- 2013: The Makeover (TV movie) (executive producer)
- 2012: Christmas with Holly (TV movie) (executive producer)
- 2012: Firelight (TV movie) (executive producer)
- 2012: A Smile as Big as the Moon (TV movie) (executive producer)
- 2011: Have a Little Faith (TV movie) (executive producer)
- 2011: Beyond the Blackboard (TV movie) (executive producer)
- 2011: The Lost Valentine (TV movie) (executive producer)
- 2010: November Christmas (TV movie) (executive producer)
- 2010: When Love Is Not Enough: The Lois Wilson Story (TV movie) (executive producer)
- 2010: The Magic of Ordinary Days (TV movie) (director producer)
- 2009: The Courageous Heart of Irena Sendler (TV movie) (executive producer)
- 2009: A Dog Named Christmas (TV movie) (executive producer)
- 2009: Loving Leah (TV movie) (executive producer)
- 2008: Front of the Class (TV movie) (executive producer)
- 2008: Sweet Nothing in My Ear (TV movie) (executive producer)
- 2008: The Russell Girl (TV movie) (executive producer)
- 2007: Crossroads: A Story of Forgiveness (executive producer)
- 2007: Pictures of Hollis Woods (TV movie) (executive producer)
- 2006: Candles on Bay Street (TV movie) (executive producer)
- 2006: In From the Night (TV movie) (executive producer)
- 2006: The Water is Wide (TV movie) (executive producer)
- 2005: Silver Bells (TV movie) (executive producer)
- 2004: Back When We Were Grownups (TV movie) (executive producer)
- 2004: Plainsong (TV movie) (executive producer)
- 2004: The Blackwater Lightship (TV movie) (co-executive producer)
- 2003: Brush with Fate A.K.A. Girl in Hyacinth Blue (TV movie) (producer/director)
- 2003: Fallen Angel (TV movie) (co-executive producer)
- 2003: A Painted House (TV movie) (co-executive producer)
- 2002: My Sister's Keeper (TV movie) (producer)
- 2002: The Locket (TV movie) (co-executive producer)
- 2002: Little John (TV movie) (producer)
- 2001: In Love and War (TV movie) (producer)
- 2001: The Seventh Stream (TV movie) (co-executive producer)
- 2001: Follow the Stars Home (TV movie) (co-executive producer)
- 2001: The Flamingo Rising (TV movie) (co-executive producer)
- 2000: The Runaway (TV movie) (co-executive producer)
- 2000: The Lost Child (TV movie) (co-executive producer)
- 2000: Missing Pieces (TV movie) (co-executive producer)
- 1999: A Season for Miracles (TV movie) (co-executive producer)
- 1999: Durango (TV movie) (producer/director)
- 1999: Night Ride Home (TV movie) (co-executive producer)
- 1998: Grace and Glory (TV movie) (co-executive producer)
- 1998: Saint Maybe (TV movie) (producer)
- 1998: The Echo of Thunder (TV movie) (co-executive producer)
- 1998: The Love Letter (TV movie) (co-executive producer)
- 1997: Old Man (TV movie) (TV movie) (producer)
- 1997: Ellen Foster (TV movie) (co-executive producer)
- 1997: What the Deaf Man Heard (TV movie) (co-executive producer)
- 1997: Rose Hill (TV movie) (co-executive producer)
- 1996: Timepiece (TV movie) (co-executive producer)
- 1996: The Summer of Ben Tyler (TV movie) (co-executive producer)
- 1996: Calm at Sunset (TV movie) (co-executive producer)
- 1996: Harvest of Fire (TV movie) (co-executive producer)
- 1996: In the Lake of the Woods (TV movie) (co-executive producer)
- 1996: The Boys Next Door (TV movie) (co-executive producer)
- 1996: The Canterville Ghost (TV movie) (co-executive producer)
- 1995: The Ranger the Cook and a Hole in the Sky (TV movie) (producer)
- 1995: Journey (TV movie) (producer)
- 1995: Blue River (TV movie) (producer)
- 1995: The Great Mom Swap (TV movie) (producer)
- 1995: A Season of Hope (TV movie) (co-producer)
- 1995: From the Mixed-Up Files of Mrs. Basil E. Frankweiler (TV movie) (co-executive producer)
- 1995: Secrets (TV movie) (co-producer)
- 1995: Redwood Curtain (TV movie) (co-producer)
- 1995: Follow the River (TV movie) (co-producer)
- 1995: The Piano Lesson (TV movie) (co-producer)
- 1994: Breathing Lessons (TV movie (co-producer)
- 1994: The Return of the Native (TV movie) (co-producer)
- 1994: A Promise Kept: The Oksana Baiul Story (TV movie) (Producer)
- 1994: Starstruck (TV movie) (co-producer)
- 1994: Trick of the Eye (TV movie) (co-producer)
- 1994: Getting Out (TV movie) (co-producer)
- 1993: To Dance with the White Dog (co-producer)
