= Martin Landau =

American actor (1928–2017)

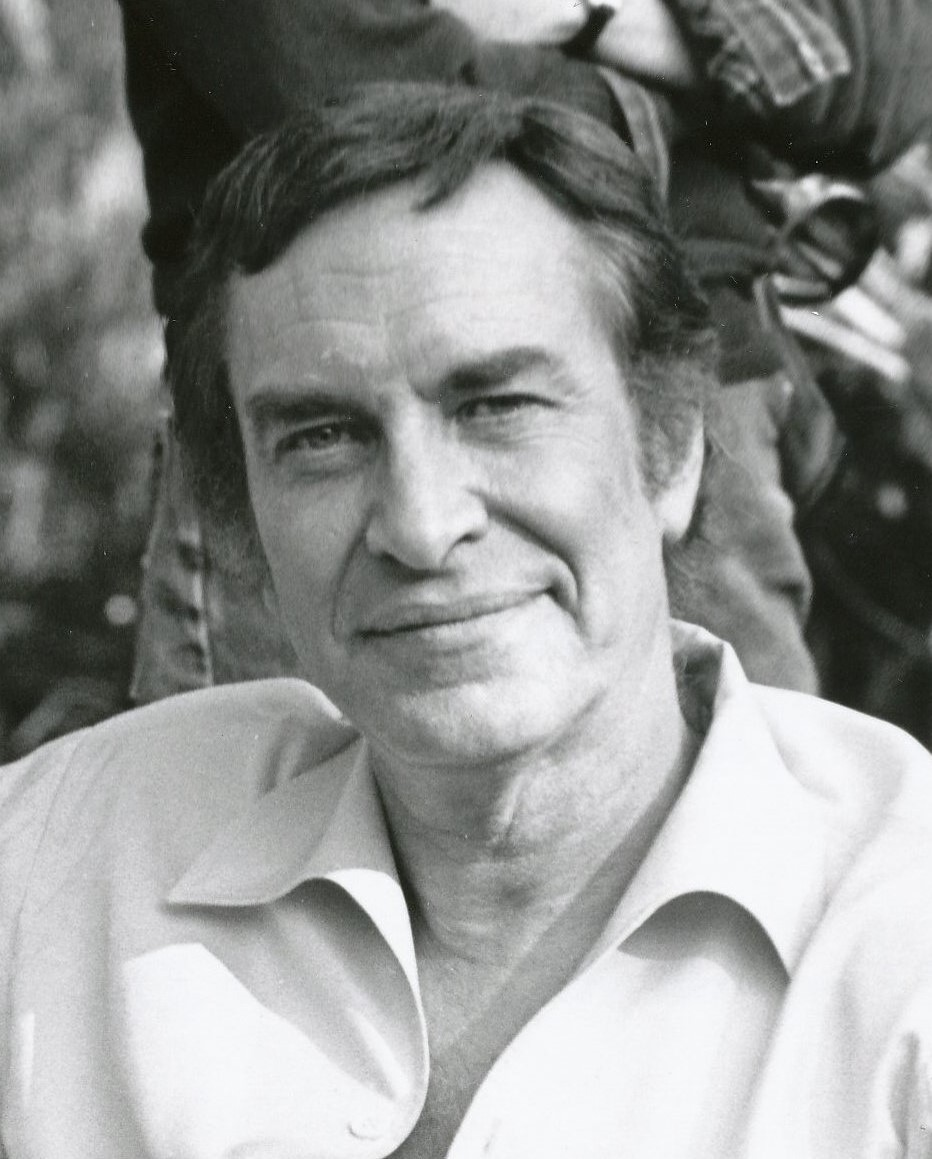
- Landau in 1983
- Born: Martin James Landau; June 20, 1928; New York City, U.S.
- Died: July 15, 2017 (aged 89); Los Angeles, California, U.S.
- Resting place: Beth David Cemetery, New York, U.S.
- Education: Pratt Institute
- Occupation: Actor
- Years active: 1957–2017
- Works: Filmography
- Spouse: Barbara Bain (m. 1957; div. 1993)
- Children: Susan Landau Finch; Juliet Landau

Martin James Landau (/ˈlændaʊ/; June 20, 1928 – July 15, 2017) was an American actor. His career began in the late 1950s, with early film appearances including a supporting role in Alfred Hitchcock's North by Northwest (1959). His career breakthrough came with leading roles in the television series Mission: Impossible (1966–1969) and Space: 1999 (1975–1977).

Landau earned Academy Award nominations for his performances in Tucker: The Man and His Dream (1988) and Woody Allen's Crimes and Misdemeanors (1989). He won the Academy Award, the Actor Award and the Golden Globe Award Best Supporting Actor for his portrayal of Bela Lugosi in Ed Wood (1994). Landau is also remembered for his performances in Cleopatra (1963), The Greatest Story Ever Told (1965), Rounders (1998), Sleepy Hollow (1999), and Remember (2015). He headed the Hollywood branch of the Actors Studio until his death in July 2017.

== Early life and education ==
Landau was born on June 20, 1928, in Brooklyn, New York, the son of Morris and Selma Landau (née Buchman). His family was Jewish. His father was an Austrian-born machinist who tried to rescue relatives from the Nazis.

After attending both James Madison High School and Pratt Institute, he found work at the New York Daily News. There he spent the next five years as an editorial cartoonist and worked alongside Gus Edson to produce the comic strip The Gumps. He quit the Daily News when he was 22 to concentrate on theater acting. "I told the picture editor I was going into the theater", he recalled. "I think he thought I was going to be an usher."

After auditioning for the Actors Studio in 1955, Landau and Steve McQueen were the only applicants accepted out of 500. While there, he trained under Lee Strasberg, Elia Kazan, and Harold Clurman, and eventually became an executive director with the Studio alongside Mark Rydell and Sydney Pollack.

== Career ==
=== 1957–1965: Rise to prominence ===
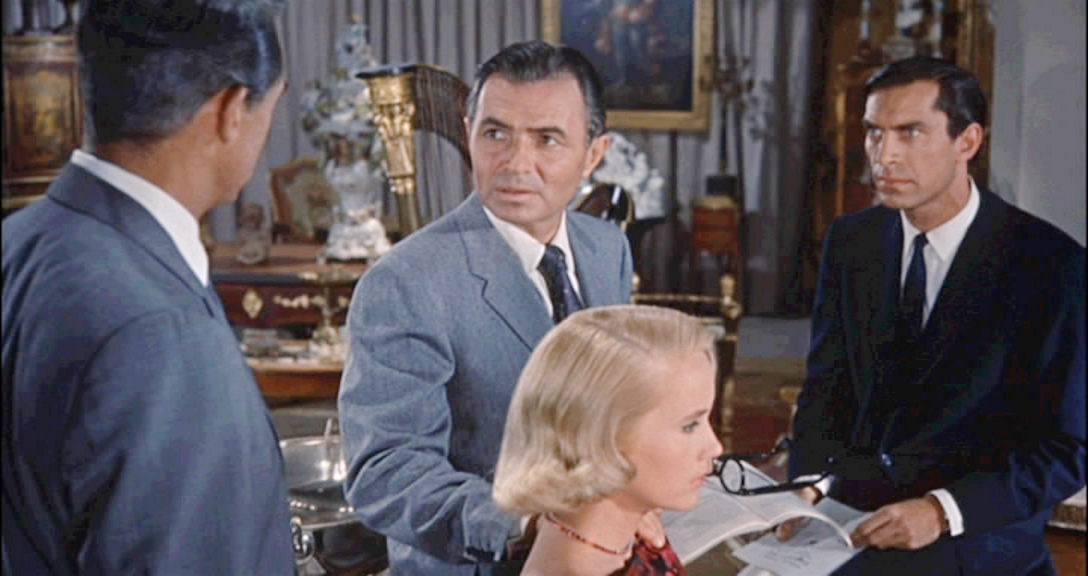
Cary Grant, James Mason, Eva Marie Saint, and Landau in North by Northwest

Influenced by Charlie Chaplin and the escapism of the cinema, Landau pursued an acting career. While at the Actors Studio, he became good friends with James Dean. He recalled, "James Dean was my best friend. We were two young would-be and still-yet-to-work unemployed actors, dreaming out loud and enjoying every moment ... We'd spend lots of time talking about the future, our craft and our chances of success in this newly different, ever-changing modern world we were living in."

In 1957, he made his Broadway debut in Middle of the Night. Landau made his first major film appearance in Alfred Hitchcock's North by Northwest (1959) starring Cary Grant and Eva Marie Saint. Landau portrayed Leonard, the right-hand man of a criminal portrayed by James Mason. Variety praised Landau's performance, writing "[His performance] creates individuality and excitement." That same year he acted in the Korean War film Pork Chop Hill starring Gregory Peck and directed by Lewis Milestone, and the black comedy The Gazebo starring Glenn Ford and Debbie Reynolds and directed by George Marshall. He appeared on television in Wanted: Dead or Alive S2 E19 "The Monster" as Khorba, a rogue elephant trainer who uses his elephant to rob miners of their gold. The series starred Steve McQueen; the episode first aired on January 14, 1960. In 1962, he acted in the Western film Stagecoach to Dancers' Rock. In 1963, he played a survivor of a post-pandemic world in The Outer Limits episode, "The Man Who Was Never Born". He returned for a second guest appearance on the series as scientist Richard Bellero in "The Bellero Shield". (1964). Landau appeared in two episodes of the science fiction series The Twilight Zone; as town bully Dan Hotaling in S1 E3 "Mr. Denton on Doomsday", and as Major Ivan Kuchenko in S5 E29 "The Jeopardy Room". In 1965, he played villain General Grimm in the TV series The Wild Wild West S1 E11 "The Night of the Red-Eyed Madmen". Other TV series credits during this period include Maverick, Rawhide, Wagon Train, Bonanza, The Rifleman, I Spy, The Big Valley, The Man from U.N.C.L.E., and as Doc Holliday in Tales of Wells Fargo, S3 E34.

He had featured roles in two 1960s epics: Rufio in the Joseph L. Mankiewicz directed Cleopatra (1963) and Caiaphas in the George Stevens directed The Greatest Story Ever Told (1965). The latter was an historical epic which cost a reported $20 million and featured performances from stars such as Charlton Heston, Max Von Sydow, Claude Rains, Dorothy McGuire, Jose Ferrer, Roddy McDowall, and Angela Lansbury. The following year he played a ruthless killer in the Western action adventure prequel Nevada Smith (1966) starring Steve McQueen.

=== 1966–1969: Mission: Impossible and acclaim ===
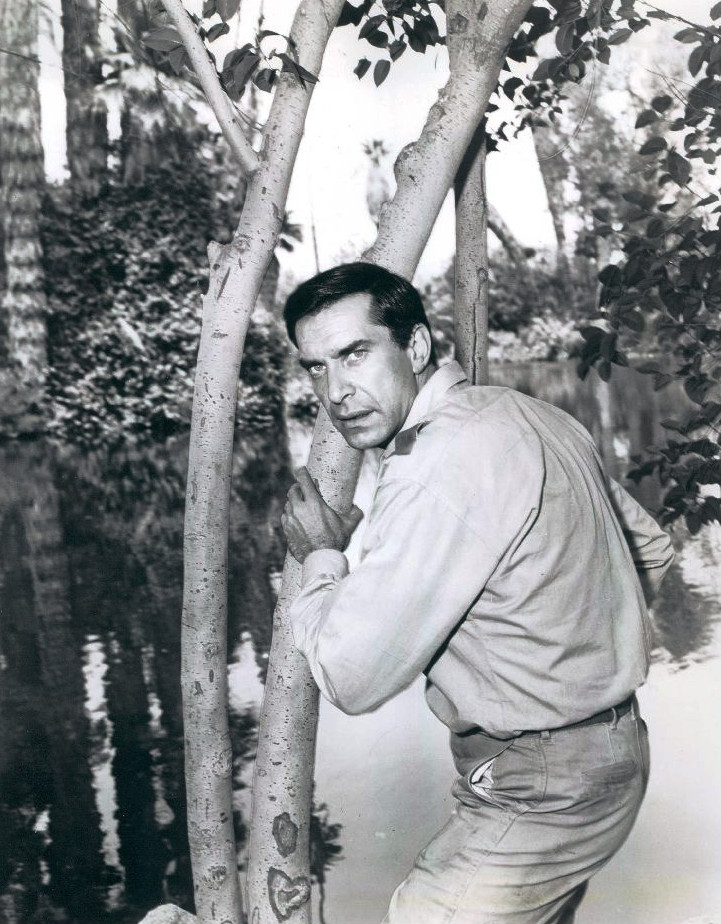
Landau in his role as Rollin Hand in Mission: Impossible

Landau played the supporting role of master of disguise Rollin Hand in the first three seasons of the US television series Mission: Impossible, from 1966 to 1969, for which he received three straight Emmy nominations. Landau at first declined to be contracted by the show because he did not want it to interfere with his film career; instead, he was credited for "special guest appearances" during the first season. He became a full-time cast member in the second season, although the studio agreed to Landau's request to contract him only on a year-by-year basis rather than the then-standard five years. The role of Hand required Landau to perform a wide range of accents and characters, from dictators to thugs, and several episodes had him playing dual roles—not only Hand's impersonation, but also the person whom Hand is impersonating. In the series Landau acted alongside his then-wife Barbara Bain, who won an Emmy for her performances each year for all three years. He was replaced by Leonard Nimoy, playing a very similar role but not exactly the same character, for the next two seasons of the series after Landau and Bain left the show.

=== 1970–1987: Movie and television roles ===
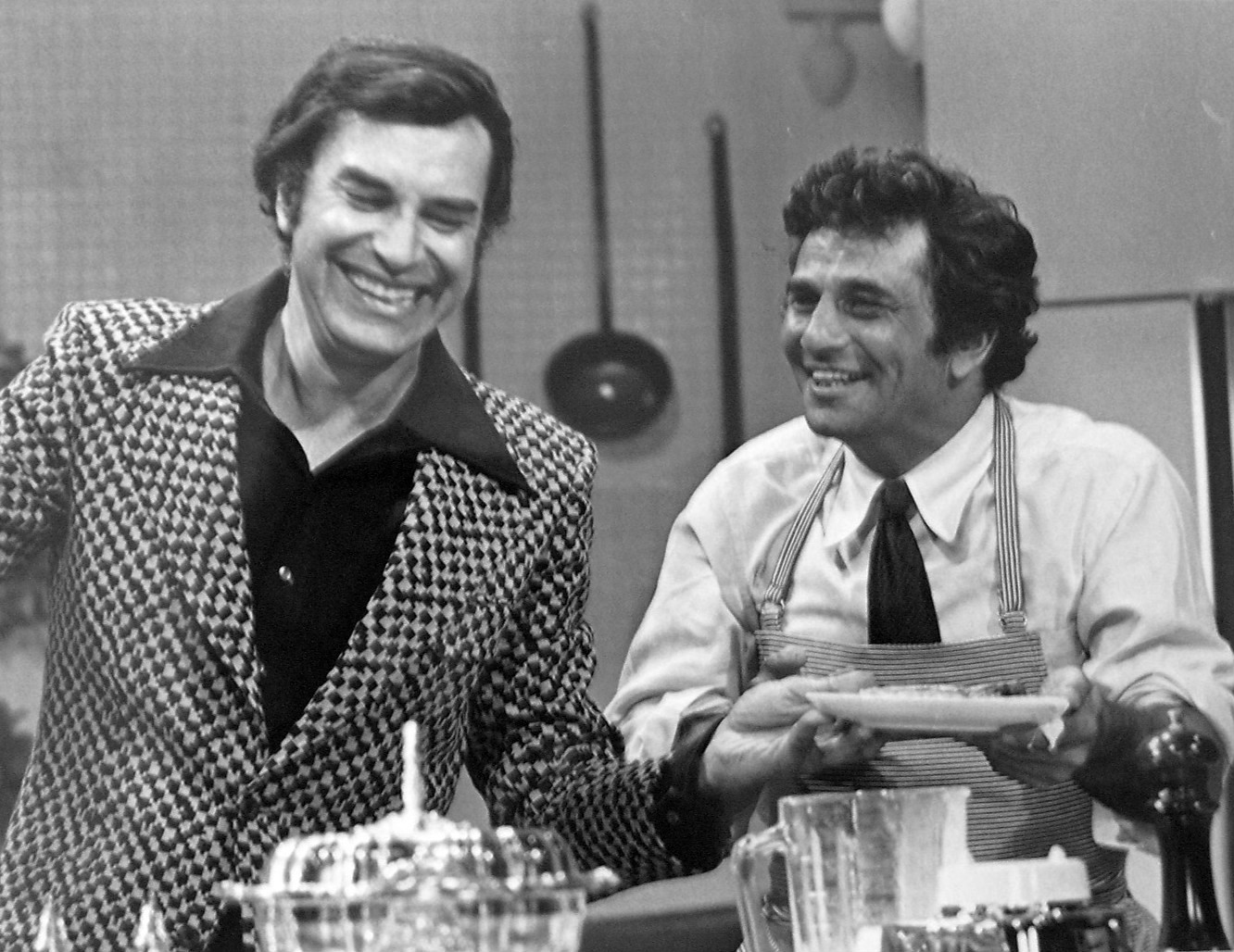
Landau with Peter Falk in Columbo in 1973

During this period, Landau took few film roles and focused on television. He acted in the film They Call Me Mister Tibbs! (1970), The second installment in a trilogy, the release was preceded by In the Heat of the Night (1967) and followed by The Organization (1971). The film starred Sidney Poitier. That same year he starred in the Italian comedy film Operation Snafu. He then acted in the Spaghetti Western A Town Called Bastard (1971), and the neo-noir blaxploitation movie Black Gunn (1972). In 1973, Landau guest-starred in the Columbo episode Double Shock alongside Peter Falk, as twin brothers involved in the murder of their rich uncle. The episode also costarred Dabney Coleman, Julie Newmar, and Jeanette Nolan.

In the mid-1970s, Landau and Bain returned to TV in the British science-fiction series Space: 1999 produced by Gerry Anderson in partnership with Sylvia Anderson, and later with Fred Freiberger. Critical response to Space: 1999 was unenthusiastic during its original run, and it was canceled after two seasons. Landau was critical of the scripts and storylines, especially during the series' second season, but praised the cast and crew. He later wrote forewords to Space: 1999 co-star Barry Morse's theatrical memoir Remember with Advantages (2006) and Jim Smith's critical biography of Tim Burton. Following Space: 1999, Landau appeared in supporting roles in a number of films and TV series. He appeared in low-budget genre pictures, such as the science fiction films Without Warning (1981) and The Being (1983) or the horror film Alone in the Dark (1982). He appeared in roles in, among others, the TV film The Harlem Globetrotters on Gilligan's Island (1981), which co-starred Bain in their final on-screen appearance together.

=== 1989–1999: Career resurgence ===
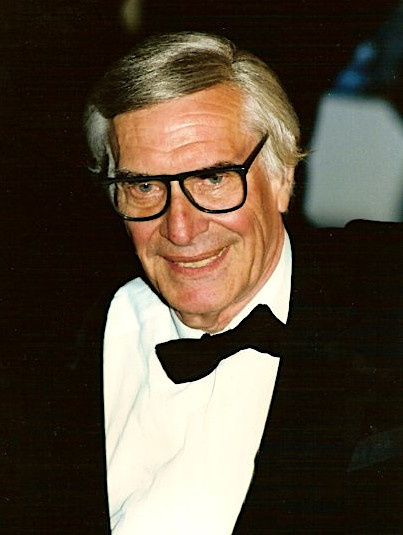
Landau at the 1996 Cannes Film Festival

In the late 1980s, Landau made a career comeback, earning an Academy Award nomination for his role in Tucker: The Man and His Dream (1988). He said he was grateful to the film's director, Francis Ford Coppola, for the opportunity to play a role he enjoyed: "I've spent a lot of time playing roles that didn't really challenge me," he said. "You want roles that have dimension. The role of Abe Karatz gave me that." He won the Golden Globe Award for his part in the film. In 1989, Landau appeared in Woody Allen's Crimes and Misdemeanors (1989) The film is split into two stories: one humorous, one dark in nature. Landau starred in the darker storyline as Judah Rosenthal, a successful ophthalmologist who tries to prevent his mistress, played by Anjelica Huston, from revealing their affair to his wife (Claire Bloom). Landau's character confides his worries to patient and rabbi Sam Waterston as well as his mobster brother Jerry Orbach. Allen remembered of the cast that:

I just couldn't find anybody good for the part of Judah... He read it, and he was completely natural. It's an interesting thing. Of all the actors I've ever worked with, he gives expression to my dialogue exactly as I hear it. His colloquialisms, his idiom, his inflection is exactly correct. So of all the people who've ever read my lines, he makes them correct every time... One of the reasons for this must be that Martin Landau came from my neighborhood in Brooklyn, right near where I lived, only a few blocks away.

The film received critical acclaim, with Roger Ebert giving the film four stars, writing,

The movie generates the best kind of suspense, because it's not about what will happen to people—it's about what decisions they will reach. We have the same information they have. What would we do? How far would we go to protect our happiness and reputation? How selfish would we be? Is our comfort worth more than another person's life? Allen does not evade this question, and his answer seems to be, yes, for some people, it would be.

Landau received an Academy Award nomination for Best Supporting Actor for this performance, losing to Denzel Washington in Glory.

He won an Oscar for Best Supporting Actor for his performance in Ed Wood (1994), a biopic in which Landau plays actor Bela Lugosi. Landau researched the role of Lugosi by watching many old Lugosi movies and studying Lugosi's Hungarian accent, which contributed to Lugosi's decline in acting. "I began to respect this guy and pity him," said Landau. "I saw the humor in him. This, for me, became a love letter to him, because he never got a chance to get out of that. I got a chance to make a comeback in my career. And I'm giving him one. I'm giving him the last role he never got." Landau also received a Screen Actors Guild Award, a Golden Globe Award and a Saturn Award for the role, as well as accolades from a number of critics' groups.

Landau's film roles in the 1990s included a down-on-his-luck Hollywood producer in the comedy Mistress (1992) with Robert De Niro, and judges in the dramas City Hall (1995) with Al Pacino, Rounders (1998) with Matt Damon, B.A.P.S. (1997) with Halle Berry, and Ready to Rumble in 2000. He played Geppetto in The Adventures of Pinocchio (1996). Landau provided the voice of Scorpion for the first two seasons of the 1990s Spider-Man television series. Landau left the series after two seasons when he won the Academy Award and lacked time for the series; Richard Moll was recast as Scorpion. He played the part of Jacob, son of Isaac, in the TV miniseries Joseph, alongside Ben Kingsley as Potiphar and Paul Mercurio as Joseph.

=== 2000–2017: Final roles ===
He played a supporting role in The Majestic (2001), starring Jim Carrey. The film received mostly negative reviews, although one reviewer wrote that "the lone outpost of authenticity is manned by Martin Landau, who gives a heartfelt performance," as an aging father who believes that his missing son has returned from World War II. In the early seasons of Without a Trace (2002–2009), Landau was nominated for a Primetime Emmy Award for his portrayal of the Alzheimer's-afflicted father of FBI Special Agent in Charge Jack Malone, the series' lead character. In 2006, he made a guest appearance in the series Entourage as Bob Ryan, a washed-up but determined and sympathetic Hollywood producer attempting to relive his glory days, a portrayal that earned him a second Emmy nomination.

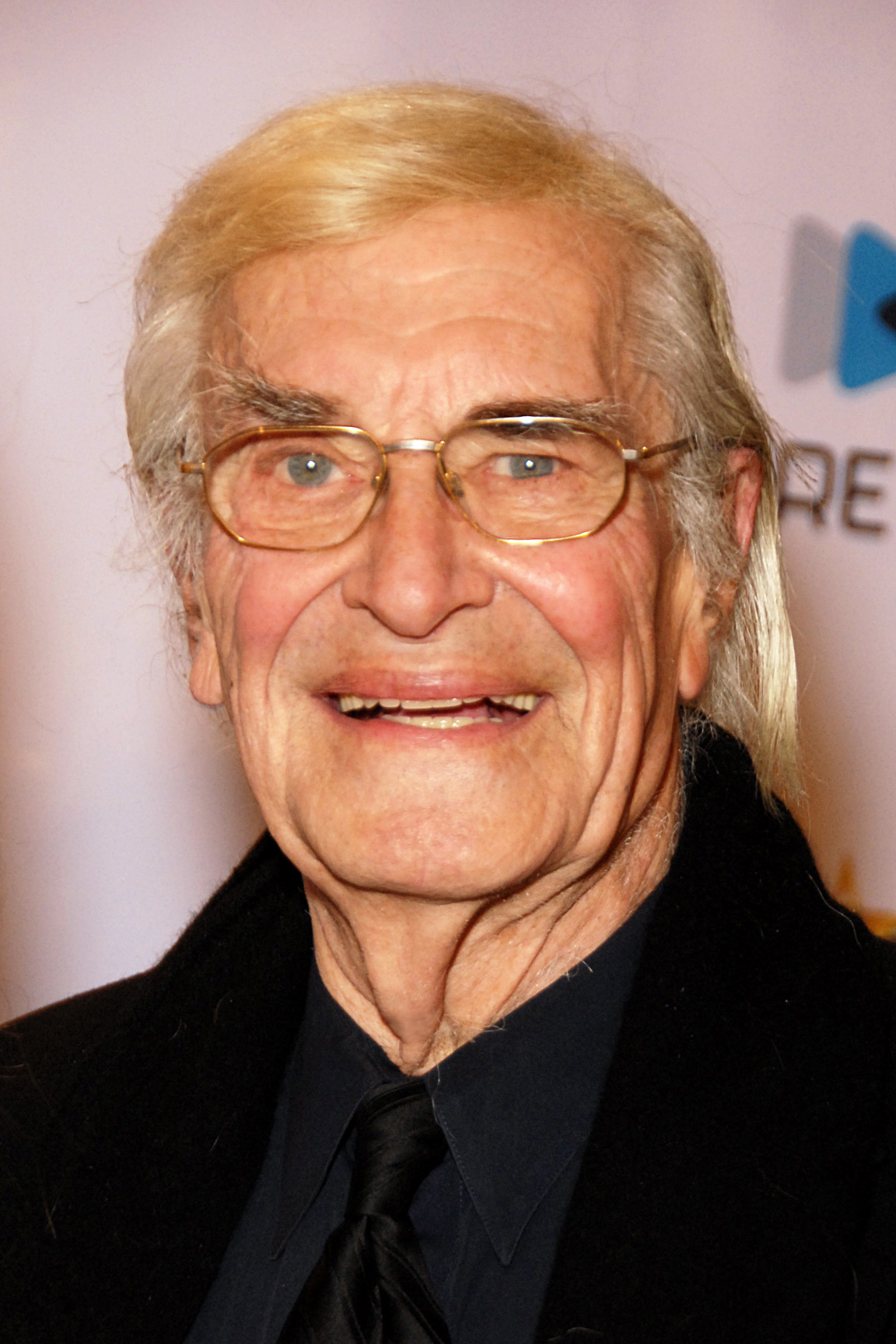
Landau in 2010

Landau appeared in The Aryan Couple, in which he played Joseph Krauzenberg, a very wealthy Hungarian Jewish industrial tycoon. Landau appeared in the television film Have a Little Faith (2011) based on Mitch Albom's book of the same name, in which he played Rabbi Albert Lewis. In 2012, Landau voiced Mr. Rzykruski in the Tim Burton animated Disney film Frankenweenie. In 2015, Landau starred alongside Christopher Plummer in the film Remember. The film received critical praise, with reviewers lauding Landau's and Plummer's performances.

In recognition of his services to the motion picture industry, Landau has a star on the Hollywood Walk of Fame at 6841 Hollywood Boulevard.

== Acting coach ==
Encouraged by his own mentor, Lee Strasberg, Landau also taught acting. Actors coached by him include Jack Nicholson and Anjelica Huston.

== Personal life and death ==
Landau married actress and former co-star Barbara Bain on January 31, 1957. They had two daughters, Susan and Juliet. Landau and Bain divorced in 1993.

On July 15, 2017, Landau died at age 89 at the Ronald Reagan UCLA Medical Center in Los Angeles; he had been briefly hospitalized. The cause of death was hypovolemic shock brought on by internal bleeding and heart disease. Landau is buried at the Beth David Cemetery in Elmont, New York.

== Awards and nominations ==
Year	Award	Category	Title	Results
1989	Academy Awards	Best Supporting Actor	Tucker: The Man and His Dream	Nominated
1990	Academy Awards	Best Supporting Actor	Crimes and Misdemeanors	Nominated
1995	Academy Awards	Best Supporting Actor	Ed Wood	Won
1995	Actor Award	Outstanding Supporting Actor	Ed Wood	Won
1996	BAFTA Award	Best Supporting Actor	Ed Wood	Nominated
1967	Primetime Emmy Awards	Outstanding Actor in a Drama Series	Mission: Impossible	Nominated
1968	Primetime Emmy Awards	Outstanding Actor in a Drama Series	Mission: Impossible	Nominated
1969	Primetime Emmy Awards	Outstanding Actor in a Drama Series	Mission: Impossible	Nominated
2004	Primetime Emmy Awards	Outstanding Guest Actor in a Drama Series	Without a Trace	Nominated
2005	Primetime Emmy Awards	Outstanding Guest Actor in a Drama Series	Without a Trace	Nominated
2007	Primetime Emmy Awards	Outstanding Guest Actor in a Comedy Series	Entourage	Nominated
1968	Golden Globe Awards	Best Actor - Television Series Drama	Mission: Impossible	Won
1989	Golden Globe Awards	Best Supporting Actor - Motion Picture	Tucker: The Man and His Dream	Won
1995	Golden Globe Awards	Best Supporting Actor - Motion Picture	Ed Wood	Won
