= Matt Keeslar =

American actor (born 1972)

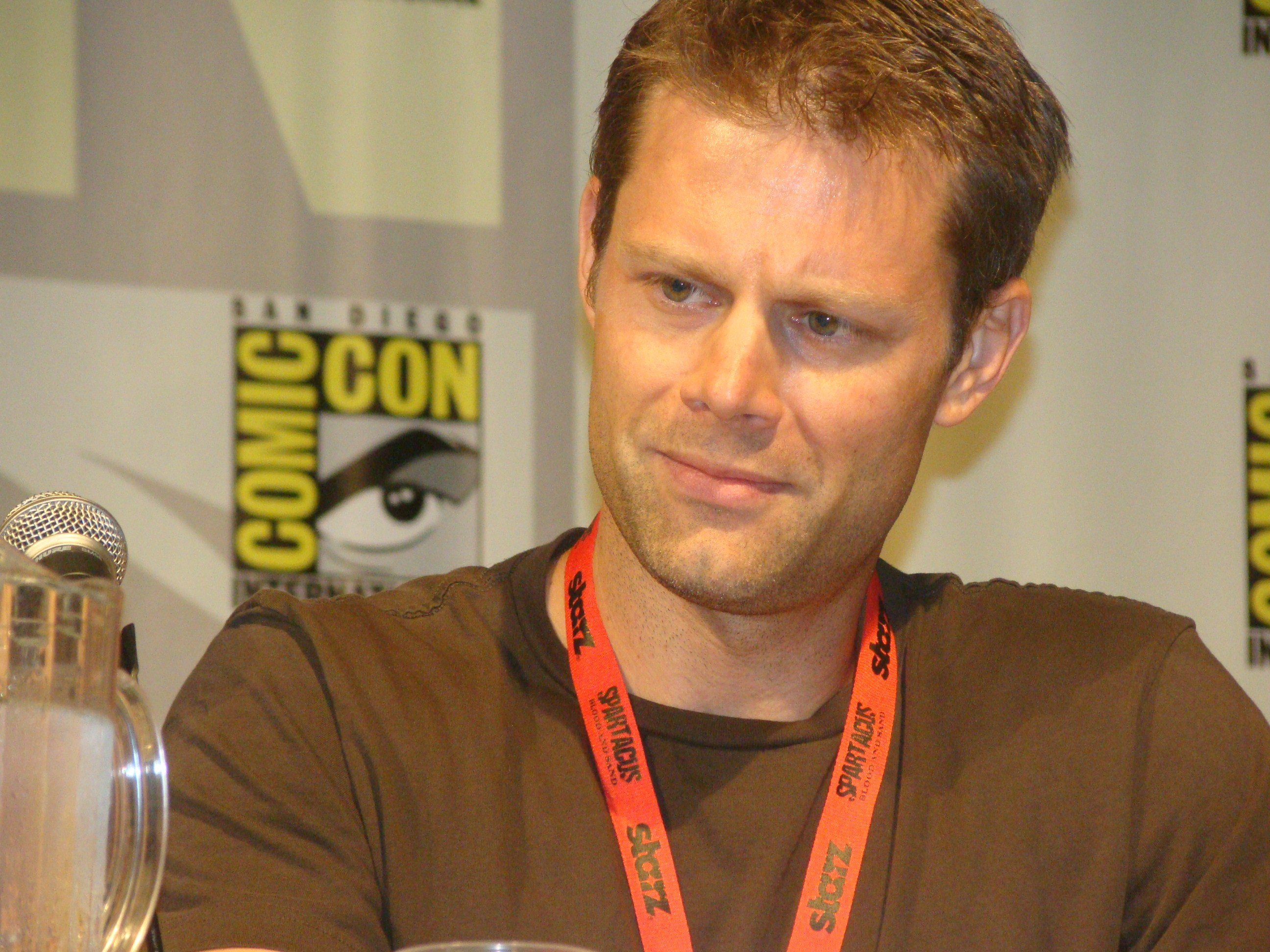
- Keeslar during The Middleman panel at San Diego Comic-Con in July 2009
- Born: October 15, 1972 (age 53); Grand Rapids, Michigan, U.S.
- Education: Juilliard School (BFA); Portland Community College; Reed College (BS); Oregon Health and Science University (MS)
- Occupations: Actor, physician assistant, instructor
- Years active: 1994–2010, 2015
- Spouse: Lori Henriques (m. 2005)
- Children: 2

Matthew Keeslar (born October 15, 1972) is an American retired actor. He is known for his roles in Waiting for Guffman, The Last Days of Disco, Scream 3, and the miniseries Frank Herbert's Dune and Stephen King's Rose Red. He also played the title character in the short-lived sci-fi dramedy The Middleman.

== Life and career ==
Matthew Keeslar was born in Grand Rapids, Michigan, the son of Fred Keeslar and Ann Ferguson, who divorced in 1977.

He attended the acting program at the Juilliard School. While a student there, he played the title role in a touring production of Molière's Don Juan, directed by Joseph Chaiken; produced and starred in a student production of Waiting for Godot; and participated in several interdepartmental productions. He was part of the Drama Division's Group 24, graduating in 1995.

Keeslar appeared in Waiting for Guffman, The Last Days of Disco, Scream 3, and the miniseries Frank Herbert's Dune and Stephen King's Rose Red. He starred in the 2008 ABC Family series The Middleman. He established a strong working relationship with South Coast Repertory in Costa Mesa, California, where he performed plays and staged readings.

=== Post-acting ===
Keeslar retired from acting in 2010, citing financial difficulties and a lack of work, and went on to pursue a career in science. He wrote an essay about his struggles with his acting career and subsequent decision to enroll at Portland Community College. He graduated Phi Beta Kappa from Reed College with a biology degree in May 2014. His biology thesis explored the effects of antimalarials on the brains of frogs.

Keeslar became a practicing PA-C (certified physician assistant). He is an instructor of urology at the Oregon Health and Science University's School of Medicine.

== Personal life ==
Keeslar is married to Grammy-nominated singer Lori Henriques, with whom he has two children.

== Filmography ==
Year	Title	Role	Notes
1994	Renaissance Man	MP At The Gate	
1994	Quiz Show	NBC Page	
1994	Safe Passage	Percival	
1995	The Run of the Country	Danny	
1995	A Streetcar Named Desire	Collector	Television film
1996	A Brother's Promise: The Dan Jansen Story	Dan Jansen	Television film
1996	The Stupids	Lieutenant Neil	
1996	Waiting for Guffman	Johnny Savage	
1997	The Deli	Andy	
1997	Mr. Magoo	Waldo Magoo	
1998	Sour Grapes	Danny Pepper	
1998	The Last Days of Disco	Josh	
1998	Thanks of a Grateful Nation	Chris Small	Television film
1998	Law & Order	Dennis Pollock	Episode: "Venom"
1999	The Reel	Producer	Short film; also writer
1999	Splendor	Zed	
1999	Durango	Mark Doran	Television film
2000	Psycho Beach Party	Lars	
2000	Urbania	Chris	
2000	Scream 3	Tom Prinze	
2000	Íslenski draumurinn	Tony Keaton	
2000	Frank Herbert's Dune	Feyd-Rautha Harkonnen	Miniseries
2001	Thank Heaven	Jack Sellers	
2001	Texas Rangers	Sam 'Suh Suh Sam' Walters	
2002	Untitled Secret Service Project	Mike Pierce	
2002	Stephen King's Rose Red	Steve Rimbauer	Miniseries
2002	Live from Baghdad	Nic Robertson	Television film
2003	Coupling (US)	Bill	Episode: "Dressed"
2005	The Inside	Roddy Davis	Episode: "The Perfect Couple"
2005	In Memory of My Father	Matt	
2006	Masters of Horror	David Fuller	Episode: "Family"
2006	The Thirst	Maxx	
2006	Open Window	The Rapist	
2006	Art School Confidential	Jonah	
2006	Ghost Whisperer	Dennis McMartin	Episode: "Dead Man's Ridge"
2006	Law & Order: Criminal Intent	Willie 'Kirk' Tunis	Episode: "Blasters"
2006	Numb3rs	Agent Raymond	Episode: "Brutus"
2007	Snowglobe	Douglas	Television film
2007	Jekyll	Dr. Henry Jekyll / Mr. Hyde	
2008	The Middleman	The Middleman	12 episodes
2009	Dollhouse	Richard Connell	Episode: "The Target"
2009	Cold Storage	Daric	
2010	Leverage	Alexander Lundy	Episode: "The Zanzibar Marketplace Job"
2015	Grimm	Sven Gunderson	Episode: "Hibernaculum"
