= Jekyll (2007 film) =

- Directed by: Scott Zakarin
- Written by: Scott Zakarin; Robert Louis Stevenson
- Produced by: Steve Fogel; Peter Jaysen; Eric Mittleman; Rich Tackenberg
- Starring: Matt Keeslar; Jonathan Silverman; Desmond Askew; Alanna Ubach; Siena Goines; Abigail Spencer; John Rubinstein; Josh Stewart
- Cinematography: William MacCollum
- Edited by: Joe Vallero
- Music by: Ivan Koutikov; Steve McCarty
- Distributed by: Lightyear Entertainment
- Release date: 2007
- Country: United States
- Language: English

Jekyll is a 2007 American horror film starring Matt Keeslar, Jonathan Silverman, Desmond Askew, Alanna Ubach, Siena Goines, Abigail Spencer, John Rubinstein, Josh Stewart and Roger Rose and written and directed by Scott Zakarin. It is a film adaptation of Robert Louis Stevenson's 1886 novella Strange Case of Dr. Jekyll & Mr. Hyde.

== Plot ==
While doing research, Dr. Henry Jekyll creates a computer-generated alter-ego, Mr. Hyde, a creature of uncontrollable impulses who goes on a killing spree and tries to kill his own creator.

== Cast ==
- Matt Keeslar as Dr. Henry Jekyll/Mr. Hyde
- Jonathan Silverman as Lanyon
- Alanna Ubach as Michelle Utterson
- Siena Goines as Christy
- Desmond Askew as Ziggy Poole
- Abigail Spencer as Talia Carew
- John Rubinstein as Daniel Carew
- Brian Palermo as John
- Josh Stewart as Tommy
- Steve Fogel as Dr. Johnathan Flagstaff
- Aron Brumfueld as Mike
- Joe Basile as Nick
- Lisa Donahue as Lauren
- Erin Cahill as Allison
- Mike Baldridge as Dr. Derik Carew
- Travis Aaron Wade as Matthew Carew
- Chad Brokaw as Crazed Patient
- Gathering Marbet as Celia Flagstaff
- Daran Norris as Emcee
- Petra Sprecher as Christy Monster
- Lisa Picotte as Nurse
- Jason Fanut as Bartender
- Jess Harnell as Guy #1
- Roger Rose as Guy #2
- Brian Oerly as Eager Guy
