= The Time Keeper =

Work of inspirational fiction by Mitch Albom

- First edition
- Author: Mitch Albom
- Language: English (American English)
- Series: -
- Genre: Inspirational fiction
- Publisher: Hyperion Books
- Publication date: September 4, 2012
- Publication place: United States
- Media type: Print (Hardcover)
- Pages: 240 pp (first edition, hardcover)
- ISBN: 1-401-32278-6 (first edition, hardcover)

The Time Keeper is a work of inspirational fiction by author Mitch Albom.

== Synopsis ==
Dor, the central character, invents the first clock. Punished for trying to measure time, Dor is banished to a cave for thousands of years. Dor becomes Father Time and has to listen to every person who laments about not having enough time. Eventually, Dor has a chance to redeem himself and regain his freedom. He must help two diametrically different people understand the value of time management. One is a teenage girl named Sarah Lemon, who has decided to commit suicide after her parents divorce and the boy she likes, whom she believed to have loved her, begins flirting with her but then rejects and humiliates her.

The other person is a wealthy elderly businessman, Victor Delamonte. Victor is terminally ill with cancer and wishes to cheat death through cryogenic freezing. Knowing that his wife will disapprove, he chooses not to tell her.

Dor changes their fates by stopping time and showing them their futures, in which Sarah's mother is grieving her death, and the businessman Victor fails in his plan of freezing himself and is 'reborn' in the future. Both Sarah and Victor reconsider their plans, and Dor and his dying wife, Alli rekindle their broken relationship.

== Reviews ==
Rabbi Jason Miller said of the book, "Time is on our wrists and computer screens, on our cell phones and on the walls of our home, but Mitch Albom teaches us that being a time keeper is not the way to live." A review in Publishers Weekly said, "Albom deftly juggles multiple narratives to craft an inspiring tale that will please his fans and newcomers alike." A review on the Bookreport.com website said, "Albom has gained a well-deserved reputation for writing about matters of faith, mortality and the afterlife in ways that resonate with readers. In The Time Keeper, he does the same thing in a story that also reminds people how to try to live each day." A reviewer for the Deseret News online also praised the work. She wrote, "Mitch Albom . . . returns to fiction with a unique and inspiring new book titled The Time Keeper."

== Release ==
The hardcover edition was released on September 4, 2011.
