= Durango (film) =

1999 American TV film

- Based on: Durango by John B. Keane
- Screenplay by: Walter Bernstein
- Directed by: Brent Shields
- Starring: Matt Keeslar; Patrick Bergin; George Hearn
- Music by: Mark McKenzie
- Country of origin: United States
- Original language: English

Production
- Producer: Brent Shields
- Cinematography: Shelly Johnson
- Editor: Sabrina Plisco-Morris
- Running time: 98 minutes
- Production company: Hallmark Hall of Fame Productions

Original release
- Network: CBS
- Release: April 25, 1999

Durango is a 1999 American made-for-television drama film directed by Brent Shields and starring Matt Keeslar and Patrick Bergin.

== Plot ==
A young Irish cattle farmer, Mark Doran (Matt Keeslar), decides to walk 40 miles (64 km) with his cows to the village of Trallock to get a fair price for his herd rather than sell.

== Cast ==
- Matt Keeslar as Mark Doran
- Patrick Bergin as Fergus Mullaney
- George Hearn as Rector
- Brenda Fricker as Aunt Maeve
- Nancy St. Alban as Annie Mullaney
- Dermot Martin as Jay Mullaney
- Paul Ronan as Tom Mullaney
- Eamon Morrissey as Philly Hinds
- Mark Lambert as Algie Clawhammer
- Ian McElhinney as Vestor McCarthy
- Pat Laffan as Bill Gobberley
