= Temple Beth Sholom (Cherry Hill, New Jersey) =

Conservative synagogue in New Jersey, US

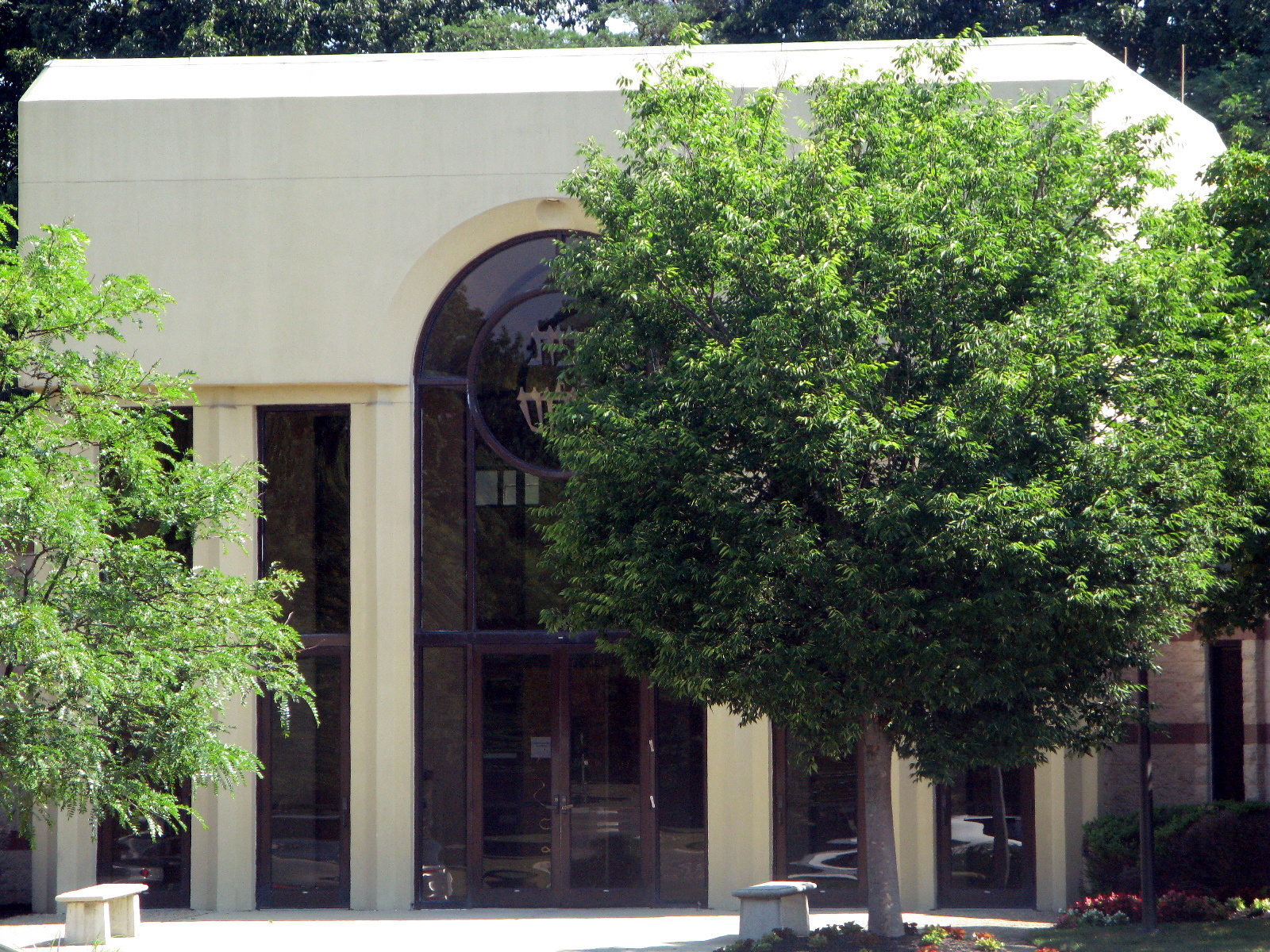
- Main entrance of Temple Beth Sholom

- Location in Camden County, New Jersey

Religion
- Affiliation: Conservative Judaism
- Ecclesiastical or organisational status: Synagogue
- Leadership: Rabbi Micah Peltz; Rabbi Bryan Wexler; Rabbi Steven Lindemann (Emeritus)
- Status: Active

Location
- Location: 1901 Kresson Road, Cherry Hill, Camden County, New Jersey
- Country: United States
- Administration: United Synagogue of Conservative Judaism
- Coordinates: 39°52′30″N 74°57′17″W

Architecture
- Established: 1940 (as a congregation)
- Completed: 1940 (Haddon Heights); 1989 (Cherry Hill)
- Capacity: 2,200 worshippers

Website
- tbsonline.org

Temple Beth Sholom (abbreviated as TBS) is a Conservative synagogue located at 1901 Kresson Road in Cherry Hill, Camden County, New Jersey, in the United States. TBS was founded in 1940 and moved to its current building in Cherry Hill in 1989.

== History ==
A member of the United Synagogue of Conservative Judaism, TBS was founded in 1940 at its former location at 19 White Horse Pike in Haddon Heights, about six miles (nine point seven kilometres) west of Cherry Hill. Among the founders was S.H. Fastow, the owner of Fastow's Five & Ten Cent Store in Haddon Heights, which opened in 1936 and closed in 2001. The founders located the synagogue in Haddon Heights hoping that as Jews moved from Camden into the suburbs, they would settle around the synagogue, but that did not happen. As of 1948, the synagogue had 50 member families. While in Haddon Heights, it grew to over 600 families.

In 1989, the synagogue moved to its current location in eastern Cherry Hill, at the corner of Kresson and Cropwell Roads. In January 1989, members of the congregation marched for 6 miles (9.7 km) carrying the synagogue's ten Torahs from their old location in Haddon Heights to the new synagogue in Cherry Hill. The Cherry Hill synagogue seats 2,000 people, has a school wing with 19 classrooms, and in 2002 expanded to include a Green Center for Jewish Learning, an expansion of 13,000-square-foot (1,200 m^{2}), that contains a multimedia resource center and seven high school classrooms. The synagogue includes about 1,000 member families, and offers a variety of educational and cultural programs.

== Clergy ==
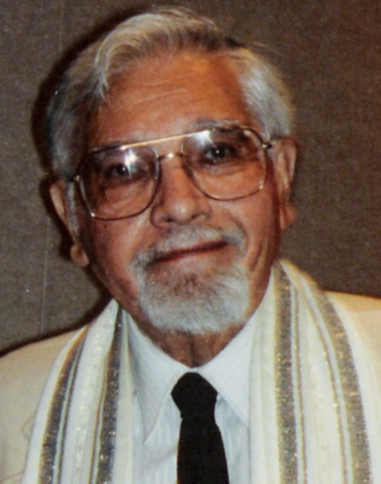
Rabbi Albert L. Lewis (1917–2008)

Former staff include Rabbi Albert L. Lewis (1917–2008), who served for 44 years at TBS. Lewis was also a Rabbi Emeritus at the synagogue.

Steven Wernick is a former Associate Rabbi of the synagogue.

As of 2018, the Senior Rabbi was Micah Peltz, the Associate Rabbi was Bryan Wexler, the Rabbi Emeritus was Steven Lindemann, and the cantor was Jen Cohen.

== Notable members ==
As a child, celebrated Hollywood actor, producer, writer and director Michael Landon (born Eugene Maurice Orowitz) had his bar mitzvah at TBS, as did noted author Mitch Albom. Steven Spielberg and his family were members of the synagogue while they lived in New Jersey in the 1950s.
