= Have a Little Faith (book) =

Book by Mitch Albom

- Book design based on Lewis's old and worn prayerbook, held together by rubber bands
- Author: Mitch Albom
- Language: English
- Genre: Non-fiction
- Publication date: 2009
- Publication place: United States
- Media type: Print Hardcover, Paperback

Have a Little Faith is a 2009 non-fiction book by Mitch Albom, author of previous works that include Tuesdays with Morrie and The Five People You Meet in Heaven. It is based on two separate sets of conversations that took place between the author and members of the clergy: a rabbi in a relatively affluent section of New Jersey, and a Protestant minister in a very poor section of Detroit, Michigan.

== Synopsis ==
Albom (Mitchel David "Mitch" Albom) writes in the introduction to this book that the idea for it began with the request by Albert L. Lewis, his childhood rabbi, to write and deliver the eulogy when the time came for the rabbi's funeral. Albom agreed, contingent on an agreement that he could begin a series of interviews and conversations, in order to get to know Lewis as a man, not just as a rabbi.

Albom writes that his conversations with Lewis—whom he refers to as the Reb, an affectionate term drawn from the Yiddish word for rabbi—eventually led to an increased interest on Albom's part in the power and meaning of faith in a larger sense. In his hometown of Detroit, he forged a link with Pastor Henry Covington, an African-American Protestant minister at the I Am My Brother's Keeper Church. Covington, a past drug-addict, dealer, and ex-convict, was ministering to the needs of his down-and-out parishioners, in an urban church serving a largely homeless congregation, in a church so poor that the roof leaked when it rained.

The book alternates between his conversations with Lewis and excerpts from some of his sermons; and Life of Henry, the title of the sections describing his conversations with Covington, and stories about him.

From his relationships with these two very different men of faith, Albom writes about the difference faith can make in the world. Albom writes as follows:

This is a story about believing in something and the two very different men who taught me how. It took a long time to write. It took me to churches and synagogues, to the suburbs and the city, to the "us" versus "them" that divides faith around the world. And finally, it took me home, to a sanctuary filled with people, to a casket made of pine, to a pulpit that was empty."

In the beginning, there was a question. It became a last request. "Will you do my eulogy?" And, as is often the case with faith, I thought I was being asked a favor, when in fact I was being given one."

Albom has told interviewers that he believes that the reason Lewis originally asked him to deliver the eulogy may actually have been a way to draw him back to the roots of his own faith, and "back to God a little bit."

=== Sermon by the Reb ===
Albom included a number of Lewis's many stories, which were used as mini-sermons for his congregation, in the book. One example is this story, delivered in 1981:

A soldier's little girl, whose father was being moved to a distant post, was sitting at the airport among her family's meager belongings. The girl was sleepy. She leaned against the packs and duffel bags. A lady came by, stopped, and patted her on the head. "Poor child," she said. "You haven't got a home."

The child looked up in surprise. "But we do have a home," she said. "We just don't have a house to put it in."

=== The Eulogy ===
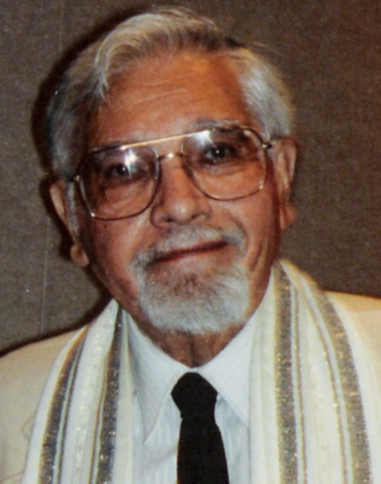
Rabbi Albert L. Lewis

The book, both about individuals with faith and faith itself, concludes with the eulogy that Albom delivered at Lewis's funeral, on February 12, 2008. It included the words:

I didn't want to eulogize you. I was afraid. I felt a congregant could never eulogize his leader. But I realize now that thousands of congregants will eulogize you today, in their car rides home, over the dinner table. A eulogy is no more than a summation of memories, and we will never forget you, because we cannot forget you, because we will miss you every day. To imagine a world without you in it is to imagine a world with a little less God in it, and yet, because God is not a diminishing resource, I cannot believe that.

In addition to the eulogy, the book describes the fact that funeral attendees were surprised to hear a seven-minute taped message from Lewis, which he specifically prepared to be played at the funeral. In it, he delivers his final teaching to his congregation, touching on questions about God and immortality; expressing his gratitude to friends and family for the privilege of knowing them; and ending with the words, Shalom Haverim -- Goodbye, Friends.

== Reception ==
This book is being used by religious and non-religious groups around the country, in discussions about faith and as an inspiration for interfaith dialogue, charity, and community service projects.

One of the direct results of Albom's conversations with Covington, and the writing of this book, was the establishment of the A Hole in the Roof Foundation. The Foundation helps faith groups of every denomination with programs for the homeless repair the spaces in which they carry out this work. While repairing Covington's church was the first project for the Foundation, it has since worked in areas including repairs to the Caring and Sharing Mission and Orphanage in Port-au-Prince, Haiti, after the 2010 Haiti earthquake.

Additionally, the Author's Note in the book states that, "Per the tradition of tithing, one-tenth of the author's profits on every book sold will be donated to charity, including the church, synagogue, and homeless shelters in this story."

When the book was released, it was the No.1 book on The New York Times Non-fiction Best Seller list for January 10, 2010.

== Film adaptation ==
In June 2011, an announcement was made that the book would be filmed as a made-for-television movie, scheduled for release during the 2011 Christmas season on ABC. However, the movie's television screening was moved up from Christmas weekend to Thanksgiving weekend, and aired on ABC Sunday November 27.

Martin Landau portrays Albert Lewis, and Laurence Fishburne plays Henry Covington. The film was produced by Hallmark Hall of Fame and directed by Jon Avnet with a screenplay by Mitch Albom. The film, which also stars Bradley Whitford as Albom, began filming in Detroit in June 2011. Hank Azaria, who played Albom in the 1999 TV film Tuesdays with Morrie, was offered the chance to reprise the role, but had to reject the part due to filming conflicts with the sitcom Free Agents.

An advance "world premiere charity event" screening of the movie took place on November 16, 2011, at the Emagine Theatre complex in Royal Oak, Michigan. All ten theaters within the Emagine Multiplex Theater showed the film.

All proceeds from the screening went to the "A Hole in the Roof Foundation" and the "Rabbi Albert Lewis Fund," and the screening was attended by director Jon Avnet and many of the film's stars, including Laurence Fishburne, Martin Landau, Bradley Whitford, and Melinda McGraw.

Also, as the movie states, a year after Albom's book was first released, came Pastor Covington's unexpected death (12.21.2010). Albom, as stated at the end of the movie, delivered his eulogy.
