= David Esbjornson =

American theatre director

- Education: Gustavus Adolphus College (BA); New York University (MFA)
- Occupation: Theatre director

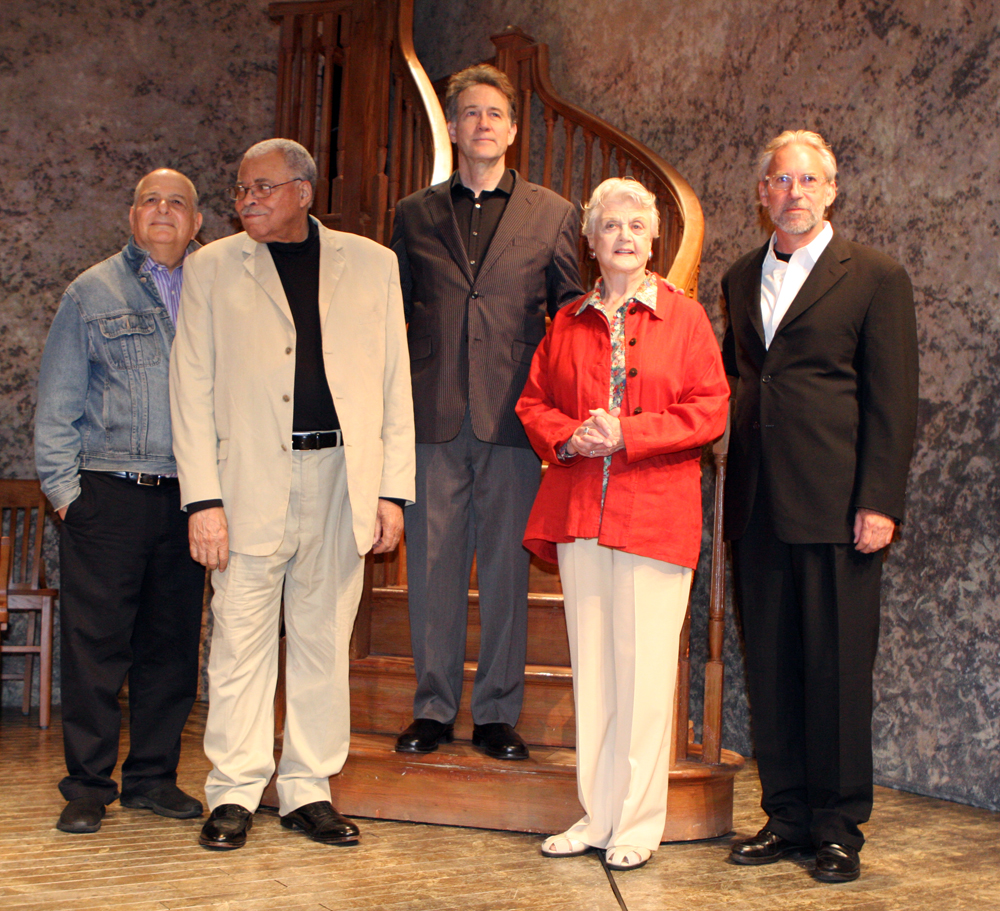
David Esbjornson standing far right

David Esbjornson is a director and producer who has worked throughout the United States in regional theatres and on Broadway, and has established strong and productive relationships with some of the profession's top playwrights, actors, and companies. Esbjornson was the artistic director of Seattle Repertory Theatre in Seattle, Washington, but left that position in summer 2008.

For seven years (1992–1999) he was artistic director of New York City's Classic Stage Company, and since leaving that post, he has become one of the country's most sought-after freelance directors. With a list of production credits steeped in the classics from those years at CSC and as a guest director in such leading regional theatres as the Guthrie Theater, Esbjornson has also established himself as an interpreter of choice for playwrights such as Tony Kushner, Edward Albee, and Arthur Miller.

He holds an MFA from New York University, and a BA in Theatre and English from Gustavus Adolphus College in Minnesota.

== Credits ==
Esbjornson has staged Shakespeare's Much Ado About Nothing (starring Jimmy Smits, Kirsten Johnson, and Sam Waterston) in Central Park and Larry Kramer's The Normal Heart, both at New York City's Joseph Papp Public Theater. Other recent credits include the world premieres of Edward Albee's Tony Award-winning play The Goat, or Who is Sylvia? on Broadway, Neil Simon's Rose and Walsh at the Geffen Theatre in Los Angeles, Arthur Miller's Resurrection Blues at the Guthrie, and Mitch Albom and Jeffrey Hatcher's Tuesdays With Morrie at the Minetta Lane in New York. Among his New York premieres are Edward Albee's The Play About the Baby, Israel Horovitz's My Old Lady, and the Tony-nominated The Ride Down Mt. Morgan, by Arthur Miller at the Public Theater and on Broadway (FANY Award for outstanding direction).

Among the world premieres to Esbjornson's credit are the first production of Tony Kushner's Angels in America: Millennium Approaches, and the first staged presentation of Perestroika, both at the Eureka Theatre in San Francisco, which received seven Bay Area Theatre Critics’ Awards, including best direction and best production.

Other world premieres include Suzan-Lori Parks' In the Blood for the Public Theater, and Part 1 of Tony Kushner's Homebody/Kabul for the Chelsea Center in London. Recent productions directed by Esbjornson include the Maria Irene Fornes plays Mud and Drowning for the Signature Theatre; Who's Afraid of Virginia Woolf?, Hedda Gabler, Summer and Smoke and The Great Gatsby for the Guthrie Theater; and the musical Eliot Ness in Cleveland for the Cleveland Play House. Additional credits include the American premiere of Patrick Marber's Dealer's Choice at the Long Wharf Theatre (five Connecticut Critics Circle Awards, including best direction and best production); Jose Rivera's The Street of the Sun for the Mark Taper Forum; Farmyard at New York Theatre Workshop (New Directors Award); Kevin Kling's Home and Away at Second Stage (Outer Critics Circle nomination); and the world premieres of Larry Kramer's Just Say No at the WPA Theatre and Reynolds Price's trilogy New Music for the Cleveland Play House.

Esbjornson has served as a resident director at the O'Neill Playwrights Conference, New Harmony Project, and the Iowa Playwrights Festival. He received a 1989 NEA-TCG Directing Fellowship, and is on the Board of ART/NY.

== Awards ==
Classic Stage Company received the Lucille Lortel Award for Body of Work in 1999 at the end of Esbjornson's tenure as artistic director. During his time at CSC, he directed many productions for the theatre, including Neal Bell's Thérèse Raquin (OBIE Award for Outstanding Direction), Beckett’s Endgame (Drama Desk nomination for Best Revival), Ellen McLaughlin's Iphigenia and Other Daughters (Drama Desk nomination for Outstanding Direction), John Osborne's The Entertainer (Drama League nomination for Best Revival), and Joe Orton's Entertaining Mr Sloane (Lucille Lortel Award and Drama League nomination for Best Revival).
