= Albert L. Lewis =

American rabbi

Rabbi Albert L. Lewis
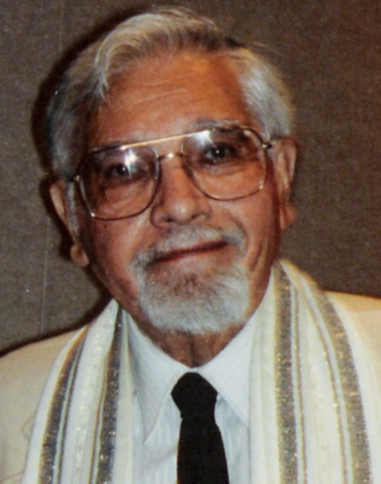

Personal life
- Born: July 6, 1917 New York
- Died: February 10, 2008 (aged 90) Cherry Hill, New Jersey

Religious life
- Religion: Judaism
- Temple: Temple Beth Sholom
- Ordination: Jewish Theological Seminary of America

Jewish leader
- Previous post: Temple Beth Sholom

Rabbi Albert L. Lewis (Hebrew: הרב אברהם אריה בן חיים יוסף ושרה בילא; July 6, 1917 – February 10, 2008) was a leading American Conservative rabbi, scholar, and author; President of the Rabbinical Assembly (RA), the international organization of Conservative rabbis; and vice-president of The World Council of Synagogues. In 2009, the award-winning author, Mitch Albom, wrote about Lewis, his childhood rabbi, as the main character in the non-fiction book, Have a Little Faith. The book, hailed as a story of faith that inspires faith in others, concludes with the eulogy that Albom delivered at Lewis's funeral, on February 12, 2008.

Lewis received a bachelor's degree (A.B.) in education from Yeshiva College (Yeshiva University); a master's degree (M.S.) in education from City College of New York; and a master's degree (M.H.L.) in Hebrew literature, a doctorate (D.H.L., honoris causa) in Rabbinic Studies, and rabbinic ordination, from the Jewish Theological Seminary of America (JTS). He continued his studies at Dropsie College in Philadelphia, and, well known for the power of his sermons and his skills as an orator, taught homiletics in the JTS rabbinical school for ten years.

== Life and works ==
=== Synagogue and outreach ===
A descendant of a number of European rabbis, Lewis grew up in the Bronx, first working as a teacher in New York City, and then as principal at a yeshiva in Brighton Beach, Brooklyn. In 1948, while still in rabbinical school, Lewis became the student rabbi and spiritual leader of a 50-family congregation, Temple Beth Sholom, in Haddon Heights, New Jersey, an area that did not allow Jews until after World War II. He never left that synagogue, and when he retired in 1992, four years after the synagogue had relocated to Cherry Hill, the congregation had grown under his leadership by a factor of twenty, to include approximately one thousand families. In addition to Mitch Albom, the long list of other students Lewis taught during his almost six decades with the synagogue includes Steven Spielberg and Eugene Maurice Orowitz, better known by his screen name, Michael Landon.

In New Jersey, Lewis served on the board of the Bureau of Jewish Education of Camden, New Jersey, and as president of the Tri-County Board of Rabbis (TCBOR), a regional group representing Camden, Burlington, and Gloucester counties, composed of rabbis from all movements within Judaism. Together with Rabbi Max Weine, he founded two educational programs that brought together children and young adults from many of the local synagogues: the Inter-Congregation Hebrew High School (ICHHS), and Midrashah, continuing religious education classes for graduates of the ICHHS. Both of these programs continue as collaborative efforts involving a number of rabbis, cantors, and teachers throughout the region, with classes meeting at participating synagogues and other Jewish institutions, helping to strengthen and foster cooperation and closer ties within the larger Jewish community. He was also a strong voice in interfaith affairs, maintaining close ties with the Catholic Diocese of Camden, and pioneering outreach efforts to local church and religious groups, welcoming visiting classes into the synagogue, to learn more about Judaism. For fifteen years, he also served as an auxiliary chaplain at the Camden County Mental Hospital.

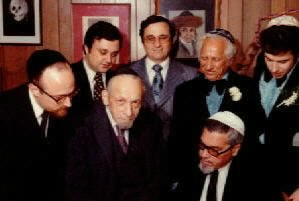
Lewis (seated, right) witnessing a ketubah, Jewish marriage document, 1974

During his tenure at Temple Beth Sholom, he served in a number of positions for major organizations of Conservative Judaism, including service on the Rabbinic Placement Commission of the Rabbinical Assembly, on the Education Commission of the United Synagogue of Conservative Judaism (USCJ), and five years as chairman of the National Youth Commission for the USCJ. In 1956, he led the first United Synagogue Youth (USY) pilgrimage to Europe and Israel—a group of eleven students that launched a program that now counts thousands of students among its past participants -- continuing to lead pilgrimages for students and for adults to Israel, Europe, and Russia for many years thereafter. In 1967, shortly following the Six-Day War, he took a year-long sabbatical in Israel, visiting Egypt to retrace the route of the Biblical Exodus, writing a series of articles for Christian readers, in addition to the synagogue bulletins he wrote for his congregation, and teaching at Oranim Academic College.

In 1963, Lewis accepted the invitation of JTS Chancellor Louis Finkelstein to serve in the newly created post of Rabbinic Tutor to participants in The Institute for Religious and Social Studies (IRSS). Established in 1938, the IRSS was an early, ground-breaking interfaith effort that brought together scholars and leaders in areas that spanned religion, economics, government, business, and science—across faith lines—for weekly sessions of discussion and study. Because of the importance of this program, Finkelstein had decided that rabbis who could best explain "the philosophy and beliefs" of Judaism should be hand-picked to participate. Lewis's responsibilities, as outlined in the letters he received from JTS and the RA, would include "making pertinent comments...asking helpful questions...[and]serving as a resource person," both during the sessions and during the meals, where he would be seated "at a strategic place," so that all could "take full advantage of...[his] presence."

Throughout his career, he remained a strong supporter of JTS, voting against the admission of the first female applicant to the Rabbinical Assembly in 1984—despite his strong support for the ordination and equal rights of women in Judaism—because he ultimately decided to side with the rabbis who felt that the first woman rabbi to be admitted to the RA should be one who was ordained by JTS.

=== Rabbinical Assembly ===
While serving as President of the Rabbinical Assembly from 1988 to 1990, Lewis oversaw a major expansion of RA efforts to train Conservative rabbis to support religious ritual needs, such as the preparation of gittin, religious divorce decrees. Additionally, classes were begun for religiously committed doctors within the movement, training them to perform Brit milah, ritual circumcision, and efforts were initiated to support synagogues considering the addition of a mikva, a ritual bath. These moves were seen as important steps to strengthen the Conservative movement on a national scale, diminishing the community's reliance on Orthodox rabbis, especially at a time, according to Lewis, when the gap between movements was growing, and Orthodox rabbis were becoming more reluctant to support the needs of non-Orthodox Jews. Lewis referred to these initiatives as part of the "maturing" of the Conservative movement, and said that, while there were some communities where Modern Orthodox rabbis still offered their "full cooperation" in matters of life-cycle rituals, the situation had been exacerbated by the Who is a Jew? controversy in Israel, where Orthodox rabbis were refusing to accept anyone converted under non-Orthodox auspices as Jewish.

Another major change in the RA Lewis oversaw as president was the inclusion of Hungarian and Czechoslovak rabbis in the organization. Lewis hailed this expansion as a move "in the spirit of glasnost," saying it presaged a new resurgency of Eastern European Jewry decimated at the hands of Nazism. The inclusion of these Eastern European rabbis, which included an exchange of educational materials and teachers, would lead to a dramatic transformation of the group into a truly international organization, which today includes rabbis from Eastern and Western Europe, North and South America, Israel, Australia, and Asia.

Additionally, on the national level, the RA became one of the few religious organizations of that time to take strong positions on government ethics, passing a resolution in 1989 to support a "significant pay increase" for members of the Senate and House of Representatives, contingent on the passage of a prohibition of speaking fees or other honoraria for congressional members.

=== Journalism and writing ===
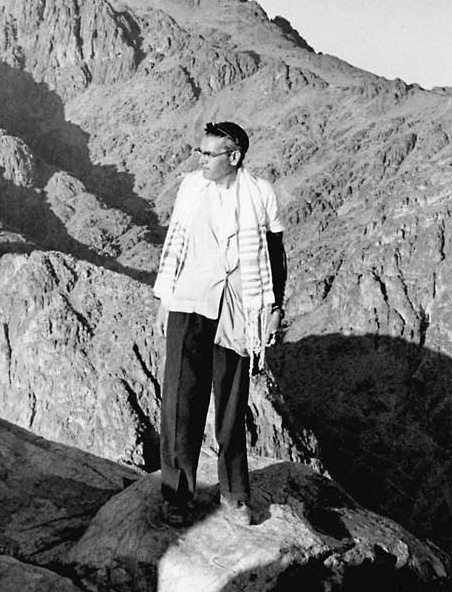
Near Mount Sinai, Saint Catherine, Egypt, 1968

Lewis served as correspondent for The Catholic Star Herald, writing a series of articles for that paper during his sabbatical year in Israel. His articles, often accompanied by photographs he took during his travels, were introduced to readers on Oct 20, 1967, with Lewis's promise of "honest and objective reporting, and not propaganda," stating that he would "try to present the feel or mood of Israel as accurately as possible.” During his time in Egypt he traveled on press credentials for the Catholic paper, as Dr. Albert Lewis, in areas where it would likely have been problematic, and possibly even dangerous, to travel as an American Jew or rabbi, so soon after the end of the Six-Day War.

Lewis wrote a comprehensive history and explanation of the Shofar, the ram's horn used as a part of traditional Jewish worship before and during the High Holy Days, for the Encyclopedia Judaica. This article, attributed to Lewis as the author, was listed as a reference in a corresponding article in the Encyclopaedia Islamica.

Many of Lewis's sermons were quoted by Jewish and Christian colleagues in their talks and synagogue or church bulletins and newsletters, and a number of his articles were published or reprinted in Jewish newspapers and periodicals, including the Jewish Magazine. He was the author of two books, So It Isn't Perfect (1967), and What's Your Glory? (1984).

The Hebrew prayerbook, Vaani T'Fillati, Siddur Yisraeli, published in Israel in 2009 for the Masorti (Conservative) movement, is dedicated in his memory.

=== The Singing Rabbi ===
With all of his outside achievements, it was his work with the men, women, and children of his synagogue that seemed to fuel his life, as recounted in Albom's book. Referred to as "the Reb," a term of affection and endearment for rabbi, he in turn referred to his congregation as a Kehillah Kedoshah, a sacred community. His synagogue was well known as a model of what was called a "heimish" (homey) synagogue, welcoming in congregants as valued members of a close synagogue family. Early on during his career, he had been described as a "rare blend of modern prophet and humorist," teaching through stories filled with humor and moral truth. Even when he was on vacation, including once when he used that vacation time to serve as a cruise chaplain on board the Holland America Line's SS Maasdam, he would write synagogue bulletin articles so that congregants could learn from his time away from them.

Lewis and his wife, Sarah, and their children, Shalom, Orah, and Gilah, were constant role models for Jewishly-committed families, with Sarah's contributions to synagogue and larger Jewish community life notable in their own right. Over the years, Lewis helped inspire eight members of the congregation, six men and two women, to become Orthodox, Conservative, and Reform rabbis. In addition, his son, Shalom, went on to serve as a rabbi of a Conservative synagogue. Shortly after Lewis's death, an annual memorial lecture was established at Temple Beth Sholom in his memory, with Mitch Albom as the first guest lecturer, in 2009, returning for the 2010 lecture in dialogue with Rabbi David Wolpe, "to memorialize their teacher and friend."

Albom describes Lewis as "the singing rabbi," using song in a literal sense, in sermons and even in conversation, and in a larger sense, as part of a life "sung" with joy and imbued with faith. Albom quotes Lewis's stated "secret to happiness" as the ability to feel satisfaction and gratitude: to face life with thanksgiving. Observers reported that Lewis continued to offer pastoral care and comfort—and even a word of song—during the last days of his life, in conversations with hospital workers who would come to him to hear his stories or ask for his blessing. At his funeral, those in attendance were surprised to hear a final taped message from Lewis, teaching and comforting his congregants even after his death. The message touched on his beliefs in God's existence and human immortality, included an expression of gratitude for the "great experience" of having been with his friends, family, and congregants during his lifetime—and then the singing rabbi ended with words from a song: Shalom, Haverim: Farewell, friends.

== Have a Little Faith ==
Already famous for such works as Tuesdays with Morrie and The Five People You Meet in Heaven, author Mitch Albom (Mitchel David "Mitch" Albom) explains that this book began with the request by Lewis, his childhood rabbi, to write and deliver the eulogy when the time came for the rabbi's funeral. Albom agreed, contingent on an agreement that he could begin a series of interviews and conversations, in order to get to know Lewis as a man, not just as a rabbi.

His conversations with Lewis eventually led to an increased interest in Albom's part in the power and meaning of faith in a larger sense. In his hometown of Detroit, Albom forged a link with Pastor Henry Covington, an African-American Protestant minister at the I Am My Brother's Keeper Church. Covington, a past drug-addict, dealer, and ex-convict, was ministering to the needs of his down-and-out parishioners, in an urban church serving a largely homeless congregation. The book draws upon Albom's awakened interest in faith, and in men like Lewis and Covington, who taught others its value, not only through their words, but also through their lives.

Albom has told interviewers that he believes that the reason Lewis asked him to deliver the eulogy may actually have been a way to draw him back to the roots of his own faith, and "back to God a little bit."

== Have a Little Faith (movie) ==
In June 2011, an announcement was made that the book would be filmed as a made-for-television movie, scheduled for release during the 2011 Christmas season. Martin Landau has been cast in the role of Albert Lewis, and Laurence Fishburne has been cast as Henry Covington. The film will be produced by Hallmark Hall of Fame and directed by Jon Avnet with a screenplay by Mitch Albom. The film, also starring Bradley Whitford as Albom, began filming in Detroit in June 2011.

The film had a "world premiere charity screening" November 16, 2011, in Royal Oak, Michigan, near Detroit. All ten theaters within the Emogine multiplex theater showed the film, with proceeds benefiting the "A Hole in the Roof Foundation" and the "Rabbi Albert Lewis Fund." The television movie had its television premiere on ABC Sunday November 27, 2011, the Sunday of Thanksgiving weekend.

== Books ==
- So It Isn't Perfect, Huntzinger Press, Camden, New Jersey:1967
- What's Your Glory?, privately published by Rabbi Albert L. Lewis, 1984
