= TBS GB =

UK healthcare services company

TBS Group Of Company
- Company type: Private
- Industry: Business service, Training & Consultancy
- Founded: 2015; 11 years ago
- Headquarters: Silsoe, Bedfordshire, UK
- Revenue: 3750000
- Website: http://www.tbsgb.com/

TBS GB (Telematic and Biomedical Services Great Britain) is the UK arm of the ITAL TBS group of companies. ITAL TBS is a provider of healthcare and clinical engineering in Europe, with total revenue of US$200 million in 2006. The company is privately owned; shareholders include GE, the Generali group and the company managers.

== History ==
ITAL TBS was established in the 1980s as an advanced research provider in a research environment. In 2004 the company acquired the clinical engineering arm of GE Healthcare in Europe.
