= Rosolino Paternò, soldato... =

- Directed by: Nanni Loy
- Written by: Agenore Incrocci; Furio Scarpelli
- Produced by: Dino de Laurentiis Cinematografica
- Starring: Nino Manfredi; Jason Robards; Martin Landau
- Cinematography: Tonino Delli Colli
- Edited by: Ruggero Mastroianni
- Music by: Carlo Rustichelli
- Distributed by: Allied Artists Pictures
- Release date: 1970
- Country: Italy
- Language: English

Rosolino Paternò, soldato... (also known as Operation Snafu and Situation Normal: A.F.U.) is a 1970 Italian comedy film. The film stars Martin Landau, Jason Robards, and Peter Falk. In the title role is Nino Manfredi.

== Plot ==
Sicily, 1943, before the Allied assault in July. A pair of American commandos parachute inside the island for a secret mission. They are asked to check on the German weapons and positions before the assault. Along the way, they meet a wounded Italian prisoner of war. He agrees to help them complete their mission, provided there are no bumps in the road and no Germans thrown in.

== Cast ==
- Nino Manfredi as Rosolino Paternò
- Jason Robards as Sam Armstrong
- Martin Landau as Joe Mellone
- Peter Falk as Peter Pawney
- Scott Hylands as Reginald Wollington
- Milena Vukotic as Rosolino's wife
- Frank Latimore as the American Lieutenant
- Anthony Dawson as the Italian General
- Slim Pickens as General Maxwell
- Lorenza Guerrieri as Vincenzina Puglisi
- Renzo Marignano
- Mario Maranzana
- Orso Maria Guerrini

== Production ==
The project was first mooted several years earlier, with Arthur Hiller initially appointed as director. Its working title was La guerra è l’anima del commercio ('War is the lifeblood of trade'). The film was filmed in Licata and Agrigento; it was shot entirely in English, which proved particularly difficult for lead actor Nino Manfredi, who had very limited English-language skills. The English-language version took its title from the American anacronym during the war used for situational conditions before any sanctioned mission by the military: SNAFU, meaning Situation Normal, All Fucked Up.

== Reception ==
The film was panned by critics but was a major success at the Italian box office, grossing about 1.5 billion lire.
