= A Smile as Big as the Moon =

2012 American television film

- Promotional image
- Genre: Drama
- Based on: A Smile as Big as the Moon by: Mike Kersjes; Joe Layden
- Teleplay by: Thomas Rickman
- Directed by: James Steven Sadwith
- Starring: John Corbett; Jessy Schram; Logan Huffman; Moira Kelly; Cynthia Watros
- Music by: Mark Adler
- Country of origin: United States
- Original language: English

Production
- Executive producers: Brent Shields; Dan Paulson
- Cinematography: Roy H. Wagner
- Editor: Michael Ornstein
- Running time: 96 minutes
- Production company: Hallmark Hall of Fame Productions

Original release
- Network: ABC
- Release: January 29, 2012

A Smile as Big as the Moon is a 2012 American drama television film directed by James Steven Sadwith and written by Thomas Rickman. The film debuted on ABC on January 29, 2012, as an episode of Hallmark Hall of Fame.

John Corbett stars in this film based on the 2002 memoir by teacher Mike Kersjes and Joe Layden. The movie shows the challenges Kersjes faced as he worked to bring out the best from his special education students by taking them to Space Camp, which had, until that time been perceived as a program best suited to advanced science and math students, well beyond the reach of special education students. Several actors playing students in the film have a disability themselves.

== Plot ==
Ben, a student with Down syndrome, in Mike Kersjes's Forest Hills Northern High School, Grand Rapids, Michigan, special education class, dreams of becoming an astronaut. Kersjes, who is also a football coach is inspired to pursue Space Camp for his students. Obstacles mount as school administrators object to the expense and Space Camp officials have no experience with special-ed students. Teacher Robynn McKinney supports Kersjes's efforts.

Eventually the trip is approved by the necessary parties, and Kersjes faces another set of challenges: fundraising, preparing the students for their trip with science and physical education, and battling bullying and belittling from other students. Kersjes engages the football team in these endeavors.

== Filming ==
The film was shot primarily in Wilmington, North Carolina and at United States Space Camp in Huntsville, Alabama. One scene used Sky Theater inside Ingram Planetarium of Sunset Beach, North Carolina, which was adapted to appear as a planetarium would have in 1988. Filming took place there September 28, 2011.

== Cast ==
- John Corbett as Mike Kersjes, a high school special education teacher who takes his class to Space Camp.
- Jessy Schram as Robynn McKinney, Kersjes' co-teacher.
- Cynthia Watros as Dr. Deborah Barnhart
- Logan Huffman as Scott Goudy, a student with dyslexia and anger management problems who hates being in special education.
- Breezy Eslin as Stephanie Reinks, a student with ADD and bipolar disorder. She is also never one to let anything slide.
- Abigale Coorigan as Lisa Casey, a student with ADHD and OCD. She is also the class tattletale.
- Peter ten Brink as Ben Schmidt, a student with Down syndrome.
- David Lambert as Steve Bennett, a student with ADHD and Tourette syndrome. He is the most hyperactive student in the class.
- Jimmy Bellinger as Matt Snyder, a student with autism. He is a whiz of mathematics and science.
- Kesun Loder (K'Sun Ray) as Lewis Dayhuff, a student with dyslexia. He lives with his 13th foster family and has a hot temper.
- Tyrin Niles Wyche as Jamal Davis, a student who is mentally slow and slow to get agitated. He is the most quiet student.
- Tanner Dow as Adam Plowright, a student with autism and OCD. He is the class gentle giant with a "heart that matches his size".
- E. Roger Mitchell as Tom Keller, Forest Hills Northern High School's principal.
- Keith Flippen as Dennis Schmidt, Ben Schmidt's father.
- Moira Kelly as Darcy Kersjes, Mike Kersjes' wife.
- Mike Pniewski as Big Dan, the owner of Big Dan's Burger Shed.
- Louise Linton as Julie, the counselor for the team "Big Dan's Burger Shed".
- Fred Griffith as Judge
