= Tuesdays with Morrie =

1997 memoir by Mitch Albom

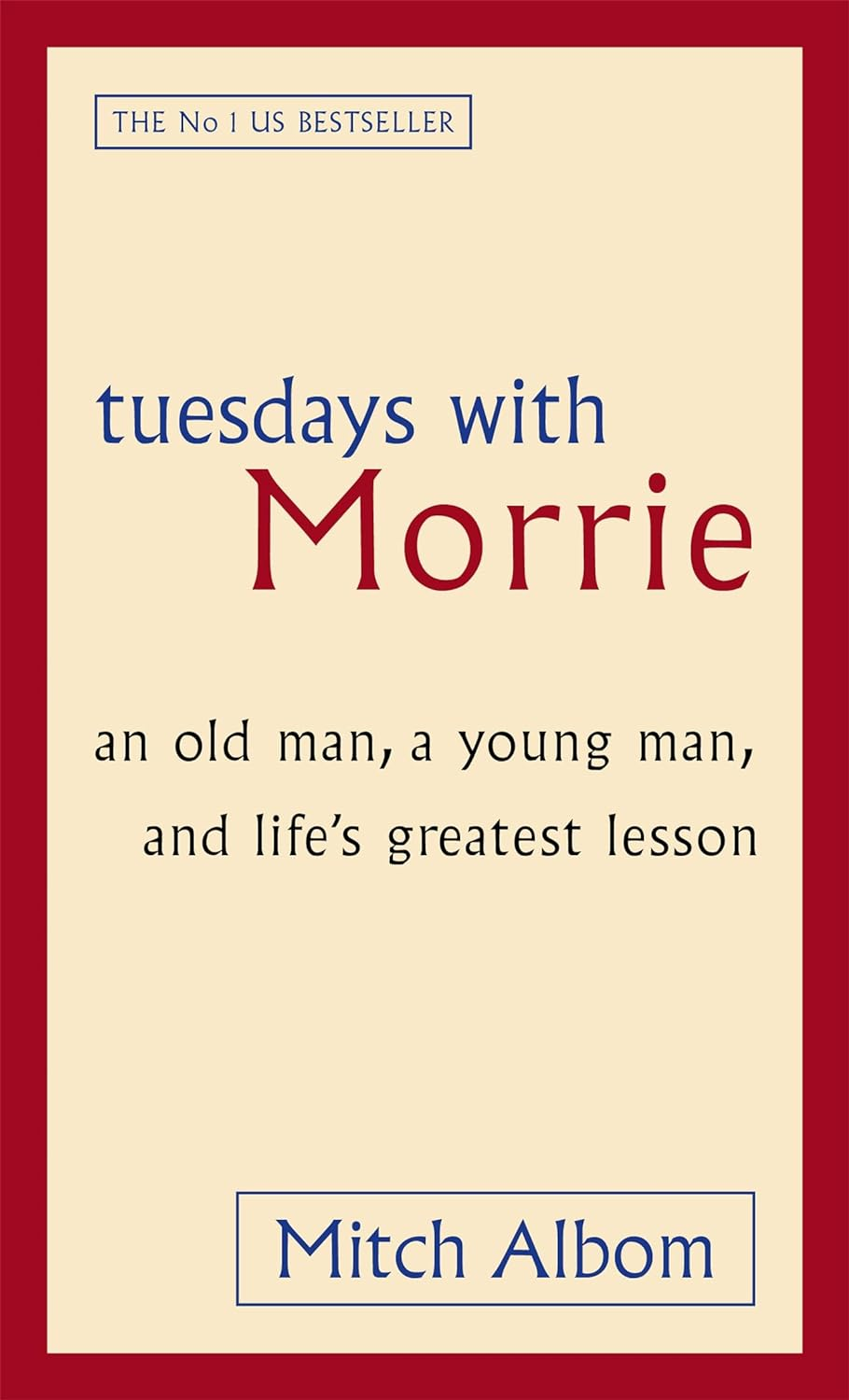
- Author: Mitch Albom
- Language: English
- Genre: Memoir
- Publisher: Doubleday
- Publication date: August 18, 1997
- Publication place: United States
- Pages: 192
- ISBN: 0-385-48451-8
- OCLC: 36130729
- Followed by: The Five People You Meet in Heaven

Tuesdays with Morrie: An Old Man, A Young Man and Life's Greatest Lesson is a 1997 memoir by American author Mitch Albom about a series of visits he made to his former Brandeis University sociology professor, Morrie Schwartz, as Schwartz was dying from amyotrophic lateral sclerosis (ALS). The book was written in part to help defray Schwartz's medical bills. Originally printed in a run of 20,000 copies, it became a number-one New York Times bestseller and spent over four years on the list. It has sold over 17 million copies worldwide and has been translated into more than 45 languages, making it one of the bestselling memoirs of all time.

== Background ==
Albom, then an award-winning sports columnist for the Detroit Free Press, had studied under Schwartz at Brandeis in the late 1970s but lost contact with his professor after graduation. In 1995, Albom saw Schwartz being interviewed by Ted Koppel on Nightline about his experience living with ALS and was moved to reconnect. The Nightline interviews had themselves been prompted by a March 1995 Boston Globe feature by Jack Thomas titled "A Professor's Final Course: His Own Death." Koppel conducted three interviews with Schwartz for Nightline over the course of 1995.

A coincidental newspaper strike at the Detroit Free Press freed Albom's schedule, allowing him to fly to Massachusetts every week to visit Schwartz. Albom originally conceived the book as a way to help pay for Schwartz's mounting end-of-life medical expenses, which were substantial because Schwartz wished to die at home rather than in a hospital. Schwartz died on November 4, 1995.

== Synopsis ==
The book is structured around fourteen Tuesday visits that Albom makes to Schwartz's home in West Newton, Massachusetts. Albom frames the visits as a "last class" with his old professor, with the book serving as a "term paper." Each chapter covers a different topic of conversation — including death, fear, aging, greed, marriage, family, forgiveness, and the meaning of life — interspersed with Albom's reflections on his own career-driven lifestyle and flashbacks to his college years. The narrative also tracks Schwartz's physical decline from ALS alongside his continuing engagement with ideas and people.

== Reception ==
=== Sales and popularity ===
The initial printing was 20,000 copies. After a brief appearance on The Oprah Winfrey Show boosted sales, the book entered the New York Times bestseller list in October 1997 and reached the number-one position six months later. It spent 206 weeks on the New York Times Non-Fiction Bestsellers List. By 2022, it had sold over 17 million copies worldwide and been translated into more than 45 languages. The book has been widely adopted in university curricula, used as required reading in courses on death and dying, psychology, sociology, and ethics at institutions including Iowa State University, Syracuse University, and the University of Iowa. It is referenced as a gift given to Elena Molokova by American financier and activist Bill Browder in his memoir Red Notice, sparking their romance.

=== Critical response ===
Kirkus Reviews described the book as "sincere, sentimental, and skillful," noting that it stopped "just short of the maudlin and the mawkish," and suggested placing it "under the heading 'Inspirational.'" Writing in The New York Times, Alain de Botton acknowledged the book's "true and sometimes touching pieces of advice" and the "obvious charm and good nature of both author and subject," but argued that the insights did not amount to a wise book, writing that "just as a well-meaning statement like 'We should all live in peace' doesn't help avert wars, Tuesdays with Morrie finally fails to enlighten." The Los Angeles Times was more favorable, calling it "a wonderful book, a story of the heart told by a writer with soul," while the Philadelphia Inquirer called it "a gift to mankind" and the Boston Globe termed it "an extraordinary contribution to the literature of death." USA Today praised its accessible style, writing that the book was "as sweet and nourishing as fresh summer corn" and "begs to be read aloud."

== Editions ==
The book was originally published by Doubleday on August 18, 1997. An unabridged audiobook, narrated by Albom, includes excerpts from audio recordings he made during his original conversations with Schwartz. A twentieth-anniversary edition with a new afterword by Albom was published by Broadway Books in 2017, and a twenty-fifth anniversary edition followed in 2022.

== Adaptations ==
The book was adapted into a 1999 television film directed by Mick Jackson, produced by Oprah Winfrey, and starring Jack Lemmon as Schwartz and Hank Azaria as Albom. The film won an Emmy Award.

Albom and playwright Jeffrey Hatcher adapted the book as a stage play, which premiered at Vassar College on June 21, 2002, before an Off-Broadway run at the Minetta Lane Theatre beginning November 19, 2002, directed by David Esbjornson and starring Alvin Epstein as Schwartz and Jon Tenney as Albom. The play has since been produced in hundreds of regional and international productions. A 2024 revival starring Len Cariou as Schwartz was presented at St. George's Episcopal Church in New York.

== See also ==
- Morrie Schwartz
- Mitch Albom
- The Five People You Meet in Heaven
