= The Five People You Meet in Heaven =

2003 novel by Mitch Albom

- Cover of the novel's first edition
- Author: Mitch Albom
- Cover artist: Philip Rosemary
- Genre: Religious fiction, Science fiction
- Publisher: Hyperion, Penguin Random House
- Publication date: 2003
- Media type: Print
- Pages: 208
- ISBN: 978-0-786-86871-1
- OCLC: 526197956
- LC Class: PS3601.L3357

The Five People You Meet In Heaven is a 2003 novel by Mitch Albom. It follows the life and death of a ride mechanic named Eddie (inspired by Albom's uncle), who is killed in an amusement park accident and sent to heaven, where he encounters five people who had a significant impact on him while he was alive (or someone on whom his life had a significant impact). It was published by Hyperion and remained on the New York Times Best Seller list for 95 weeks.

== Plot ==
On his 83rd birthday, amusement park ride mechanic Eddie is killed in an accident when a ride breaks down. During the accident, he makes a desperate attempt to save the life of a little girl named Annie.

Eddie arrives in Heaven, where he meets "the Blue Man." The Blue Man explains that Eddie is about to journey through Heaven's five levels, meeting someone who has had a significant impact upon his life or someone on whom his life had a significant impact. Eddie asks why the Blue Man is his first person, and he informs Eddie that, when Eddie was very young, he caused the car accident that killed him. From this, Eddie learns his first lesson: there are no random events in life and all individuals and experiences are connected in some way.

Eddie meets his former captain from the army, who reminds Eddie of their time together as prisoners of war in a forced labor camp in the Philippines. Their group burned the camp during their escape and Eddie, while running away, remembers seeing a shadow move in one of the huts. The Captain confesses that he shot Eddie in the leg to prevent Eddie from chasing the shadow into the fire. This saved Eddie's life despite leaving him with a lifelong severe limp. Eddie then learns how the Captain died: he stepped on a land mine that would have killed all the men had he not set it off.

Eddie finds himself outside a diner, where he sees his father through a window. A well-dressed woman named Ruby appears and introduces herself to him. Ruby explains that Ruby Pier was named after her by her husband Emile, who built it in tribute to her. Ruby shows Eddie the true cause of his father's death, which is different from what he had always believed. She tells Eddie that he needs to forgive his father.

Eddie meets his late wife, Marguerite. They remember their wedding, and Marguerite teaches Eddie that love is never lost in death; it just moves on and takes a different form.

Eddie awakens to see children playing along with a riverbed. A young Filipina girl named Tala comes up to him. Tala reveals that she was the little girl from the hut that Eddie set on fire. Distraught, Eddie breaks down both cursing and asking God "why?" Tala hands him a stone and asks him to "wash" her like the other children in the river are doing to one another. Eddie is puzzled, but dips the stone in the water and starts to scrape off the injuries he had inflicted on her. Tala's wounds begin to clear until she is freed of all the scars. Eddie asks Tala if she knows if he was able to save the little girl before his death. Tala tells him he did manage to push her out of the way. In this way, Tala explains, he also managed to atone every day for her unnecessary death.

In the end, it shows that Eddie's Heaven is the Stardust Band Shell, where he met Marguerite. Later, the Freddie Free Fall's name was changed and it becomes a badge of courage which attracts many tourists to try.

== Major characters ==
- Eddie: The protagonist; at the start of the story, he is killed on his 83rd birthday.
- Marguerite: Eddie's wife whom he met at Ruby Pier and married after returning from World War II.
- Joseph Corvelzchik (the Blue Man): Joseph is the first man Eddie meets in Heaven. His skin had been turned blue when he was a boy because of the repeated ingestion of silver nitrate, thought to be an effective medication at the time.
- The Captain: Eddie's commanding officer during the war.
- Ruby: A middle-aged widow for whom Ruby Pier is named by her fiancé Emile.
- Emile: Ruby's husband, who also created the original Ruby Pier.
- Mickey Shea: An alcoholic Irishman, the longtime close friend of Eddie's mother and father. Mickey is impulsive, festive, and lonely. Mickey helps Eddie's father get his job at Ruby Pier, and when Eddie is born, he gives his parents money to help with their financial struggles.
- Tala: Eddie's fifth person in heaven, a little Filipino girl who Eddie unknowingly killed while he and his unit are escaping captivity during the war. Tala is affectionate, trusting, and wise. Following her mother's instructions, Tala hides from Eddie and his men in one of the abandoned village huts.
- Nicky: Mentioned only briefly, a teenage boy who frequently visits Ruby Pier. Nicky turns out to be the grandson of Ruby, for whom the amusement park was named. Nicky loses his car key on the ride "Freddy's Free Fall" a few weeks before Eddie dies.

== Reception ==
Janet Maslin, writing in The New York Times, gave a cynical review, calling the story "a string of reassuring verities." While she thought the story manipulative, she acknowledged its power to comfort people. Publishers Weekly's review was far more positive, comparing the book favorably to A Christmas Carol and saying it would be "cherished by a vast readership."

== Adaptation ==
A made-for-television film adaptation of the novel, produced by Hallmark Entertainment, directed by Lloyd Kramer, and filmed in Vancouver, British Columbia, premiered on ABC in 2004. Jon Voight starred as Eddie, with Ellen Burstyn as Ruby and Jeff Daniels as the Blue Man. The New York Times gave the film a negative review, calling it too slow-paced and overly sentimental. The review suggested the film was only made due to the success of Tuesdays With Morrie, another film based on an Albom novel.
