= Mitch Albom =

American author and journalist (born 1958)

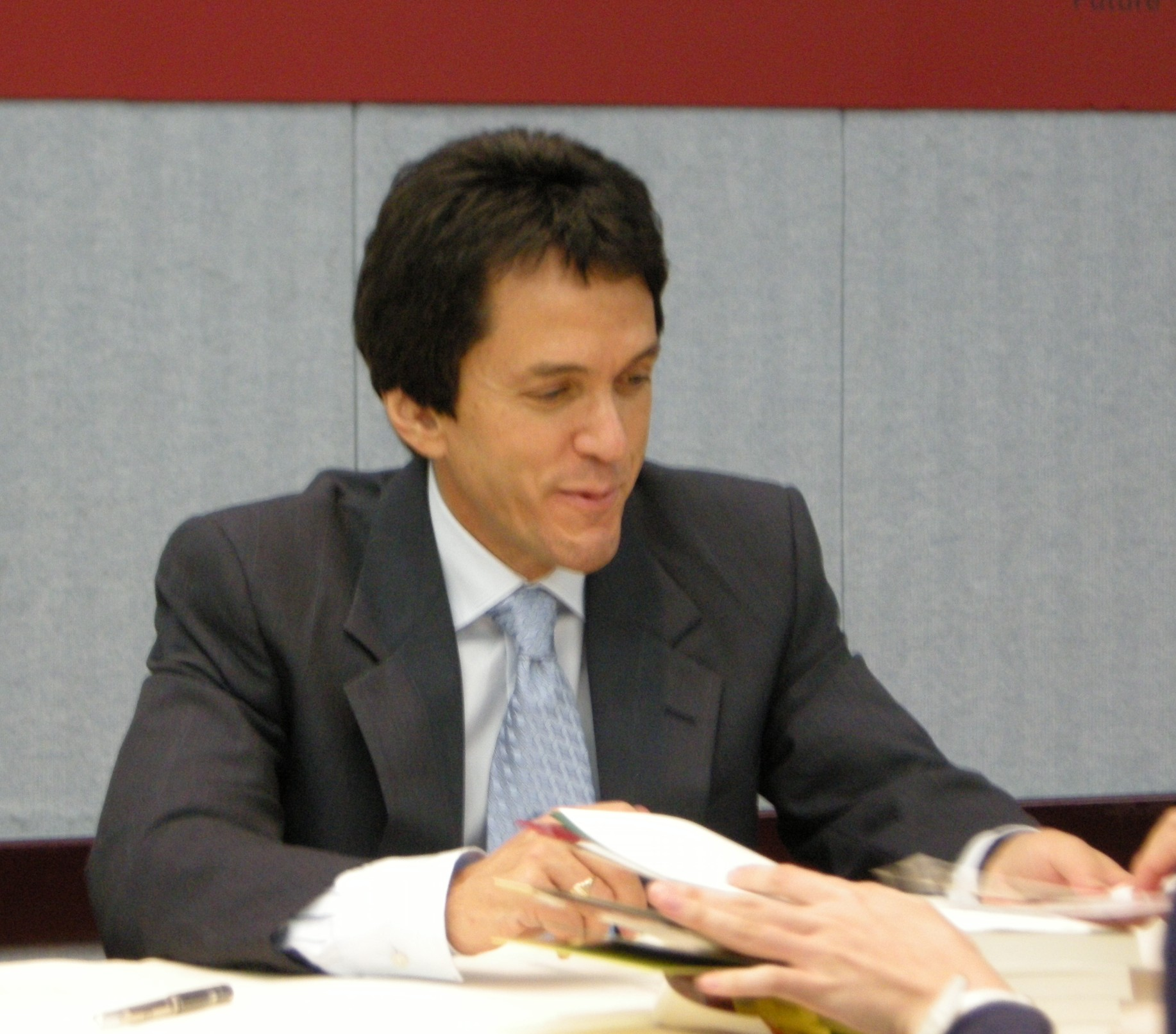
- Albom in 2010
- Born: May 23, 1958 (age 68); Passaic, New Jersey, U.S.
- Education: Brandeis University (BA); Columbia University (MA, MBA)
- Occupations: Novelist; sports journalist; radio talk show host; musician
- Spouse: Janine Sabino (m. 1995)
- Writing career
- Genres: Non-fiction; Fiction
- Notable works: Tuesdays with Morrie; The Five People You Meet in Heaven; Have a Little Faith; For One More Day; Finding Chika; Columnist for the Detroit Free Press
- Website: mitchalbom.com

Mitchell David Albom (born May 23, 1958) is an American author, sports journalist, talk show host, and philanthropist. As of 2021, his books are reported to have sold 40 million copies worldwide. Having achieved national recognition as a sports journalist early on in his writing career, Albom turned to writing inspirational stories and themes—a preeminent early one being Tuesdays with Morrie.

== Early life ==
Albom was born on May 23, 1958, in Passaic, New Jersey; he lived in Buffalo, New York for a little while until his family settled in Oaklyn, New Jersey, just outside Philadelphia. He is Jewish. He graduated from Haddon Township High School in 1976.

Albom earned a bachelor's degree in sociology in 1979 from Brandeis University. After forays into music and journalism, he returned to academia to earn graduate master's degrees in journalism (at Columbia University Graduate School of Journalism), and business (from Columbia University Graduate School of Business). Albom paid his tuition in part through playing the piano.

== Career ==
=== As a columnist ===
While living in New York, Albom developed an interest in journalism. Still supporting himself by working nights in the music industry, he began to write during the day for the Queens Tribune, a weekly newspaper in Flushing, New York. His work there helped earn him entry into the Columbia University Graduate School of Journalism. To help pay his tuition he took work as a babysitter. In addition to nighttime piano playing, Albom took a part-time job with SPORT magazine.

After graduation he freelanced as a sportswriter for Sports Illustrated, GEO, and The Philadelphia Inquirer, and covered Olympic sports events in Europe – including track and field and luge – paying his own way for travel, and selling articles once he was there. In 1983, he was hired as a full-time feature writer for The Fort Lauderdale News and Sun Sentinel, and was eventually promoted to columnist. In 1985, having won that year's Associated Press Sports Editors award for best Sports News Story, Albom was hired as lead sports columnist for the Detroit Free Press to replace Mike Downey, a popular columnist who had taken a job with the Los Angeles Times.

Albom's sports column quickly became popular. In 1989, when the Detroit Free Press and the Detroit News merged weekend publications, Albom was asked to add a weekly non-sports column to his duties. That column ran on Sundays in the "Comment" section and dealt with American life and values. It was eventually syndicated across the country. Both columns continue in the Detroit Free Press.

Many of his columns have been collected into anthology books including Live Albom I (Detroit Free Press, 1988), Live Albom II (Detroit Free Press, 1990), Live Albom III (Detroit Free Press, 1992), and Live Albom IV (Detroit Free Press, 1995).

Albom also serves as a contributing editor to Parade magazine. His column is syndicated by Tribune Content Agency.

==== Game attendance error suspension ====
In 2005, Albom and four editors were briefly suspended from the Detroit Free Press after Albom wrote a column that stated that two college basketball players were in the crowd at an NCAA tournament game when in fact they were not. In a column printed in the April 3, 2005 edition, Albom described two former Michigan State University basketball players, both in the NBA, attending an NCAA Final Four semifinal game on Saturday to cheer for their school. The players had told Albom they planned to attend, so Albom, filing on his normal Friday deadline, but knowing the column could not come out until Sunday (after the game was over) wrote that the players were there. But the players' plans changed at the last minute and they did not attend the game.

Ultimately, The Detroit Free Press suspended the four editors who had read the column and allowed it to go to print. Albom was in attendance at the game, but the columnist failed to check on the two players' presence. A later internal investigation found no other similar instances in Albom's past columns, but did cite an editorial-wide problem of routinely using unattributed quotes from other sources.

Carol Leigh Hutton, publisher of the Detroit Free Press at the time of these events, later told BuzzFeed, that she regretted the way it was handled. "It was a stupid mistake that Mitch made that others failed to catch but not at all indicative of some problem that required the response we gave it. I allowed myself to believe that we were doing this highly credible, highly transparent thing, when really in hindsight what I think we were doing was acquiescing to people who were taking advantage of a stupid mistake."

=== As an author ===
As of 2021, Albom's books had sold over 40 million copies worldwide.

==== Sports volumes ====
Albom's first non-anthology book was Bo: Life, Laughs, and the Lessons of a College Football Legend (Warner Books), an autobiography of football coach Bo Schembechler co-written with the coach. The book was published in August 1989 and became Albom's first New York Times bestseller. Albom's next book was Fab Five: Basketball, Trash Talk, The American Dream, a look into the starters on the University of Michigan men's basketball team that reached the NCAA championship game as freshmen in 1992 and again as sophomores in 1993. The book was published in November 1993 and also became a New York Times bestseller.

==== Tuesdays with Morrie ====
Albom's breakthrough book came about after he was rotating the TV channels and viewed Morrie Schwartz's interview with Ted Koppel on ABC News Nightline in 1995, in which Schwartz, a sociology professor, spoke about living and dying with a terminal disease, ALS (amyotrophic lateral sclerosis, or Lou Gehrig's disease). Albom, who was close to Schwartz during his college years at Brandeis University, felt guilty about not keeping in touch with him so he reconnected with his former professor, visiting him in suburban Boston, and eventually coming every Tuesday for discussions about life and death. Albom, who was seeking a way to pay for Schwartz's medical bills, sought out a publisher for a book about their visits. Although rejected by numerous publishing houses, Doubleday accepted the idea shortly before Schwartz's death, and Albom was able to fulfill his wish to pay for Schwartz's bills.

The resulting book, Tuesdays with Morrie, which chronicled Albom's time spent with his professor, was published in 1997. The initial printing was 20,000 copies. As word of mouth grew, the sales slowly increased, and landed the book a brief appearance on The Oprah Winfrey Show, nudging the book onto the New York Times Best Seller list in October 1997. It steadily climbed higher reaching the number-one position six months later. It remained on the New York Times Best Seller list for 205 weeks. One of the top selling memoirs of all time, Tuesdays With Morrie has sold over 20 million copies and has been translated into 45 languages.

On November 22, 2005, Albom was the sole and final guest on Ted Koppel's farewell appearance on ABC's Nightline.

Oprah Winfrey produced a television movie adaptation by the same name for ABC, starring Hank Azaria as Albom and Jack Lemmon as Morrie. It was the most-watched TV movie of 1999 and won four Emmy Awards.

==== The Five People You Meet in Heaven ====
After the success of Tuesdays with Morrie, Albom's follow-up was the fiction book The Five People You Meet in Heaven (Hyperion Books) which he published in September 2003. It was a fast success and again launched Albom onto the New York Times Best Seller list. The Five People You Meet in Heaven sold over 10 million copies in 38 territories and in 35 languages. In 2004, it became a television movie for ABC, starring Jon Voight, Ellen Burstyn, Michael Imperioli, and Jeff Daniels. Directed by Lloyd Kramer, the film was critically acclaimed and the most watched TV movie of the year with 18.7 million viewers.

==== For One More Day ====
Albom's second novel, For One More Day (Hyperion), was published in 2006. It is about Charley "Chick" Benetto, a retired baseball player who, facing the pain of unrealized dreams, alcoholism, divorce, and an estrangement from his grown daughter, returns to his childhood home and attempts suicide; there, he meets his long dead mother, who welcomes him as if nothing ever happened, and in this way, the book explores the question, "What would you do if you had one more day with someone you've lost?".

The hardcover edition of For One More Day spent nine months on the New York Times Best Seller list after debuting at the top spot, and reached No. 1 on the USA Today and Publishers Weekly bestseller lists. It has been translated into 26 languages. It was the first book to be sold by Starbucks in the launch of the Book Break Program in the fall of 2006.

On December 9, 2007, ABC television aired the two-hour television event motion picture Oprah Winfrey Presents: Mitch Albom's For One More Day, which starred Michael Imperioli and Ellen Burstyn. Burstyn received a Screen Actors Guild Award nomination for her performance in the role of Posey Benetto. Albom has said his relationship with his own mother was largely behind the story of that book, and that several incidents in For One More Day are actual events from his childhood.

==== Have a Little Faith ====
Have a Little Faith, Albom's first nonfiction book since Tuesdays With Morrie, was released on September 29, 2009, through Hyperion publishing, and recounts Albom's experiences that led to him writing the eulogy for Albert L. Lewis, his rabbi who headed a synagogue in Haddon Heights, New Jersey, a town adjacent to Haddon Township, where Albom grew up. The synagogue later moved to Cherry Hill. The book is written in the same vein as Tuesdays With Morrie, in which the main character, Mitch, goes through several heartfelt conversations with the rabbi in order to better know and understand the man that he would one day eulogize. Through this experience, Albom writes, his own sense of faith was reawakened, leading him to make contact with Henry Covington, the African-American pastor of the I Am My Brother's Keeper church in Detroit, where Albom was then living. Covington, a past drug addict, dealer, and ex-convict, ministered to a congregation of largely homeless men and women in a church so poor that the roof leaked when it rained. From his relationships with these two very different men of faith, Albom writes about the difference faith can make in the world.

On November 27, 2011, ABC aired the Hallmark Hall of Fame television movie based on the book.

==== The First Phone Call from Heaven ====
In 2013, Albom moved to a new publisher, HarperCollins, for the publication of his seventh book and fourth novel. In The First Phone Call From Heaven, the small town of Coldwater, Michigan, is thrust into the international spotlight when its citizens suddenly start receiving phone calls from deceased loved ones. Is it the greatest miracle ever or a massive hoax? Sully Harding, a grief-stricken single father recently released from prison, is determined to find the truth. The town is fictional and not the real Coldwater, Michigan, but Albom pays tribute to the real small town in the book's acknowledgements. The First Phone Call from Heaven received starred reviews from Publishers Weekly and Library Journal.

==== The Magic Strings of Frankie Presto ====
Albom's fifth novel, The Magic Strings of Frankie Presto, was published by HarperCollins in 2015. His longest book at almost 400 pages, it chronicles the life and mysterious death of the fictional musician Frankie Presto, as narrated by the voice of Music. An orphan born in a burning church in Spain in 1936, Frankie is blessed with musical ability: at nine years old, Frankie is sent to America in the bottom of a boat, his only possession being an old guitar and six precious strings. The Forrest Gump-like journey that follows takes him through the musical landscape of the 20th century, from classical to jazz to rock and roll super stardom, meeting and working with musical greats (like Hank Williams, Elvis Presley, Carole King, Little Richard, and The Beatles). Real musicians including Tony Bennett, Wynton Marsalis, Paul Stanley, Darlene Love, and Ingrid Michaelson, lent their names to first-person passages to the book, and an original 17-song soundtrack for the book was released by Republic Records four days before the book's release. It featured original songs written and performed by Albom and other artists including Sawyer Fredericks, Mat Kearney, Ingrid Michaelson, John Pizzarelli, and James Brent, interpreting Frankie Presto's "greatest hits", along with such older favorites featured in the novel such as Tony Bennett's "Lost in the Stars" and Dionne Warwick's "A House is Not a Home."

==== The Next Person You Meet in Heaven ====
A sequel to The Five People You Meet in Heaven, Albom's novel The Next Person You Meet in Heaven tells the story of Eddie's heavenly reunion with Annie, the little girl he saved on earth in the first book. The story strongly emphasizes on how lives and losses intersect, and that not only does every life matter, but that every ending is also a new beginning. The book debuted at the top of the New York Times Best Seller list.

==== Finding Chika ====
This book marked Albom's return to nonfiction for the first time in a decade. It is a memoir and a tribute to Chika, a young Haitian orphan who arrived at Albom's Have Faith Haiti Orphanage in Port Au Prince before being diagnosed with an aggressive brain tumor and dying two years later.

An excerpt was read by Albom on the new Lit Hub/Podglomerate Storybound (podcast), accompanied by an original score from musician Maiah Wynne.

==== The Stranger in the Lifeboat ====
Albom's seventh novel, The Stranger in the Lifeboat was published on November 2, 2021, in the US by Harper, an imprint of Harpercollins, and by Sphere, an imprint of Little, Brown Book Group in the UK. The book became a #1 New York Times Best Seller in its first week of sales.

==== The Little Liar ====
The Little Liar was published on November 14, 2023, by HarperCollins. The book peaked at #5 on the New York Times Best Sellers list on December 3, 2023. The book is historical fiction following Nico, an eleven-year-old boy during Germany's occupation of Greece in World War II.

=== As playwright ===
On November 19, 2002, the stage version of Tuesdays with Morrie opened Off Broadway at the Minetta Lane Theatre. Co-authored by Mitch Albom and Jeffrey Hatcher (Three Viewings) and directed by David Esbjornson (The Goat or Who Is Sylvia?). Tuesdays with Morrie starred Alvin Epstein (original Lucky in Waiting for Godot) as Morrie and Jon Tenney (The Heiress) as Mitch.

His follow-up to the stage adaptation of Tuesdays were two original comedies that premiered at the Purple Rose Theatre Company in Chelsea, Michigan, started by actor Jeff Daniels. Duck Hunter Shoots Angel (the Purple Rose's highest grossing play as of 2008) and And the Winner Is have both been produced nationwide, the latter having its West Coast premiere at the Laguna Playhouse in Laguna Beach, California.

The premiere of Albom's Ernie, a play dedicated to the memory of famed Detroit Tigers broadcaster Ernie Harwell, occurred in April 2011 at the City Theatre in Detroit. In subsequent years the play travelled to theaters in Traverse City, East Lansing, and Grand Rapids. It has run for seven summer seasons as of 2017.

In the summer of 2016, Albom debuted his first musical at the City Theatre with Hockey – The Musical! A musical comedy with a book, original songs and parody lyrics written by Albom, Hockey – The Musical! follows five characters who work to convince God to spare hockey after concluding that the world has too many sports and one should be eliminated. An opening night review in The Detroit Free Press describe an "audience roaring for most of the 90 minutes"

=== As musician ===
Albom is an accomplished songwriter, pianist, and lyricist. In 1992, he wrote the song "Cookin' For Two" for a television movie, Christmas in Connecticut, directed by Arnold Schwarzenegger. The song was nominated for The CableACE Award. Albom has been featured on the cover of Making Music Magazine. He also co-wrote the song "Hit Somebody (The Hockey Song)", which was recorded by singer/songwriter Warren Zevon with David Letterman on backup vocals. He performed with the Rock Bottom Remainders, a band of writers that also featured Dave Barry, Stephen King, Ridley Pearson, Amy Tan, Kathi Kamen Goldmark, Sam Barry, and Scott Turow from 1995 until the band dissolved in 2012 with the death of founder Kathi Goldmark. Their performances raised funds for various children's literacy projects across the country.

In July 2013, Albom co-authored Hard Listening (Coliloquy, 2013) with the rest of the Rock Bottom Remainders. The ebook combines essays, fiction, musings, candid email exchanges, and conversations, compromising photographs, audio, and video clips, and interactive quizzes to give readers a view into the private lives of the authors.

=== As a podcaster ===
Based on his memoir Tuesdays With Morrie, Albom started a podcast titled "Tuesday People." According to his website, in each episode of "Tuesday People," Albom "explores the themes he and his old professor spoke about as Morrie was leaving the world, and how they relate to leading a better life." An episode is uploaded to podcast platforms each Tuesday. He often brings guests on to his show and he frequently interacts with his audience, answering their questions and providing advice based on his experiences with Morrie Schwartz.

== Humanitarian work ==
"The Dream Fund", established in 1989, provides a scholarship for disadvantaged children to study the arts. "A Time to Help" which started in 1998, is a Detroit volunteer group. "S.A.Y. (Super All Year) Detroit" is an umbrella program that funds shelters and cares for the homeless. It is now a 501(c)(3) nonprofit organization that funds numerous homeless shelters throughout the Metro Detroit area.

His most recent effort, A Hole in the Roof Foundation, helps faith groups of different denominations who care for the homeless repair the spaces they use. Their first project was the I Am My Brother's Keeper roof in the crumbling but vibrant Detroit church, completed in December 2009. The second project, completed in April 2010, was the rebuilding of the Caring and Sharing Mission and Orphanage. It is now called the Have Faith Haiti Mission & Orphanage, in Port-au-Prince, Haiti.

Albom also directs the Have Faith Haiti Mission, a project whose stated objective is "dedicated to the safety, education, health and spiritual development of Haiti's impoverished children and orphans", incorporating language lessons and Christian prayer.

In March 2024, Albom was one of ten American volunteers rescued by helicopter from Haiti after the group became stranded while visiting an orphanage in the Caribbean nation.

== Other activities ==
During the Detroit newspaper strike of 1995–1997, Albom crossed the picket line and returned to work.

In February 2003, Albom was called to testify at the perjury trial of Chris Webber, member of the "Fab Five" of the University of Michigan's basketball teams in the early 1990s, and subject of a book by Albom. Webber and three other players—the remainder of "Fab Five" were not implicated—were alleged to have received over $290,000 in improper loans from a man considered to be a booster of the University of Michigan, although the amounts were never verified. The loans were allegedly made to players and their families (the school being without alleged involvement or knowledge).

On October 22, 2007, Albom appeared with former New York Governor Mario Cuomo and Tony Bennett in An Evening with Tony Bennett, to honor the release of Bennett's Tony Bennett In The Studio: A Life of Art and Music, for which Albom wrote the foreword.

== Awards and recognition ==
During Albom's years in Detroit, he became one of the most awarded sports writers of his era: He was named best sports columnist in the nation a record 13 times by the Associated Press Sports Editors, and won best feature writing honors from the AP a record seven times.

On June 25, 2010, Albom was awarded the APSE's Red Smith Award for lifetime achievement, presented at the annual APSE convention in Salt Lake City, Utah, although his selection was heavily criticized by a number of Albom's peers, including fellow Red Smith Award winner Dave Kindred.

In 2013, Albom was inducted into the National Sports Media Association (NSMA) "Hall of Fame", (formerly the National Sportscasters and Sportswriters Association). Albom's induction into the Michigan Sports Hall of Fame was announced May 2017.

== Personal life ==
=== Family background ===
Albom was born to Jewish parents Ira Albom (1929–2017), a business executive, and Rhoda Albom (1930–2015), an interior designer. He has siblings including a younger brother Peter and a sister Cara. His mother Rhoda died in January 2015, and his father Ira died in December 2017 after 64 years of marriage.

=== Marriage and children ===
Albom married Janine Sabino in 1995, after meeting her at a Detroit restaurant in 1988. The couple initially intended to meet as a setup with Janine's sister, but Albom was immediately drawn to Janine instead.

Albom and his wife adopted an orphan named Chika Jeune, who came to his attention as a result of his work with his Haitian orphanage. The child was diagnosed with a brain tumor and died after a two-year battle, at age seven, in 2017. His 2019 book, Finding Chika, was about the experiences with her.

In 2022, the couple took in another child from their orphanage, an infant named Nadie, who had been severely malnourished and weighed only seven pounds at six months old. Under their care and medical treatment in Michigan, the child's health significantly improved.

=== Personal interests ===
Beyond writing, Albom is an accomplished musician and pianist. As a child, he taught himself to play piano at age ten, and music has remained central to his life. He performed with the Rock Bottom Remainders, a band of authors that included Dave Barry, Stephen King, Amy Tan, and Scott Turow, from 1995 until the band dissolved in 2012. The band's performances raised funds for children's literacy projects.

=== Philanthropy ===
Albom is deeply involved in philanthropic work, particularly focused on helping Detroit's homeless population and Haitian orphans. In 2006, he founded S.A.Y. Detroit (Super All Year), a charity that provides services for homeless and underserved families, seniors, and veterans in the Detroit metropolitan area. The organization operates multiple homeless shelters, a family health clinic, and various support programs.

He also directs the Have Faith Haiti Mission & Orphanage in Port-au-Prince, Haiti, which he and his wife have operated since 2010. The orphanage has housed more than 70 children over the years. In March 2024, Albom was among ten American volunteers rescued by helicopter from Haiti during a period of political upheaval in the country.

Albom and his wife reside in Detroit, Michigan. They have purchased the house next to their home to provide accommodations for children from the Haiti orphanage who come to the United States for education or medical care.

== Selected books ==
- Live Albom: The Best of Detroit Free Press Sports Columnist Mitch Albom (1988) ISBN 9780937247068
- Live Albom II (1990) ISBN 9780937247198
- Live Albom III: Gone to the Dogs (1992) ISBN 9780937247501
- Fab Five: Basketball, Trash Talk, the American Dream (1993) ISBN 9780446601191
- Live Albom IV (1995), foreword by Dave Barry ISBN 9780937247662
- Tuesdays with Morrie (August 1997) ISBN 0-7679-0592-X
- The Five People You Meet in Heaven (September 2003) ISBN 0-7868-6871-6
- For One More Day (September 2006) ISBN 1-4013-0327-7
- Have a Little Faith: A True Story (September 2009) ISBN 0-7868-6872-4
- The Time Keeper (September 2012) ISBN 1401322786
- The First Phone Call from Heaven (November 2013) ISBN 9780062294371
- The Magic Strings of Frankie Presto (November 2015) ISBN 9780062294432
- The Next Person You Meet in Heaven (October 2018) ISBN 0-0622-9444-X
- Finding Chika: A Little Girl, an Earthquake, and the Making of a Family (November 2019) ISBN 978-0062952394
- Human Touch: A Story in Real Time (April 2020) (available for free on Albom's website, with donations going toward SAY Detroit's "Detroit Beats COVID-19")
- The Stranger in the Lifeboat (November 2021) ISBN 9780062888341
- The Little Liar (November 2023) ISBN 9780062406651
- Twice (October 2025) ISBN 9780062406682
