= List of Hallmark Hall of Fame episodes =

The following is a list of episodes of the American television anthology series, Hallmark Hall of Fame.

- (v) indicates the production is available on videocassette.
- (DVD) indicates the movie is available on DVD

== Seasons ==
=== Season 1 (1951–52) ===
Hallmark no.	No. in season	Title	Directed by	Original release date
1	1	Amahl and the Night Visitors	Kirk Browning	December 24, 1951
Restaged live several times.
N/A	2	Doctor Serocold	William Corrigan	January 6, 1952
First appearance by child actress Lydia Reed
N/A	3	Love Story	William Corrigan	January 13, 1952
N/A	4	The Big Build Up	William Corrigan	January 20, 1952
Starring: Grace Kelly
N/A	5	The Story of Roger Williams	William Corrigan	January 27, 1952
N/A	6	Florence Nightingale	William Corrigan	February 3, 1952
N/A	7	Woman with a Sword	William Corrigan	February 10, 1952
Starring: Jayne Meadows
N/A	8	The Plot to Kidnap General Washington	William Corrigan	February 17, 1952
N/A	9	Mistress of the White House	William Corrigan	February 24, 1952
Starring: June Lockhart
N/A	10	Prelude	William Corrigan	March 2, 1952
Starring: Sarah Churchill as George Sand, and Alan Shayne as Frédéric Chopin
N/A	11	Juliette Low and the Girl Scouts	William Corrigan	March 9, 1952
N/A	12	Constitution Island	William Corrigan	March 16, 1952
N/A	13	Harriet Quimby	William Corrigan	March 23, 1952
Starring: Sarah Churchill
N/A	14	The Vision of Father Flanagan	William Corrigan	March 30, 1952
N/A	15	Ordeal by White House	William Corrigan	April 6, 1952
Based on the life of Grover Cleveland
2	16	Amahl and the Night Visitors new production	Kirk Browning	April 13, 1952
Live rebroadcast
N/A	17	Anne Bradstreet, Puritan Poetess	William Corrigan	April 20, 1952
Starring: Sarah Churchill
N/A	18	Miracle in May	William Corrigan	April 27, 1952
From the life of Edward Jenner
N/A	19	The Face of Spain	William Corrigan	May 4, 1952
From the life of Francisco Goya
N/A	20	A Woman for the Ages	William Corrigan	May 11, 1952
Starring: Sylvia Field as Abigail Adams
N/A	21	Reign of Terror	William Corrigan	May 18, 1952
James Monroe as minister to France during the French Revolution
N/A	22	The Magnificent Failure	William Corrigan	May 25, 1952
About Louisa May Alcott
N/A	23	The King's Author	Unknown	June 1, 1952
About Ben Jonson
N/A	24	Nefretiti, Queen of Egypt	William Corrigan	June 8, 1952
Starring: Sarah Churchill
N/A	25	Mr. and Mrs. Freedom	William Corrigan	June 15, 1952
N/A	26	Forgotten Children	William Corrigan	June 22, 1952
Starring: James Dean and Cloris Leachman
N/A	27	Our Sister Emily	William Corrigan	June 29, 1952
Starring: Sarah Churchill as Charlotte Brontë
N/A	28	The Legend of Josiah Blow	Unknown	July 6, 1952
N/A	29	The Real Glory	Unknown	July 13, 1952
N/A	30	Salvage	Unknown	July 20, 1952
N/A	31	21-Plus	With Martin Huston	July 27, 1952
N/A	32	The Carlson Legend	Albert McCleery	August 3, 1952
N/A	33	The Last Command	Unknown	August 10, 1952
N/A	34	I Lift Up My Lamp	Albert McCleery	August 17, 1952

=== Season 3 (1953–54) ===
No. overall	No. in series	Title	Directed by	Written by	Original release date
N/A	1	Crabapple Saint	Albert McCleery	Hector Chevigny	August 24, 1952
N/A	2	Refresher Course	Albert McCleery	Joseph Cochran; James Truex	August 31, 1952
N/A	3	Dutch Treat	Albert McCleery	H. Philip Minis; Robert L. Smock	September 7, 1952
N/A	4	Horns of a Dilemma	Albert McCleery	Harold Callen	September 14, 1952
N/A	5	The Bride's Teapot	Albert McCleery	Robert Mason Pollock	September 21, 1952
N/A	6	Sometimes She's Sunday	Albert McCleery	Fred Lane	September 28, 1952
N/A	7	The Bachelor and the Ballot	Albert McCleery	Robert Mason Pollock	October 12, 1952
N/A	8	Faith Is a Nine-Letter Word	Albert McCleery	Walter Black; William Mendrek	October 19, 1952
N/A	9	The Secret Vote	Albert McCleery	Harold Callen	October 26, 1952
N/A	10	The Line of Duty	Albert McCleery	Unknown	November 2, 1952
N/A	11	Bread of Freedom	Albert McCleery	James Truex	November 9, 1952
N/A	12	The Blue and White Lamp	Albert McCleery; Frances Allen; Lewis Lusardi	Harold Callen	November 16, 1952
N/A	13	Mrs. Thanksgiving	Albert McCleery	Robert Mason Pollock	November 23, 1952
N/A	14	Ten Thousand Words	Albert McCleery	Robert Mason Pollock	November 30, 1952
N/A	15	Joan of Arc	Albert McCleery	Harold Callen	December 7, 1952
Starring: Sarah Churchill as Joan of Arc
N/A	16	The Hills Are Green	Albert McCleery	Albert McCleery	December 14, 1952
N/A	17	The Small One	Albert McCleery	Charles Tazewell	December 21, 1952
Starring: Kate Smith
N/A	18	Father Time	Albert McCleery	Robert Mason Pollock	December 28, 1952
3	N/A	Amahl and the Night Visitors	Kirk Browning; Gian Carlo Menotti	Gian Carlo Menotti	December 24, 1951
Christmas season. The third new broadcast
N/A	19	Home Is the Sailor	Albert McCleery	Albert McCleery	January 4, 1953
N/A	20	Span Through Time	Albert McCleery; George Wyland	James Truex	January 11, 1953
N/A	21	The General's Bible	Albert McCleery; Ted Wear	Harold Callen	January 18, 1953
N/A	22	Socrates' Wife	Albert McCleery	Harold Callen	January 25, 1953
Starring: Katina Paxinou as Xanthippe
N/A	23	To My Valentine	Albert McCleery	Harold Callen	February 1, 1953
N/A	24	Lincoln's Little Correspondent	Albert McCleery	Teleplay by : Ellen McCracken & Richard McCracken; Story by : Hertha Pauli	February 8, 1953
N/A	25	Crown of Audubon	Albert McCleery	Robert Mason Pollock	February 15, 1953
N/A	26	Dinner for the General	Albert McCleery	Reginald Lawrence	February 22, 1953
N/A	27	The Accused	Albert McCleery	William L. Stuart	March 1, 1953
Starring: Sarah Churchill
N/A	28	Horace Mann's Miracle	Albert McCleery	Rod Serling	March 8, 1953
N/A	29	The Harp of Erin	Albert McCleery	Ellen McCracken; Richard McCracken	March 15, 1953
Starring: Dennis Patrick as Thomas Moore
N/A	30	Photograph by Brady	Albert McCleery; Ted Wear	Robert Mason Pollock	March 22, 1953
Starring: Philip Bourneuf as Mathew Brady
N/A	31	A Queen Is Born	Albert McCleery	Unknown	March 29, 1953
N/A	32	The Other Wise Man	Albert McCleery	Teleplay by : Harold Callen; Story by : Henry Van Dyke	April 5, 1953
N/A	33	Skipper of the Skies	Albert McCleery	Robert Mason Pollock	April 12, 1953
Starring: Leslie Nielsen as Nathaniel Bowditch
N/A	34	The World on a Wire	Albert McCleery	Ellen McCracken; Richard McCracken	April 19, 1953
Starring: Russell Hardie as Samuel Morse
4	35	Hamlet	Albert McCleery	Teleplay by : Tom Hughes Sand & Mildred Freed Alberg; Story by : William Shakespeare	April 26, 1953
Starring: Maurice Evans as Hamlet
N/A	36	No Man Is an Island	Albert McCleery	Helene Hanff	May 3, 1953
Starring: Scott Forbes as John Donne
N/A	37	The Lady of Liberty	Albert McCleery; Ted Wear	Harold Callen	May 10, 1953
N/A	38	Soldier of Peace	Albert McCleery	Robert Mason Pollock	May 17, 1953
Starring: Stephen Courtleigh as General Robert E. Lee
N/A	39	Proudly I Love	Norman Felton	John Burnham Schwartz	May 24, 1953
Starring: Sarah Churchill as Sarah Bernhardt
N/A	40	Spark of Genius	Albert McCleery	Elaine Ryan	May 31, 1953
N/A	41	The Clay of Kings	Albert McCleery	Elaine Ryan	June 7, 1953
Starring: Roger Moore as Josiah Wedgwood
N/A	42	Scott's Castle	Albert McCleery	Unknown	June 14, 1953
N/A	43	Man Against Pain	Albert McCleery	Rod Serling	June 21, 1953
Starring: Tod Andrews as William Thomas Green Morton
N/A	44	The Mercer Girls	Albert McCleery	Poot Pray	June 28, 1953

Hallmark no.	No. in season	Title	Directed by	Original release date
N/A	1	A Smile for Danger	Unknown	September 27, 1953
N/A	2	Of Time and the River	Unknown	October 4, 1953
Starring: Sara Haden and Thomas Mitchell
N/A	3	A Queen's Way	Unknown	October 11, 1953
Starring: Sarah Churchill as Catherine Parr
N/A	4	McCoy of Abilene	Unknown	October 18, 1953
Starring: George Nader as Joseph McCoy
N/A	5	Never Kick a Man Upstairs	Albert McCleery	October 25, 1953
Starring: Sidney Blackmer as Theodore Roosevelt
N/A	6	The Imaginary Invalid	Albert McCleery	November 1, 1953
Starring: Barry Jones
N/A	7	The Lonely Path	Albert McCleery	November 8, 1953
Starring: Gene Barry as John Fremont
N/A	8	Of Time and the River	Unknown	November 15, 1953
A second presentation with the same stars; tv.com shows the title as The Death of Gant
N/A	9	The Courtship of Miles Standish	Albert McCleery	November 22, 1953
Starring: Kenneth Tobey as Miles Standish
N/A	10	The Last Voyage	Albert McCleery	November 29, 1953
Starring: Maurice Manson as Benjamin Franklin and Richard Garland as Thomas Jefferson
N/A	11	TBA	Unknown	December 6, 1953
N/A	12	Aesop and Rhodope	Unknown	December 13, 1953
Starring: Lamont Johnson as Aesop, and Sarah Churchill as Rhodope
5	13	Amahl and the Night Visitors	Unknown	December 20, 1953
The 4th new production. Starring Bill McIver as Amahl.
N/A	14	Blaze of Darkness	Albert McCleery	December 27, 1953
Starring: John Sutton as John Milton
N/A	15	John Marshall and the Burr Case	Albert McCleery	January 3, 1954
Starring: Richard Garland
N/A	16	Crusade to Liberty	Albert McCleery	January 10, 1954
Starring: Douglass Montgomery as James Edward Oglethorpe
N/A	17	The St. Cloud Storm	Albert McCleery	January 17, 1954
Starring: Dorothy Green as Jane Grey Swisshelm
6	18	King Richard II	George Schaefer	January 24, 1954
Starring: Maurice Evans as Richard II
N/A	19	Lone Star	Albert McCleery	January 31, 1954
Starring: Stephen Coit
N/A	20	The Hands of Clara Schumann	Unknown	February 7, 1954
Starring: Sarah Churchill as Clara Weick Schumann, and Patrick O'Neal as Robert Schumann
N/A	21	Crusader Against Cruelty	Albert McCleery	February 14, 1954
N/A	22	Miss Tracy of Mount Vernon	Albert McCleery	February 21, 1954
Starring: Sarah Churchill as Sarah Tracy
N/A	23	The Turbulent Air	Unknown	February 28, 1954
Starring: John Hudson as Antoine Lavoisier
N/A	24	The Good Samaritan	Unknown	March 7, 1954
Starring: Douglass Montgomery
N/A	25	The Road to Tara	Unknown	March 14, 1954
Starring: Patrick O'Neal as St. Patrick
N/A	26	Out of Jules Verne	Albert McCleery	March 21, 1954
Starring: George Nader as Jules Verne
N/A	27	The Ordeal of Thomas Jefferson	Unknown	March 28, 1954
Starring: Warner Anderson as Thomas Jefferson
N/A	28	Young William Penn	Unknown	April 4, 1954
N/A	29	The Liberator	Unknown	April 11, 1954
Starring: Joseph Jefferson as Simón Bolívar
N/A	30	The Story of Ruth	Unknown	April 18, 1954
Starring: Maria Riva as Ruth
N/A	31	Lafayette for Freedom	Albert McCleery	April 25, 1954
N/A	32	Petticoat Revolution (Hallmark Hall of Fame)	Albert McCleery	May 2, 1954
Starring: Jess Barker and Helen Westcott
N/A	33	Portrait by Whistler	Albert McCleery	May 9, 1954
Starring: Keith Larsen as James Abbott McNeill Whistler
N/A	34	Moby Dick	Albert McCleery	May 16, 1954
Starring: Victor Jory as Captain Ahab and Lamont Johnson as Ishmael
N/A	35	The Story of Father Juniper Serra	Albert McCleery	May 23, 1954
Starring: Robert Warwick as Junípero Serra, alternative title: Serra and San Francisco
N/A	36	The Armour-Bearer	Albert McCleery	May 30, 1954
The story of Russell Conwell
N/A	37	A Reckless Youth	Albert McCleery	June 6, 1954
A story surrounding Samuel Clemens's marriage.
N/A	38	Come to the Window	Unknown	June 13, 1954
Starring: Jan Clayton as Jenny Lind
N/A	39	Flight from Cathay	Albert McCleery	June 20, 1954
Starring: Sarah Churchill as Princess Kukschin, Dennis Patrick as Marco Polo
N/A	40	Wife Unto Caesar	Albert McCleery	June 27, 1954
Starring: Sarah Churchill as Calpurnia, Hans Conried as Caesar
N/A	41	John Paul Jones	Albert McCleery	July 7, 1954
Starring: Gloria Jean and Lamont Johnson

=== Season 4 (1954–55) ===
Hallmark no.	No. in season	Title	Directed by	Original release date
N/A	1	Dynamite, the Story of Alfred Nobel	Albert McCleery	September 5, 1954
Starring: Wesley Addy as Alfred Nobel
N/A	2	Don't Cry for Me	Albert McCleery	September 12, 1954
Starring: John Sheppod as Stephen Foster
N/A	3	A Man of Many Ideas	Albert McCleery	September 19, 1954
Starring: Peter Graves as John Wanamaker
N/A	4	The Reluctant Redeemer	Albert McCleery	September 26, 1954
Starring: John Barrymore Jr. as Moses and Natalie Wood as Sephora
N/A	5	The Story of Johann Sebastian Bach	Albert McCleery	October 3, 1954
N/A	6	Immortal Oath	Unknown	October 10, 1954
Starring: John Baer as Hippocrates and Vera Miles
N/A	7	The Story of John Paulding	Unknown	October 17, 1954
N/A	8	Lady in the Wings	Albert McCleery	October 24, 1954
Starring: Peter Hansen as Edward MacDowell and Rosemary DeCamp as Mrs. Macdowell
N/A	9	The Path to Peace	Albert McCleery	October 31, 1954
Starring: Herbert Rudley as Horace Greeley
N/A	10	The Story of Daniel Boone	Unknown	November 7, 1954
N/A	11	A Matter of Principle	Unknown	November 14, 1954
An incident from the life of John Adams
N/A	12	President for a Day	Albert McCleery	November 21, 1954
The story of David Rice Atchison
7	13	Macbeth	George Schaefer	November 28, 1954
Starring: Maurice Evans and Judith Anderson
N/A	14	Deadlock	Albert McCleery	December 5, 1954
Starring: Wesley Addy as Alexander Hamilton, and Ian Keith as Thomas Jefferson
N/A	15	The Province of Man	Unknown	December 12, 1954
Starring: John Sutton as William Harvey
8	16	Amahl and the Night Visitors	Unknown	December 19, 1954
Starring: Bill McIver as Amahl. A fifth new version, the first in color.
N/A	17	The Joyful Tydings	Albert McCleery	December 26, 1954
Starring: Terence De Marney as William Tyndale
N/A	18	The Story of William Tell	Unknown	January 2, 1955
Starring: James Arness as William Tell
N/A	19	The First Mintmaster	Albert McCleery	January 9, 1955
Starring: Mark Dana as Edward Hull, and Lamont Johnson as John Hull
N/A	20	Crusade for Freedom	Albert McCleery	January 16, 1955
Starring: Ben Cooper as Benjamin Franklin, and Dick Simmons as Cotton Mather
N/A	21	Dr. Harvey W. Wiley	Albert McCleery	January 23, 1955
Starring: Paul Langton as Harvey W. Wiley
N/A	22	A Story About Henry Ford	Albert McCleery	January 30, 1955
Starring: Arthur Franz as Henry Ford, and Will J. White as Barney Oldfield
N/A	23	Patrick Henry	Albert McCleery	February 6, 1955
Starring: Jack Kelly as Patrick Henry
N/A	24	The Shining Beacon	Albert McCleery	February 13, 1955
Starring: Whitfield Connor as Alcuin, and Don Megowan as Charlemagne
N/A	25	The Courtship of George Washington and Martha Custiss	Albert McCleery	February 20, 1955
Starring: Marshall Thompson as George Washington, and Karen Sharpe as Martha Custiss
N/A	26	The Talking Wire	Albert McCleery	February 27, 1955
Starring: Peter Hansen as Alexander Graham Bell
N/A	27	The Adventures of Lt. Contee	Albert McCleery	March 6, 1955
Starring: John Drew Barrymore as Lt. Marcus Contee
N/A	28	The Pirate and the Lawyer	Albert McCleery	March 13, 1955
Starring: Ray Danton as Jean Lafitte
N/A	29	Soldier's Bride	Albert McCleery	March 20, 1955
Starring: John Baragrey as Jefferson Davis, Sarah Churchill as Knox Taylor, and Richard Gaines as Zachary Taylor
N/A	30	The Finest Gift	Albert McCleery	March 27, 1955
Starring: Tod Andrews as Lord Byron
N/A	31	The Green Mountain Boys	Albert McCleery	April 3, 1955
Starring: William Bishop as Ethan Allen
N/A	32	Lydia	Albert McCleery	April 10, 1955
Starring: Sarah Churchill as Lydia, and Lamont Johnson as Paul
N/A	33	The Man Who Tore Down the Wall	Albert McCleery	April 17, 1955
Starring: Peter Graves as Dr. James Ewing
N/A	34	Aimée de Rivery	Albert McCleery	April 24, 1955
Starring: Sarah Churchill as Aimée De Rivery
N/A	35	The Touch of Steel	Albert McCleery	May 1, 1955
Starring: Jan Merlin as Oliver Wendell Holmes Jr.
N/A	36	Cradle Song	Albert McCleery	May 8, 1955
Starring: Osa Massen as Ernestine Schumann-Heink
N/A	37	The Promise	Albert McCleery	May 15, 1955
Starring: Lamont Johnson as Damon, and Marshall Thompson as Pythias
N/A	38	The Man with a Camera	Albert McCleery	May 22, 1955
Starring: Gene Reynolds as George Eastman
N/A	39	The Story of Paul Harris and the Founding of Rotary International	Albert McCleery	May 29, 1955
Starring: Edward Arnold as Paul P. Harris
N/A	40	The Hammer and the Sword	Albert McCleery	June 5, 1955
Starring: Joseph Schildkraut as Baron Friedrich Wilhelm von Steuben. Alternative title: The Tempering of the Sword
N/A	41	Edgar Allan Poe at West Point	Albert McCleery	June 12, 1955
Starring: John Carlyle as Edgar Allan Poe
N/A	42	The Father Who Had No Sons	Albert McCleery	June 19, 1955
Starring: Gene Lockhart as Milton Hershey
N/A	43	The Farmer from Monticello	Albert McCleery	June 26, 1955
Starring: Rhodes Reason as Thomas Jefferson

=== Season 5 (1955–56) ===
Hallmark no.	No. in season	Title	Directed by	Original release date
9	9	Alice In Wonderland	George Schaefer	October 23, 1955
10	2	The Devil's Disciple	George Schaefer	November 20, 1955
Starring: Maurice Evans as Richard Dudgeon
11	3	Dream Girl	George Schaefer	December 11, 1955
Starring: Vivian Blaine as Georgina Allerton
12	4	The Corn Is Green	George Schaefer	January 8, 1956
Starring: Eva Le Gallienne as Miss Moffat
13	5	The Good Fairy	George Schaefer	February 5, 1956
Starring: Julie Harris
14	6	The Taming of the Shrew	George Schaefer	March 18, 1956
Starring: Maurice Evans as Petruchio. Lilli Palmer as Katherine
15	N/A	Cradle Song	George Schaefer	May 6, 1956
Starring: Judith Anderson, Evelyn Varden

=== Season 6 (1956–57) ===
Hallmark no.	No. in season	Title	Directed by	Original release date
16	1	Born Yesterday	Garson Kanin	October 28, 1956
Starring: Mary Martin and Paul Douglas
17	2	Man and Superman	George Schaefer	November 25, 1956
Starring: Maurice Evans as Jack Tanner
18	3	The Little Foxes	George Schaefer	December 16, 1956
Starring: Greer Garson as Regina Giddens
19	4	The Lark	George Schaefer	February 10, 1957
Starring: Julie Harris as Joan of Arc, with Boris Karloff, Basil Rathbone and Jack Warden
20	5	There Shall Be No Night	George Schaefer	March 17, 1957
Starring: Charles Boyer and Katharine Cornell
21	6	The Yeomen of the Guard	George Schaefer	April 10, 1957
Adapted from the Gilbert and Sullivan operetta.

=== Season 7 (1957–58) ===
Hallmark no.	No. in season	Title	Directed by	Original release date
22	1	The Green Pastures	George Schaefer	October 17, 1957
23	2	On Borrowed Time	George Schaefer	November 17, 1957
Starring: Ed Wynn and Claude Rains
24	3	Twelfth Night	David Greene	December 15, 1957
Starring: Maurice Evans as Malvolio
25	4	Hans Brinker and the Silver Skates	George Schaefer and Sidney Lumet	February 9, 1958
Starring: Tab Hunter and Dick Button
26	5	Little Moon of Alban	George Schaefer	March 24, 1958
Starring: Julie Harris and Christopher Plummer
27	6	Dial M for Murder	George Schaefer	April 25, 1958
Starring: Maurice Evans and Rosemary Harris

=== Season 8 (1958–59) ===
Hallmark no.	No. in season	Title	Directed by	Original release date
28	1	Johnny Belinda	George Schaefer	October 13, 1958
Starring: Julie Harris and Christopher Plummer
29	2	Kiss Me, Kate (DVD)	George Schaefer	November 20, 1958
Starring: Alfred Drake and Patricia Morison, from the original Broadway cast. Their only video appearance in these roles.
30	3	The Christmas Tree	Kirk Browning	December 14, 1958
A number of stars in short skits, including Carol Channing and Cyril Ritchard on skates.
31	4	Berkeley Square	George Schaefer	February 5, 1959
Starring: John Kerr
32	N/A	The Green Pastures	Unknown	March 23, 1959
A restaging of No. 22 with most of the same cast
33	5	Ah, Wilderness!	Robert Mulligan	April 28, 1959
Starring: Lloyd Nolan

=== Season 9 (1959–60) ===
Hallmark no.	No. in season	Title	Directed by	Original release date
34	1	Winterset	George Schaefer	October 26, 1959
Starring: Don Murray, Piper Laurie and George C. Scott
35	2	A Doll's House	George Schaefer	November 15, 1959
Starring: Julie Harris, Christopher Plummer and Jason Robards
36	3	A Christmas Festival	Albert McCleery	December 13, 1959
Starring: Judith Anderson, Dick Button and the Obernkirchen Children's Choir. This production was soundly beaten in the ratings by CBS's second telecast of The Wizard of Oz, which aired on the same night. It was the spectacular success of this telecast of the film which persuaded CBS to make it an annual television attraction.
37	4	The Tempest	George Schaefer	February 3, 1960
Starring: Richard Burton, Maurice Evans and Lee Remick
38	6	The Cradle Song	George Schaefer	April 10, 1960
A new presentation of the play with some of the same actors as the 1956 production; starring Judith Anderson, Helen Hayes.
39	5	Captain Brassbound's Conversion	George Schaefer	May 2, 1960
Starring: Christopher Plummer as Captain Brassbound, with Robert Redford and Greer Garson

=== Season 10 (1960–61) ===
Hallmark no.	No. in season	Title	Directed by	Original release date
40	1	Shangri-La	George Schaefer	October 24, 1960
Starring: Richard Basehart and Claude Rains
41	2	Macbeth	George Schaefer	November 20, 1960
A new presentation (see season 4 episode 13 for earlier version), again starring Maurice Evans, Judith Anderson.
42	3	Golden Child	George Schaefer	December 16, 1960
Starring: Patricia Brooks, Enrico Di Giuseppe and Stephen Douglass
43	4	Time Remembered	George Schaefer	February 7, 1961
Starring: Janet Munro, Edith Evans and Christopher Plummer
44	5	Give Us Barabbas!	George Schaefer	March 26, 1961
Starring: James Daly and Kim Hunter
45	6	The Joke and the Valley	George Schaefer	May 5, 1961
Starring: Thomas Mitchell

=== Season 11 (1961–62) ===
Hallmark no.	No. in season	Title	Directed by	Original release date
46	1	Macbeth	Unknown	October 20, 1961
Rerun of #41
47	2	Victoria Regina	George Schaefer	November 30, 1961
Adapted from Laurence Housman's 1934 play Victoria Regina. Starring Julie Harris as Queen Victoria, James Donald as Prince Albert and Basil Rathbone as Benjamin Disraeli.
48	3	Arsenic & Old Lace	George Schaefer	February 5, 1962
Starring: Tony Randall, Boris Karloff and Tom Bosley
49	N/A	Give Us Barabbas!	Unknown	April 15, 1962
Rerun of #44

=== Season 12 (1962–63) ===
Hallmark no.	No. in season	Title	Directed by	Original release date
50	1	The Teahouse of the August Moon	George Schaefer	October 26, 1962
Starring: Paul Ford, John Forsythe and Miyoshi Umeki
51	2	Cyrano de Bergerac	George Schaefer	December 6, 1962
Starring: Christopher Plummer, Hope Lange and Donald Harron
52	3	Pygmalion	George Schaefer	February 6, 1963
Starring: Julie Harris and James Donald
53	4	The Invincible Mr. Disraeli	George Schaefer	April 4, 1963
Starring: Trevor Howard and Greer Garson

=== Season 13 (1963–64) ===
Hallmark no.	No. in season	Title	Directed by	Original release date
54	1	The Tempest	George Schaefer	October 20, 1963
Rerun of #37
55	2	The Patriots	George Schaefer	November 15, 1963
Starring: Charlton Heston as Thomas Jefferson, John Fraser as Alexander Hamilton, and Howard St. John as George Washington
56	3	A Cry of Angels	George Schaefer	December 15, 1963
Starring: Walter Slezak as George Frederic Handel, with Maureen O'Hara and Hermione Gingold
57	4	Abe Lincoln in Illinois	George Schaefer	February 2, 1964
Starring: Jason Robards Jr. as Abe Lincoln, and Kate Reid as Mary Todd
58	5	Little Moon of Alban	George Schaefer	March 18, 1964
Starring: Julie Harris and Dirk Bogarde a new presentation

=== Season 14 (1964–65) ===
Hallmark no.	No. in season	Title	Directed by	Original release date
59	1	The Fantasticks	George Schaefer	October 18, 1964
Starring: Ricardo Montalbán, Bert Lahr and Stanley Holloway. The first television presentation of the stage musical.
60	2	The Other World of Winston Churchill	Louis Clyde Stoumen	November 30, 1964
Starring: Paul Scofield and Merle Oberon, with Patrick Wymark as Winston Churchill
61	N/A	Amahl and the Night Visitors	Kirk Browning	December 20, 1964
Starring: Kurt Yaghjian as Amahl. The controversial version rejected by Menotti. Followed by a 10-minute special hosted by Roddy McDowall, displaying Christmas trees decorated by celebrities Julie Harris, Norman Vincent Peale, Dick Van Dyke, Paul Newman and Joanne Woodward, Helena Rubenstein, Cecil Beaton and Maurice Evans.
62	3	The Magnificent Yankee	George Schaefer	January 28, 1965
Starring: Alfred Lunt as Oliver Wendell Holmes
63	4	The Holy Terror	George Schaefer	April 7, 1965
Starring: Julie Harris as Florence Nightingale

=== Season 15 (1965–66) ===
Hallmark no.	No. in season	Title	Directed by	Original release date
64	1	Eagle In a Cage	George Schaefer	October 20, 1965
Starring: Trevor Howard as Napoleon, and James Daly as Dr. O'Meara
65	2	Inherit the Wind	George Schaefer	November 18, 1965
Starring: Melvyn Douglas as Henry Drummond, and Ed Begley as Matthew Harrison Brady
66	N/A	Amahl and the Night Visitors	Kirk Browning	December 12, 1965
Rerun of number 61, seemingly without the added segment about Christmas trees.
67	N/A	The Magnificent Yankee	Unknown	February 3, 1966
Rerun of number 62.
68	3	Lamp at Midnight (v)	George Schaefer	April 27, 1966
Starring: Melvyn Douglas as Galileo Galilei

=== Season 16 (1966–67) ===
Hallmark no.	No. in season	Title	Directed by	Original release date
69	1	Barefoot In Athens	George Schaefer	November 11, 1966
Starring: Peter Ustinov as Socrates, and Geraldine Page as Xantippe
70	2	Blithe Spirit	George Schaefer	December 7, 1966
Starring: Dirk Bogarde and Rosemary Harris
71	N/A	Abe Lincoln in Illinois	Unknown	February 2, 1967
Rerun of #57
72	3	Anastasia	George Schaefer	March 17, 1967
Starring: Julie Harris as Anastasia, and Lynn Fontanne as Grand Duchess Marie
73	4	Soldier in Love	George Schaefer	April 26, 1967
Starring: Claire Bloom as Anne, with Jean Simmons and Basil Rathbone

=== Season 17 (1967–68) ===
Hallmark no.	No. in season	Title	Directed by	Original release date
74	1	A Bell for Adano	Mel Ferrer	November 11, 1967
Starring: John Forsythe
75	2	Saint Joan	George Schaefer	December 4, 1967
Starring: Geneviève Bujold as Joan of Arc
76	3	Elizabeth the Queen (V)	George Schaefer	January 24, 1968
Starring: Judith Anderson as Elizabeth I, and Charlton Heston as Robert Devereux, 2nd Earl of Essex
77	N/A	Give Us Barabbas	Unknown	March 29, 1968
Rerun of #44
78	4	The Admirable Crichton	George Schaefer	May 2, 1968
Starring: Bill Travers

=== Season 18 (1968–69) ===
Hallmark no.	No. in season	Title	Directed by	Original release date
79	1	A Punt, A Pass & A Prayer	Tom Donovan	November 20, 1968
Starring: Herbert Anderson and Don DeFore
80	2	Pinocchio	Sid Smith	December 8, 1968
Starring: Burl Ives and Peter Noone
81	3	Teacher, Teacher	Fielder Cook	February 5, 1969
Starring: David McCallum and Ossie Davis
82	4	Give Us Barabbas	Unknown	March 28, 1969
Rerun of #77
83	5	Victoria Regina	Unknown	May 2, 1969
Rerun of #47

=== Season 19 (1969–70) ===
Hallmark no.	No. in season	Title	Directed by	Original release date
84	1	The File on Devlin	George Schaefer	November 21, 1969
Starring: Judith Anderson and Elizabeth Ashley
85	2	The Littlest Angel (v, DVD)	Walter C. Miller	December 6, 1969
Starring: E.G. Marshall as God and Johnny Whitaker, with Fred Gwynne, Tony Randall, Cab Calloway, and Connie Stevens.
86	3	A Storm In Summer	Buzz Kulik	February 6, 1970
Starring: Peter Ustinov and N'Gai Dixon
87	4	Neither Are We Enemies	David Pressman	March 13, 1970
Starring: Van Heflin as Joseph of Arimathea, with Ed Begley and Kate Reid
88	N/A	Teacher, Teacher	Unknown	May 1, 1970
Rerun of #81

=== Season 20 (1970–71) ===
Hallmark no.	No. in season	Title	Directed by	Original release date
89	1	Hamlet	Peter Wood	November 17, 1970
Starring: Richard Chamberlain as Hamlet, and Michael Redgrave as Polonius
90	N/A	The Littlest Angel	Unknown	December 6, 1970
Rerun of #85
91	2	The Price	Fielder Cook	February 3, 1971
Starring: George C. Scott and Barry Sullivan
92	3	Gideon	George Schaefer	March 26, 1971
Starring: Peter Ustinov and José Ferrer
93	N/A	A Storm in Summer	Unknown	April 27, 1971
Rerun of #86

=== Season 21 (1971–72) ===
Hallmark no.	No. in season	Title	Directed by	Original release date
94	1	The Snow Goose (DVD)	Patrick Garland	November 15, 1971
Starring: Richard Harris and Jenny Agutter
95	2	All the Way Home	Fred Coe	December 1, 1971
Starring: Joanne Woodward and Richard Kiley
96	3	The Littlest Angel	Unknown	December 12, 1971
Another rerun of #85
97	4	Love! Love! Love!	Sterling Johnson	February 8, 1972
Starring: Helen Reddy, Bread and Mac Davis; narrated by Robert Wagner; musical documentary special focused on the life and romance of six couples in various parts of the United States, filmed on location.
98	5	Harvey	Fielder Cook	March 22, 1972
Starring: James Stewart, Helen Hayes and Arlene Francis
99	N/A	The Price	Unknown	May 3, 1972
Rerun of #91

=== Season 22 (1972–73) ===
Hallmark no.	No. in season	Title	Directed by	Original release date
100	1	The Hands of Cormac Joyce	Fielder Cook	November 17, 1972
Starring: Stephen Boyd, Colleen Dewhurst and Cyril Cusack
101	2	The Man Who Came To Dinner	Buzz Kulik	November 29, 1972
Starring: Orson Welles and Lee Remick
102	N/A	The Snow Goose	Unknown	December 12, 1972
Rerun of #94
103	3	You're a Good Man, Charlie Brown	Walter C. Miller	February 9, 1973
Starring: Wendell Burton as Charlie Brown

=== Season 23 (1973–74) ===
Hallmark no.	No. in season	Title	Directed by	Original release date
105	1	Lisa, Bright and Dark	Jeannot Szwarc	November 28, 1973
Starring: Anne Baxter and John Forsythe
106	2	The Borrowers	Walter C. Miller	December 14, 1973
Starring: Eddie Albert and Tammy Grimes
107	3	The Country Girl	Paul Bogart	February 5, 1974
Starring: Jason Robards and Shirley Knight
108	4	Crown Matrimonial	Alan Bridges	April 3, 1974
Starring: Peter Barkworth as King Edward VIII
104	5	The Small Miracle	Jeannot Szwarc	April 11, 1974
Starring: Vittorio de Sica

=== Season 24 (1974–75) ===
Hallmark no.	No. in season	Title	Directed by	Original release date
109	1	Brief Encounter	Alan Bridges	November 12, 1974
Starring: Sophia Loren and Richard Burton
110	2	The Gathering Storm	Herbert Wise	November 29, 1974
Starring: Richard Burton as Winston Churchill, and Virginia McKenna as Clementine Churchill
111	N/A	The Borrowers	Unknown	December 13, 1974
Rerun of #106
112	3	All Creatures Great and Small	Claude Whatham	February 4, 1975
Starring: Simon Ward and Anthony Hopkins
113	4	Something Wonderful Happens Every Spring	Unknown	March 19, 1975
An abridgement of #104, The Small Miracle

=== Season 25 (1975–76) ===
Hallmark no.	No. in season	Title	Directed by	Original release date
N/A	1	A Salute to the 25th Anniversary of the Hallmark Hall of Fame	Unknown	October 20, 1975
Included extracts from eight shows
114	2	Eric	James Goldstone	November 10, 1975
Starring: John Savage and Patricia Neal
115	3	Valley Forge	Fielder Cook	December 3, 1975
Starring: Richard Basehart as George Washington, with Harry Andrews
116	4	The Rivalry	Fielder Cook	December 12, 1975
Starring: Arthur Hill as Abraham Lincoln, and Charles Durning as Stephen Douglas
117	5	Caesar and Cleopatra	James Cellan Jones	February 1, 1976
Starring: Alec Guinness as Julius Caesar, and Geneviève Bujold as Cleopatra
118	6	Truman at Potsdam	George Schaefer	April 8, 1976
Starring: John Houseman as Winston Churchill, José Ferrer as Joseph Stalin, and Ed Flanders as Harry S. Truman

=== Season 26 (1976–77) ===
Hallmark no.	No. in season	Title	Directed by	Original release date
119	1	The Disappearance of Aimee	Anthony Harvey	November 17, 1976
Starring: Faye Dunaway as Aimee Semple McPherson, and Bette Davis as her mother
120	2	Beauty and the Beast	Fielder Cook	December 3, 1976
Starring: George C. Scott as the Beast, and Trish Van Devere as Belle
121	3	Peter Pan	Dwight Hemion	December 12, 1976
Starring: Mia Farrow as Peter Pan, and Danny Kaye as Captain Hook
122	4	Emily, Emily	Marc Daniels	February 7, 1977
Starring: Pamela Bellwood as Emily Ward, with James Farentino and John Forsythe. A sequel to #81. Teacher, Teacher
123	5	All Creatures Great and Small	Unknown	March 29, 1977
Rerun of #112

=== Season 27 (1977–78) ===
Hallmark no.	No. in season	Title	Directed by	Original release date
124	1	The Last Hurrah	Vincent Sherman	November 16, 1977
Starring: Carroll O'Connor and Leslie Ackerman
125	2	The Court Martial of George Armstrong Custer	Glenn Jordan	December 1, 1977
Starring: James Olson as George Armstrong Custer
126	3	Have I Got a Christmas For You	Marc Daniels	December 16, 1977
Starring: Adrienne Barbeau, Hal Linden, Milton Berle, Steve Allen and Jim Backus Shown on the same night as the first telecast of the Mikhail Baryshnikov Nutcracker.
127	4	Taxi!!!	Joseph Hardy	February 2, 1978
Starring: Martin Sheen and Eva Marie Saint

NOTE: Hallmark's #128 was "Peter Pan", a rerun of #121. The date and season have not been established.

=== Season 28 (1978–79) ===
Hallmark no.	No. in season	Title	Directed by	Original release date
129	1	Return Engagement	Joseph Hardy	November 17, 1978
Starring: Elizabeth Taylor and Joseph Bottoms
130	2	Fame	Marc Daniels	November 30, 1978
Starring: Richard Benjamin and José Ferrer
131	3	Stubby Pringle's Christmas	Burt Brinckerhoff	December 17, 1978
Starring: Beau Bridges and Julie Harris
132	4	Beauty and the Beast	Unknown	April 6, 1979
Rerun of #120

NOTE: Hallmark #132 was the last episode to air on NBC.

=== Season 29 (1979–80) ===
Hallmark no.	No. in season	Title	Directed by	Original release date
133	1	All Quiet on the Western Front	Delbert Mann	November 14, 1979
Starring: Richard Thomas and Ernest Borgnine
134	2	Aunt Mary	Peter Werner	December 5, 1979
Starring: Jean Stapleton as Mary Dobkin and Martin Balsam
135	3	Gideon's Trumpet	Robert E. Collins	April 30, 1980
Starring: Henry Fonda as Clarence Earl Gideon, and José Ferrer as Abe Fortas

NOTE: Hallmark #133 was the first episode to air on CBS.

=== Season 30 (1980–81) ===
Hallmark no.	No. in season	Title	Directed by	Original release date
136	N/A	A Tale of Two Cities	Unknown	December 2, 1980
Starring: Chris Sarandon as both Sydney Carton and Charles Darnay, Alice Krige as Lucie Manette, Billie Whitelaw as Madame Defarge, and Kenneth More as Mr. Lorry
137	1	Mister Lincoln	Gordon Rigsby	February 9, 1981
Starring: Roy Dotrice as Abraham Lincoln
138	2	Dear Liar	Gordon Rigsby	April 15, 1981
Starring: Jane Alexander as Mrs. Patrick Campbell, and Edward Herrmann as George Bernard Shaw
139	3	Casey Stengel	Nick Havinga	May 6, 1981
Starring: Charles Durning as Casey Stengel

=== Season 31 (1981–82) ===
Hallmark no.	No. in season	Title	Directed by	Original release date
140	1	The Marva Collins Story	Peter Levin	December 1, 1981
Starring: Cicely Tyson and Morgan Freeman
141	2	The Hunchback of Notre Dame	Michael Tuchner	February 4, 1982
Starring: Anthony Hopkins as Quasimodo and Lesley-Anne Down as Esmeralda. with Derek Jacobi and David Suchet

=== Season 32 (1982–83) ===
Hallmark no.	No. in season	Title	Directed by	Original release date
142	1	Witness for the Prosecution	Alan Gibson	December 4, 1982
Starring: Ralph Richardson, Diana Rigg, Deborah Kerr, Beau Bridges, Donald Pleasence, Wendy Hiller, David Langton, Richard Vernon, Peter Sallis, Michael Gough, Frank Mills, Primi Townsend and Patricia Leslie
143	2	Thursday's Child	David Lowell Rich	February 1, 1983
Starring: Gena Rowlands and Don Murray

=== Season 33 (1983–84) ===
Hallmark no.	No. in season	Title	Directed by	Original release date
144	1	The Winter of Our Discontent	Waris Hussein	December 6, 1983
Starring: Donald Sutherland, Teri Garr and Tuesday Weld
145	2	The Master of Ballantrae	Douglas Hickox	January 31, 1984
Starring: Richard Thomas, Michael York and John Gielgud

=== Season 34 (1984–85) ===
Hallmark no.	No. in season	Title	Directed by	Original release date
146	1	Camille	Desmond Davis	December 11, 1984
Starring: Greta Scacchi, Colin Firth and John Gielgud
147	2	The Corsican Brothers	Ian Sharp	February 5, 1985
Starring: Trevor Eve and Geraldine Chaplin

=== Season 35 (1985–86) ===
Hallmark no.	No. in season	Title	Directed by	Original release date
148	1	Love Is Never Silent	Joseph Sargent	December 9, 1985
Starring: Mare Winningham and Cloris Leachman
149	2	Resting Place	John Korty	April 27, 1986
Starring: John Lithgow and Morgan Freeman

=== Season 36 (1986–87) ===
Hallmark no.	No. in season	Title	Directed by	Original release date
150	N/A	Love is Never Silent	Unknown	December 1, 1986
Rerun of #148
151	1	Promise	Glenn Jordan	December 14, 1986
Starring: James Garner, James Woods and Piper Laurie
152	2	The Room Upstairs	Stuart Margolin	January 31, 1987
Starring: Stockard Channing and Sam Waterston
153	3	Pack of Lies	Anthony Page	April 26, 1987
Starring: Ellen Burstyn, Alan Bates and Teri Garr

=== Season 37 (1987–88) ===
Hallmark no.	No. in season	Title	Directed by	Original release date
154	1	The Secret Garden	Alan Grint	November 30, 1987
Starring: Gennie James and Barret Oliver
155	2	Foxfire (v, DVD)	Jud Taylor	December 13, 1987
Starring: Jessica Tandy, Hume Cronyn and John Denver
156	3	Stones for Ibarra	Jack Gold	January 29, 1988
Starring: Glenn Close and Keith Carradine
157	4	April Morning	Delbert Mann	April 24, 1988
Starring: Tommy Lee Jones and Robert Urich

=== Season 38 (1988–89) ===
Hallmark no.	No. in season	Title	Directed by	Original release date
158	1	The Tenth Man	Jack Gold	December 4, 1988
Starring: Anthony Hopkins and Kristin Scott Thomas
159	1	Promise	Glenn Jordan	December 13, 1988
Rerun of #151; Starring: James Garner, James Woods and Piper Laurie
160	2	Home Fires Burning	Glenn Jordan	January 29, 1989
Starring: Barnard Hughes and Sada Thompson
161	3	My Name is Bill W.	Daniel Petrie	April 30, 1989
Starring: James Woods, Jobeth Williams and James Garner

=== Season 39 (1989–90) ===
Hallmark no.	No. in season	Title	Directed by	Original release date
162	11	The Shell Seekers (v, DVD)	Waris Hussein	December 3, 1989
Starring: Angela Lansbury and Sam Wanamaker
163	N/A	The Secret Garden	Unknown	December 16, 1989
Rerun of #154
164	12	Face to Face	Lou Antonio	January 24, 1990
Starring: Elizabeth Montgomery and Robert Foxworth
165	13	Caroline?	Joseph Sargent	April 29, 1990
Starring: Stephanie Zimbalist, Pamela Reed and George Grizzard

=== Season 40 (1990–91) ===
Hallmark no.	No. in season	Title	Directed by	Original release date
166	1	Decoration Day (v, DVD)	Robert Markowitz	December 2, 1990
Starring: James Garner and Judith Ivey
167	N/A	Foxfire	Unknown	December 15, 1990
Rerun of #155
168	2	Sarah, Plain and Tall (v, DVD)	Glenn Jordan	February 3, 1991
Starring: Glenn Close and Christopher Walken
169	3	Shadow of a Doubt	Karen Arthur	April 28, 1991
Starring: Mark Harmon, Margaret Welsh and Norm Skaggs

=== Season 41 (1991–92) ===
Hallmark no.	No. in season	Title	Directed by	Original release date
170	1	One Against the Wind (v)	Larry Elikann	December 1, 1991
Starring: Judy Davis and Sam Neill
171	N/A	Caroline?	Unknown	December 14, 1991
Rerun of #165
172	2	O Pioneers! (v, DVD)	Glenn Jordan	February 2, 1992
Starring: Jessica Lange and David Strathairn
173	3	Miss Rose White (v)	Joseph Sargent	April 26, 1992
Starring: Kyra Sedgwick and Maximilian Schell

=== Season 42 (1992–93) ===
Hallmark no.	No. in season	Title	Directed by	Original release date
174	1	An American Story (v, DVD)	John Gray	November 29, 1992
Starring: Brad Johnson and Kathleen Quinlan
175	N/A	Sarah, Plain and Tall	Unknown	December 19, 1992
Rerun of #168
176	2	Skylark (v, DVD)	Joseph Sargent	February 7, 1993
Starring: Glenn Close and Christopher Walken; A sequel to Sarah, Plain and Tall
177	3	Blind Spot (v)	Michael Toshiyuki Uno	May 2, 1993
Starring: Joanne Woodward and Laura Linney

=== Season 43 (1993–94) ===
Hallmark no.	No. in season	Title	Directed by	Original release date
178	1	To Dance With the White Dog (v, DVD)	Glenn Jordan	December 5, 1993
Starring: Hume Cronyn and Jessica Tandy
179	N/A	O Pioneers! (v, DVD)	Unknown	December 18, 1993
Rerun of #172
180	2	Breathing Lessons (v, DVD)	John Erman	February 6, 1994
Starring: James Garner and Joanne Woodward
181	3	A Place for Annie (v)	John Gray	May 13, 1994
Starring: Sissy Spacek and Mary-Louise Parker

=== Season 44 (1994–95) ===
Hallmark no.	No. in season	Title	Directed by	Original release date
182	1	The Return of the Native (v, DVD)	Jack Gold	December 4, 1994
Starring: Catherine Zeta-Jones as Eustacia Vye and Clive Owen as Damon Wildeve
183	2	The Piano Lesson (v)	Lloyd Richards	February 5, 1995
Starring: Charles Dutton and Alfre Woodard
184	3	Redwood Curtain (v)	John Korty	April 23, 1995
Starring: Jeff Daniels and Lea Salonga

=== Season 45 (1995–96) ===
Hallmark no.	No. in season	Title	Directed by	Original release date
185	1	Journey (v)	Tom McLoughlin	December 10, 1995
Starring: Jason Robards, Brenda Fricker and Meg Tilly
186	N/A	A Season of Hope	Marcus Cole	December 10, 1995
Starring: JoBeth Williams and Ralph Waite
187	2	The Boys Next Door (DVD)	John Erman	February 4, 1996
Starring: Nathan Lane, Robert Sean Leonard, Tony Goldwyn, Michael Jeter, Courtney B. Vance and Mare Winningham
188	3	Harvest of Fire (DVD)	Arthur Allan Seidelman	April 21, 1996
Starring: Lolita Davidovich and Patty Duke

An additional program, Lily Dale, shown on June 9, 1996 is listed by the Internet Movie Database, but not the Hallmark company, as belonging to this season.

=== Season 46 (1996–97) ===
Hallmark no.	No. in season	Title	Directed by	Original release date
189	1	Calm at Sunset (v, DVD)	Daniel Petrie	December 1, 1996
Starring: Michael Moriarty, Peter Facinelli and Kate Nelligan
190	2	The Summer of Ben Tyler (v, DVD)	Arthur Allan Seidelman	December 15, 1996
Starring: James Woods and Elizabeth McGovern
191	3	Old Man (v)	John Kent Harrison	February 9, 1997
Starring: Jeanne Tripplehorn and Arliss Howard
192	4	Rose Hill (v, DVD)	Christopher Cain	April 20, 1997
Starring: Jennifer Garner and Jeffrey D. Sams

=== Season 47 (1997–98) ===
Hallmark no.	No. in season	Title	Directed by	Original release date
193	1	What the Deaf Man Heard (v, DVD)	John Kent Harrison	November 23, 1997
Starring: Matthew Modine, James Earl Jones, Claire Bloom, Judith Ivey, Jerry O'Connell, Bernadette Peters and Tom Skerritt
194	2	Ellen Foster (v, DVD)	John Erman	December 14, 1997
Starring: Jena Malone, Julie Harris and Ted Levine
195	3	The Love Letter (v, DVD)	Dan Curtis	February 1, 1998
Starring: Campbell Scott and Jennifer Jason Leigh
196	4	The Echo of Thunder (v)	Simon Wincer	April 19, 1998
Starring: Judy Davis and Jamey Sheridan

=== Season 48 (1998–99) ===
Hallmark no.	No. in season	Title	Directed by	Original release date
197	N/A	What the Deaf Man Heard	John Kent Harrison	May 31, 1998
Rerun of #193
198	1	Saint Maybe (v)	Michael Pressman	November 22, 1998
Starring: Blythe Danner, Edward Herrmann and Melina Kanakaredes
199	2	Grace and Glorie (v)	Arthur Allan Seidelman	December 13, 1998
Starring: Gena Rowlands and Diane Lane
200	3	Night Ride Home (v)	Glenn Jordan	February 7, 1999
Starring: Rebecca De Mornay, Keith Carradine, Thora Birch and Ellen Burstyn
201	4	Durango (v)	Brent Shields	April 25, 1999
Starring: Matt Keeslar and Patrick Bergin

=== Season 49 (1999–2000) ===
Hallmark no.	No. in season	Title	Directed by	Original release date
202	1	Sarah, Plain and Tall: Winter's End (v, DVD)	Glenn Jordan	November 21, 1999
Starring: Glenn Close and Christopher Walken
203	2	A Season for Miracles (v, DVD)	Michael Pressman	December 12, 1999
Starring: Carla Gugino and Kathy Baker
204	3	Missing Pieces (v)	Carl Schenkel	February 6, 2000
Starring: James Coburn and Lisa Zane
205	4	Cupid & Cate (v, DVD)	Brent Shields	May 7, 2000
Starring: Mary-Louise Parker and Peter Gallagher

=== Season 50 (2000–01) ===
Hallmark no.	No. in season	Title	Directed by	Original release date
206	1	The Lost Child (v, DVD)	Karen Arthur	November 19, 2000
Starring: Mercedes Ruehl and Jamey Sheridan
207	2	The Runaway (v, DVD)	Arthur Allan Seidelman	December 10, 2000
Starring: Dean Cain and Pat Hingle
208	3	The Flamingo Rising (v)	Martha Coolidge	February 4, 2001
Starring: William Hurt and Elizabeth McGovern
209	4	Follow the Stars Home (v, DVD)	Dick Lowry	May 6, 2001
Starring: Kimberly Williams and Campbell Scott

=== Season 51 (2001–02) ===
Hallmark no.	No. in season	Title	Directed by	Original release date
210	1	In Love and War (v, DVD)	John Kent Harrison	November 18, 2001
Starring: Callum Blue and Barbara Bobulova
211	2	The Seventh Stream (v, DVD)	John Gray	December 16, 2001
Starring: Scott Glenn and Saffron Burrows
212	3	My Sister's Keeper (v, DVD)	Ron Lagomarsino	January 27, 2002
Starring: Kathy Bates, Elizabeth Perkins and Lynn Redgrave
213	4	Little John (v, DVD)	Dick Lowry	May 5, 2002
Starring: Gloria Reuben, Ving Rhames, Robert Bailey Jr. and Patty Duke

=== Season 52 (2002–03) ===
Hallmark no.	No. in season	Title	Directed by	Original release date
214	1	The Locket (v, DVD)	Karen Arthur	December 8, 2002
Starring: Vanessa Redgrave and Michael Keddington
215	2	Brush with Fate (v, DVD)	Brent Shields	February 2, 2003
Starring: Glenn Close, Thomas Gibson and Ellen Burstyn
216	3	A Painted House (v, DVD)	Alfonso Arau	April 27, 2003
Starring: Scott Glenn, Logan Lerman, Robert Sean Leonard and Melinda Dillon

=== Season 53 (2003–04) ===
Hallmark no.	No. in season	Title	Directed by	Original release date
217	1	Fallen Angel (v, DVD)	Michael Switzer	November 26, 2003
Starring: Gary Sinise and Joely Richardson
218	2	The Blackwater Lightship (v, DVD)	John Erman	February 6, 2004
Starring: Angela Lansbury, Marijka Bardin and Sean Campion
219	3	Plainsong (v, DVD)	Richard Pearce	April 25, 2004
Starring: Aidan Quinn and Rachel Griffiths

=== Season 54 (2004–05) ===
Hallmark no.	No. in season	Title	Directed by	Original release date
220	N/A	A Painted House	Unknown	September 12, 2004
Rerun of #216
221	1	Back When We Were Grownups (v, DVD)	Ron Underwood	November 21, 2004
Starring: Blythe Danner, Faye Dunaway, Peter Fonda, Jack Palance, Peter Riegert and Ione Skye
222	N/A	Fallen Angel	Unknown	December 19, 2004
Rerun of #217
223	2	The Magic of Ordinary Days (v, DVD)	Brent Shields	January 30, 2005
Starring: Keri Russell and Skeet Ulrich
224	3	Riding the Bus with My Sister (v, DVD)	Anjelica Huston	May 1, 2005
Starring: Rosie O'Donnell and Andie MacDowell

=== Season 55 (2005–06) ===
Hallmark no.	No. in season	Title	Directed by	Original release date
225	1	Silver Bells (v, DVD)	Dick Lowry	November 27, 2005
Starring: Tate Donovan and Anne Heche
226	2	The Water Is Wide (v, DVD)	John Kent Harrison	January 29, 2006
Starring: Alfre Woodard and Jeff Hephner
227	3	In from the Night (v, DVD)	Peter Levin	April 23, 2006
Starring: Marcia Gay Harden and Thomas Gibson

=== Season 56 (2006–07) ===
Hallmark no.	No. in season	Title	Directed by	Original release date
228	1	Candles on Bay Street (v, DVD)	John Erman	November 26, 2006
Starring: Alicia Silverstone, Annabeth Gish and Polly Bergen
229	2	The Valley of Light (v, DVD)	Brent Shields	January 28, 2007
Starring: Chris Klein and Gretchen Mol
230	3	Crossroads: A Story of Forgiveness (v, DVD)	John Kent Harrison	April 22, 2007
Starring: Dean Cain and Peri Gilpin

=== Season 57 (2007–08) ===
Hallmark no.	No. in season	Title	Directed by	Original release date
231	1	Pictures of Hollis Woods (DVD)	Tony Bill	December 2, 2007
Starring: Sissy Spacek and Alfre Woodard
232	2	The Russell Girl (DVD)	Jeff Bleckner	January 27, 2008
Starring: Amber Tamblyn and Jennifer Ehle
233	3	Sweet Nothing in My Ear (DVD)	Joseph Sargent	April 20, 2008
Starring: Jeff Daniels and Marlee Matlin

=== Season 58 (2008–09) ===
Hallmark no.	No. in season	Title	Directed by	Original release date
234	1	Front of the Class (DVD)	Peter Werner	December 7, 2008
Starring: Jimmy Wolk and Treat Williams
235	2	Loving Leah (DVD)	Jeff Bleckner	January 25, 2009
Starring: Lauren Ambrose and Adam Kaufman
236	3	The Courageous Heart of Irena Sendler (DVD)	John Kent Harrison	April 19, 2009
Starring: Anna Paquin and Marcia Gay Harden

=== Season 59 (2009–10) ===
Hallmark no.	No. in season	Title	Directed by	Original release date
237	1	A Dog Named Christmas (DVD)	Peter Werner	November 29, 2009
Starring: Bruce Greenwood
238	2	The Magic of Ordinary Days	Unknown	January 30, 2010
Rerun of #223
239	3	When Love Is Not Enough: The Lois Wilson Story (DVD)	John Kent Harrison	April 25, 2010
Starring: Winona Ryder

=== Season 60 (2010–11) ===
Hallmark no.	No. in season	Title	Directed by	Original release date
240	1	November Christmas	Robert Harmon	November 28, 2010
Starring: John Corbett and Sam Elliott
241	2	The Lost Valentine (DVD)	Darnell Martin	January 30, 2011
Starring: Jennifer Love Hewitt and Betty White
242	3	Beyond the Blackboard	Jeff Bleckner	April 24, 2011
Starring: Emily VanCamp, Timothy Busfield, Treat Williams

On May 6, 2011, CBS announced that they had cancelled the Hallmark Hall of Fame from their network.

=== Season 61 (2011–12) ===
Hallmark no.	No. in season	Title	Directed by	Original release date
243	1	Have a Little Faith	Jon Avnet	November 27, 2011
Starring: Laurence Fishburne, Bradley Whitford, and Martin Landau
244	2	A Smile as Big as the Moon	James Steven Sadwith	January 29, 2012
Starring: John Corbett
245	3	Firelight	Darnell Martin	April 22, 2012
Starring: Cuba Gooding Jr.

=== Season 62 (2012–13) ===
Hallmark no.	No. in season	Title	Directed by	Original release date
246	1	Christmas with Holly	Allan Arkush	December 9, 2012
Starring: Sean Faris
247	2	The Makeover	John Gray	January 27, 2013
Starring: Julia Stiles
248	3	Remember Sunday (DVD with, and without a "Behind the Scenes" feature).	Jeff Bleckner	April 21, 2013
Starring: Zachary Levi and Alexis Bledel

=== Season 63 (2013–14) ===
Hallmark no.	No. in season	Title	Directed by	Original release date
249	1	Christmas in Conway	John Kent Harrison	December 1, 2013
Starring: Andy Garcia, Mandy Moore, and Mary-Louise Parker
250	2	In My Dreams	Kenny Leon	April 20, 2014
Starring: Katharine McPhee, Mike Vogel, and JoBeth Williams

From this point onward, all episodes will be seen exclusively on the Hallmark Channel.

=== Season 64 (2014–15) ===
Hallmark no.	No. in season	Title	Directed by	Original release date
251	1	One Christmas Eve	Jay Russell	November 30, 2014
Starring: Anne Heche
252	2	Away & Back	Jeff Bleckner	January 26, 2015
Starring: Jason Lee and Minka Kelly

=== Season 65 (2015) ===
Hallmark no.	No. in season	Title	Directed by	Original release date
253	1	Just in Time for Christmas	Sean McNamara	December 5, 2015
Starring: Eloise Mumford, Michael Stahl-David, Christopher Lloyd, William Shatner

=== Season 66 (2016–17) ===
Hallmark no.	No. in season	Title	Directed by	Original release date
254	1	A Heavenly Christmas	Paul Shapiro	November 26, 2016
Starring: Kristin Davis, Eric McCormack, Shirley MacLaine
255	2	Love Locks	Martin Wood	January 28, 2017
Starring: Rebecca Romijn, Jerry O'Connell, Bruce Davison

=== Season 67 (2017–18) ===
Hallmark no.	No. in season	Title	Directed by	Original release date
256	1	The Christmas Train	Ron Oliver	November 25, 2017
Starring: Dermot Mulroney, Kimberly Williams-Paisley, Danny Glover, Joan Cusack
257	2	The Beach House	Roger Spottiswoode	April 28, 2018
Starring: Minka Kelly, Andie MacDowell, Chad Michael Murray, Makenzie Vega

=== Season 68 (2018–19) ===
Hallmark no.	No. in season	Title	Directed by	Original release date
258	1	Christmas Everlasting	Ron Oliver	November 24, 2018
Starring: Tatyana Ali, Dondré T. Whitfield, Dennis Haysbert, Patti LaBelle
259	2	Love Takes Flight	Steven R. Monroe	April 27, 2019
Starring: Nikki DeLoach and Jeff Hephner

=== Season 69 (2019–20) ===
Hallmark no.	No. in season	Title	Directed by	Original release date
260	1	A Christmas Love Story	Eric Close	December 7, 2019
Starring: Kristin Chenoweth, Scott Wolf, Keith Robinson, Kevin Quinn

== See also ==
- List of Hallmark Channel Original Movies (and Category)
- List of programs broadcast by Hallmark Channel (and Category)
