= Lehman Engel =

American composer and conductor

A. Lehman Engel

Background information
- Born: September 14, 1910; Jackson, Mississippi, U.S.
- Died: August 29, 1982 (aged 71) New York City, U.S.
- Genres: Classical, Musical Theatre
- Occupations: Composer, Conductor, Author, Musical director, Librettist

A. Lehman Engel (September 14, 1910 – August 29, 1982) was an American composer for television, film, and operas and a conductor of Broadway musicals and operas.He was nominated five times and won twice a Tony Award for Best Conductor and Musical Director, a category which no longer exists.

== Work in opera, theatre, television and films ==
Engel worked in various positions on television specials. He was the composer and conductor of the music for the famed 1954 television production of Shakespeare's Macbeth, starring Maurice Evans and Judith Anderson. However, he did not work on the 1960 remake starring the same two actors.

He was the conductor of the television version of Leonard Bernstein's Wonderful Town (1958) (TV). In the preceding years, he also conducted the Hallmark Hall of Fame's productions of Shakespeare's The Taming of the Shrew (1956), Twelfth Night (1957), and The Tempest (1960) and the Broadway musicals Shangri-La (1956) and Li'l Abner (1956). He also musically directed and vocally arranged the 1959 musical Take Me Along.

Lehman Engel worked as musical director for the St. Louis Municipal Opera for several years before moving to New York to conduct on Broadway.

Engel also composed the music for the 1939 Broadway revival of Hamlet, starring Maurice Evans; the original 1948 stage production of Maxwell Anderson's Anne of the Thousand Days, starring Rex Harrison and Joyce Redman; and for the 1960 play There Was a Little Girl, starring Jane Fonda and Dean Jones.

In 1965, he served as the musical director for the Broadway production of La Grosse Valise (composer Gérard Calvi, lyrics by Harold Rome)

== The BMI Lehman Engel Musical Theatre Workshop ==
Engel founded the BMI Lehman Engel Musical Theatre Workshop, a workshop in New York for musical theatre composers, lyricists, and librettists. He also founded and personally supervised the Lehman Engel Musical Theater Workshop, a branch of the BMI workshop, originally based at the Performing Arts Center of the Los Angeles County Music Center in Los Angeles.

== Recordings ==
Engel also conducted the first 3-LP version of George Gershwin's opera Porgy and Bess, a 1951 Columbia Masterworks Records album that was highly acclaimed, but was advertised as featuring the complete opera when it did not. The mono recording, starring Lawrence Winters and Camilla Williams, was eventually released on CD. It was the longest Porgy and Bess album at the time (129 minutes), and remained so for many years until it was superseded in the 1970s by two complete recordings of the opera, both of which won Grammys.

Between the late 1940s and early 1950s, under the supervision of Columbia Records executive Goddard Lieberson, Engel conducted what were then the most complete recordings of several classic Broadway musicals of the past, many of which were appearing as albums for the first time – among them Girl Crazy (with Mary Martin performing both Ginger Rogers and Ethel Merman's old stage roles), Oh, Kay! (with Barbara Ruick as Kay and Jack Cassidy as Jimmy de Winter), Babes in Arms (again featuring Cassidy and Mary Martin), and Pal Joey (with Harold Lang in the title role and Vivienne Segal repeating her original 1940 stage role as Vera Simpson). All of these were studio recordings, not original cast albums. The Pal Joey recording was so successful that it led to a major, long-running revival of the show in 1952, with the same two stars who performed on the album: Vivienne Segal, who starred in the original 1940 stage production, and Harold Lang.

In 1952, he also conducted the most complete recordings to that time of Oklahoma! and The Student Prince. The Oklahoma! album used Robert Russell Bennett's original orchestrations and starred Nelson Eddy as the cowboy Curly.

Engel conducted studio recordings of Carousel in 1955 for RCA Victor. The recordings featured Robert Merrill as Billy Bigelow, Patrice Munsel as Julie Jordan, and Florence Henderson as Carrie. In 1956, he conducted a studio recording of Show Boat with Robert Merrill singing the roles of both Ravenal and the black stevedore Joe, Ms. Munsel as Magnolia, and Risë Stevens as Julie La Verne. These recordings were more complete than previous recordings of these shows.

All of these recordings were eventually issued on CD and were milestones in their time for their completeness.

== As author ==
Engel also wrote several books on musical theatre. One of them, The American Musical Theatre: A Consideration, was perhaps the very first book to discuss in detail the writing of a Broadway musical, the elements that went into it, and the art of adapting "straight" plays into musicals.

Engel was close friends with Pablo Picasso. He also mentored Maury Yeston, who succeeded him in teaching the BMI Lehman Engel Musical Theater Workshop, Alan Menken, Stephen Flaherty, Andrew MacBean, Joseph Byrd, and Edward Kleban.
