= 13th Primetime Emmy Awards =

1961 American television programming awards

- Date: May 16, 1961
- Location: Moulin Rogue Nightclub, Los Angeles, California
- Presented by: Academy of Television Arts and Sciences
- Hosted by: Dick Powell

Highlights
- Most awards: Hallmark Hall of Fame: "Macbeth" (5)
- Most nominations: Hallmark Hall of Fame (5)
- Outstanding Program Achievement in the Field of Humor: The Jack Benny Show
- Outstanding Program Achievement in the Field of Drama: Hallmark Hall of Fame: "Macbeth"
- Outstanding Program Achievement in the Field of Variety: Astaire Time
- Outstanding Achievement in the Field of Children's Programming: Young People's Concerts
- The Program of the Year: Hallmark Hall of Fame: "Macbeth"

Television/radio coverage
- Network: NBC

The 13th Emmy Awards, later referred to as the 13th Primetime Emmy Awards, were held on May 16, 1961, to honor the best in television of the year. It was hosted by Joey Bishop and Dick Powell. All nominations are listed, with winners in bold and series' networks are in parentheses.

The top show of the night was the NBC anthology Hallmark Hall of Fame for their production of Macbeth. It won in all its nominated categories, tying the record (since broken) of five major wins. A milestone was set by The Flintstones, it became the first ever animated show to be nominated in one of the main series categories (comedy or drama). It would be the only animated show to accomplish this feat until 2009, when Family Guy was included in the expanded comedy field.

== Winners and nominees ==
Winners and nominees are listed below.

=== Programs ===
Programs
**Outstanding Program Achievement in the Field of Humor**: **The Jack Benny Show (CBS)**; The Andy Griffith Show (CBS); The Bob Hope Show (NBC); Candid Camera (CBS); The Flintstones (ABC)	**Outstanding Program Achievement in the Field of Drama**: **Hallmark Hall of Fame: "Macbeth" (NBC)**; Naked City (ABC); Sacco-Vanzetti Story (NBC); The Twilight Zone (CBS); The Untouchables (ABC)
**Outstanding Program Achievement in the Field of Variety**: **Astaire Time (NBC)**; Belafonte New York (CBS); The Garry Moore Show (CBS); An Hour with Danny Kaye (CBS); The Jack Paar Tonight Show (NBC)	**Outstanding Achievement in the Field of Children's Programming**: **Young People's Concerts: Aaron Copland Birthday Party (CBS)**; Captain Kangaroo (CBS); The Huckleberry Hound Show (Syndicated); The Shari Lewis Show (NBC); Shirley Temple Theatre (NBC)
**Outstanding Program Achievement in the Field of Public Service**: **The Twentieth Century (CBS)**; CBS Reports (CBS); NBC White Paper (NBC); Project XX (NBC); Winston Churchill: The Valiant Years (ABC)	**The Program of the Year**: **Hallmark Hall of Fame: "Macbeth" (NBC)**; 1960 Presidential Nominating Conventions (NBC); Astaire Time (NBC); An Hour with Danny Kaye (CBS); Sacco-Vanzetti Story (NBC)

=== Acting ===
==== Lead performances ====
Acting
**Outstanding Performance by an Actor in a Series (Lead)**: **Raymond Burr as Perry Mason in Perry Mason (CBS)**; Jackie Cooper as Lt. Chick Hennesey in Hennesey (CBS); Robert Stack as Eliot Ness in The Untouchables (ABC)	**Outstanding Performance by an Actress in a Series (Lead)**: **Barbara Stanwyck as herself in The Barbara Stanwyck Show (NBC)**; Donna Reed as Donna Stone in The Donna Reed Show (ABC); Loretta Young as herself in The Loretta Young Show (NBC)

==== Supporting performances ====
**Outstanding Performance in a Supporting Role** **by an Actor or Actress in a Series**: **Don Knotts as Deputy Barney Fife in The Andy Griffith Show (CBS)**; Abby Dalton as Lt. Martha Hale in Hennesey (CBS); Barbara Hale as Della Street in Perry Mason (CBS)	**Outstanding Performance in a Supporting Role** **by an Actor or Actress in a Single Program**: **Roddy McDowall as Philip Hamilton in Equitable's American Heritage (NBC)**; Charles Bronson as Soldier Conlon in General Electric Theater (CBS): "Memory in White"; Peter Falk as Sydney Jarmon in The Law and Mr. Jones (ABC): "Cold Turkey"

==== Single performances ====
**Outstanding Single Performance by an Actor in a Leading Role**: **Maurice Evans as Macbeth in Hallmark Hall of Fame: "Macbeth" (NBC)**; Cliff Robertson as Charlie Gordon in The United States Steel Hour (CBS): "The Two Worlds of Charlie Gordon"; Ed Wynn as himself in Desilu Playhouse (CBS): "The Man in the Funny Suit"	**Outstanding Single Performance by an Actress in a Leading Role**: **Judith Anderson as Lady Macbeth in Hallmark Hall of Fame: "Macbeth" (NBC)**; Ingrid Bergman as Clare Lester in Twenty-Four Hours in a Woman's Life (CBS); Elizabeth Montgomery as Rusty Heller in The Untouchables (ABC): "The Rusty Heller Story"

=== Directing ===
Directing
**Outstanding Directorial Achievement in Comedy**: **The Danny Thomas Show (CBS) – Sheldon Leonard**; The Bob Hope Show (NBC) – Jack Shea and Dick McDonough; My Three Sons (ABC) – Peter Tewksbury	**Outstanding Directorial Achievement in Drama**: **Hallmark Hall of Fame (NBC): "Macbeth" – George Schaefer**; Desilu Playhouse (CBS): "The Man in the Funny Suit" – Ralph Nelson; Sacco-Vanzetti Story (NBC) – Sidney Lumet

=== Writing ===
Writing
**Outstanding Writing Achievement in Comedy**: **The Red Skelton Show (CBS) – Sherwood Schwartz, Dave O'Brien, Al Schwartz, Martin Ragaway and Red Skelton**; The Danny Thomas Show (CBS) – Charles Stewart and Jack Elinson; Hennesey (CBS) – Richard Baer	**Outstanding Writing Achievement in Drama**: **The Twilight Zone (CBS) – Rod Serling**; The DuPont Show of the Month (CBS): "The Lincoln Murder Case" – Dale Wasserman; Sacco-Vanzetti Story (NBC) – Reginald Rose
**Outstanding Writing Achievement in the Documentary Field**: **Winston Churchill: The Valiant Years (ABC) – Victor Wolfson**; CBS Reports (CBS): "Harvest of Shame" – Fred W. Friendly, David Lowe and Edward R. Murrow; NBC White Paper (NBC): "The U-2 Affair" – Arthur Barron and Al Wasserman

== Most major nominations ==
Networks with multiple major nominations (Note: "Major" constitutes the categories listed above: Program, Acting, Directing, and Writing. Does not include the technical categories.)
Network	Number of Nominations
CBS	29
NBC	24
ABC	9

Programs with multiple major nominations
Program	Category	Network	Number of Nominations
Hallmark Hall of Fame: "Macbeth"	Drama	NBC	5
Sacco-Vanzetti Story	Drama	NBC	4
Hennesey	Comedy	CBS	3
The Untouchables	Drama	ABC	3
The Andy Griffith Show	Comedy	CBS	2
Astaire Time	Variety	NBC	2
The Bob Hope Show	Comedy	NBC	2
CBS Reports	Documentary/Public Affairs	CBS	2
The Danny Thomas Show	Comedy	CBS	2
Desilu Playhouse	Drama	CBS	2
An Hour with Danny Kaye	Variety	CBS	2
NBC White Paper	Documentary/Public Affairs	NBC	2
Perry Mason	Drama	CBS	2
The Twilight Zone	Drama	CBS	2
Winston Churchill: The Valiant Years	Documentary/Public Affairs	ABC	2

== Most major awards ==
Networks with multiple major awards
Network	Number of Awards
CBS	8
NBC	8

Programs with multiple major awards
Program	Category	Network	Number of Awards
Hallmark Hall of Fame: "Macbeth"	Drama	NBC	5
