= Cradle Song (1956 film) =

- Hallmark Hall of Fame episode
- Episode no.: Season 5 Episode 15
- Directed by: George Schaefer
- Teleplay by: James Costigan
- Based on: Canción de cuna 1911 play by: Gregorio Martinez Sierra; María Martínez Sierra
- Original air date: May 6, 1956
- Running time: 90 minutes

Guest appearances
- Judith Anderson; Siobhan McKenna; Evelyn Varden; Dierdre Owens; Barry Jones; Anthony Franciosa

Episode chronology
| ← Previous "The Taming of the Shrew" | Next → "Born Yesterday" |

"Cradle Song" is a 1956 American TV film for the Hallmark Hall of Fame, directed by George Schaefer.

== Plot ==
An infant is reared by nuns in a convent.

== Cast ==
- Maurice Evans, host
- Judith Anderson as The Prioress
- Siobhán McKenna as Sister Joanna of the Cross
- Evelyn Varden as The Vicaress
- Dierdre Owens as Teresa
- Barry Jones as The Doctor
- Anthony Franciosa as Antonio

== Production ==
Both Susan Strasberg–originally slotted to play "Teresa"—and Helen Hayes, cast as the Vicaress, were forced to bow out due to illness; Strasberg was going to star but had to pull out when her husband fell ill.

The episode was filmed at NBC Brooklyn in the Midwood section of that borough. Music was performed by guitarist Julian Prol. with costumes designed by Noel Taylor and settings by Robert Wightman.

== Reception ==
New York Times Critic Jack Gould called it "one of the most beautiful and deeply stirring programs television has ever offered.".

== 1960 production ==
The play was filmed again in 1960 with the same director and many of the same cast.

=== 1960 Cast ===
- Judith Anderson
- Siobhán McKenna
- Helen Hayes
- Kathy Willard
- Charles Bickford
- Geoffrey Horne
