= The Chinese Prime Minister =

The Chinese Prime Minister is a 1974 American TV film. It was an episode of Hollywood Television Theatre on PBS.

It was based on a play by Enid Bagnold. This was presented on Broadway in 1965 with Edith Evans.

== Plot ==
A 70 year old actress has retired from the stage but not life.

== Cast ==
- Judith Anderson as She
- Richard Clarke as Tarver
- Peter Coffield as Oliver
- Kathleen Miller as Roxane

== Reception ==
One review said "it just misses". The Los Angeles Times called it an "exquisite production".
