= Medea (1959 film) =

- Directed by: José Quintero and H. Wesley Kenney
- Written by: Robinson Jeffers
- Based on: Medea by Euripides
- Produced by: David Susskind
- Starring: Judith Anderson
- Music by: "Binny"
- Distributed by: WTNA
- Release date: October 12, 1959
- Running time: 100 minutes
- Country: United States
- Language: English

Medea is a 1959 American TV play. It is based on the adaptation of the play by Euripides. Judith Anderson plays the title role, which she had performed on stage since 1948.

It was the first in a series called Play of the Week on the TV station WTNA. David Susskind produced. The production budget for each show was around $35,000.

== Cast ==
- Judith Anderson as Medea
- Aline McMahon as the Nurse
- Don McHenry as the Tutor
- Ricky and Mannie Sloane as the Children
- Colleen Dewhurst as First Woman of Corinth
- Jacqueline Brookes as Second Woman of Corinth
- Betty Miller as Third Woman of Corinth
- Morris Carnovsky as Creon
- Henry Brandon as Jason
- Eric Berry as Aegeus
- Michael Wager as Jason's Slave
- Mareta Redfield and Barbara Balgakov as Two Attendants to Medea
- Phillip Minor, Michael O'Reily, Edward Abbey and Richard Buck as Four Soldiers

== Reception ==
The New York Times praised Anderson as giving "a performance of stunning and enveloping power."

The Los Angeles Times called it a "tour de force" although said it was "theatre not television."
