= The File on Devlin =

1969 film by George Schaefer

The File on Devlin is a 1969 American TV film for the Hallmark Hall of Fame, and was directed by George Schaefer. It was based on a novel by Catherine Gaskin.

== Plot ==
The film follows a young woman drawn into Cold War intrigue after her father, a Nobel Prize-winning author, disappears while travelling near the Russian border. Left in possession of his unfinished manuscript, she becomes embroiled in a dispute over the work with her estranged stepmother and attracts the attention of a journalist whose motives are unclear. She soon discovers that the manuscript has attracted the interest of intelligence agencies from several countries, making it difficult to know whom she can trust.

== Cast ==
- Judith Anderson
- Elizabeth Ashley
- David McCallum
- Helmut Dantine
- Donald Moffatt

== Production ==
The novel was published in 1965.

George Schaefer had just directed the feature film Pendulum. He called the film "an old fashioned spy story with a mysterious disappearance, an old castle, dark corridors and secret passages, great fun."

Elizabeth Ashley made it after having been retired for five years. Rehearsals started in July 1969, and it was mostly shot in the studio with two days location.

== Reception ==
One review called it "a thriller that thrilled indifferently." The New York Times called it "an overstuffed, improbable bit of claptrap without suspense, wit or intelligence."
