= Luther Greene =

American theatrical producer and landscaper

- Born: 1909
- Died: June 1987 (aged 77–78)
- Occupation: Theatrical producer

Luther Greene (1909–1987) was an American theatrical producer and landscaper. He was also active in landscaping business and designed rooftop gardens countrywide.

== Personal life ==
He was born in Virginia and received his education the University of Virginia.

He married an actress, Judith Anderson in July 1946 and divorced in 1951.

== Career ==
Greene started his career as a producer with a play, Ghosts, starring, Alla Nazimova.

In June 1987, he died at the age of 78.

== Filmography ==
- Farewell to Manzanar (1976)
- Hardware Wars (1978)
- Dim Sum: A Little Bit of Heart (1985)
- Mark Twain (1985)
