= List of programs broadcast by Hallmark Channel =

This is a list of television programs that have aired on the Hallmark Channel in the United States, including current and former programming. For international versions of the channel, see Hallmark Channel (international). Programs that premiered before August 2001 originally aired when the channel was branded as Odyssey.

== Current programming ==
=== Drama ===
Title	Genre	Premiere	Seasons	Length	Status
When Calls the Heart	Historical Western romance drama	January 11, 2014	13 seasons, 132 episodes	39–84 min	Season 14 due to premiere on January 3, 2027
Mistletoe Murders	Mystery drama	October 31, 2024	2 seasons, 12 episodes	42 min	Renewed
The Chicken Sisters (season 2) (Note: Season 1 initially premiered on Hallmark+.)	Drama	August 10, 2025	1 season, 8 episodes	42 min	Pending

=== Unscripted ===
==== Reality ====
Title	Genre	Premiere	Seasons	Length	Status
The Motherhood	Reality	May 5, 2025	1 season, 6 episodes	44 min	Pending
Celebrations with Lacey Chabert (season 2)	Reality	September 15, 2025	1 season, 8 episodes	42 min	Pending
Baked with Love: Holiday	Baking reality competition	October 27, 2025	1 season, 8 episodes	43–44 min	Pending
Finding Mr. Christmas (season 2)	Reality competition	October 27, 2025	2 seasons, 17 episodes	42 min	Pending

=== Hallmark+ ===
Title	Genre	Premiere	Seasons	Length	Status
Small Town Setup	Dating show	January 2, 2025	1 season, 6 episodes	42 min	Pending
Home Is Where the Heart Is	Reality	March 20, 2025	1 season, 6 episodes	38–42 min	Pending
Christmas at Sea	Reality	July 7, 2025	2 seasons, 8 episodes	40–43 min	Pending
Second Chance Love	Dating show	January 1, 2026	1 season, 8 episodes	42–44 min	Pending
Hope Valley: 1874	Historical Western romance drama	March 21, 2026	1 season, 8 episodes	42–44 min	Renewed

=== Syndicated ===
- Heartland (2025)
- Psych (2025)
- Drop Dead Diva (2024)
- Frasier (2011)
- Cheers (2008)
- Reba (2020)
- The Golden Girls (2009)
- The Waltons (2004)

== Upcoming programming ==
=== Unscripted ===
==== Reality ====
Title	Genre	Premiere	Seasons	Length	Status
Armed to Build	Reality	2026	TBA	TBA	Series order
Murder Mystery House	Reality competition	2026	TBA	TBA	Series order

=== Hallmark+ ===
Title	Genre	Premiere	Seasons	Length	Status
Change of Heart	Drama	2027	TBA	TBA	Series order

== Former programming ==
=== Morning ===
- Donna's Day (1999–2001)
- Telling Stories with Tomie dePaola (August–October 2001)
- Home & Family (October 1, 2012 – August 4, 2021)

=== Original ===
==== Drama ====
Title	Premiere date	Finale date	Note(s)
Cedar Cove	July 20, 2013	September 26, 2015	
Signed, Sealed, Delivered	April 20, 2014	June 22, 2014	Turned into a film series.
Good Witch	February 28, 2015	July 25, 2021	
Chesapeake Shores	August 16, 2016	October 16, 2022	
When Hope Calls	February 23, 2020	April 26, 2020	Moved to Great American Family from season 2 onward.
The Way Home	January 15, 2023	June 21, 2026	
Ride	March 26, 2023	May 28, 2023	
Providence Falls	August 2, 2025	August 16, 2025	Miniseries
Twelve Dates 'Til Christmas	December 5, 2025	December 19, 2025	Miniseries

==== Reality ====
Title	Premiere date	Finale date	Note(s)
Meet the Peetes	February 18, 2018	April 29, 2019	
Mom's the Bride	May 7, 2026	June 4, 2026	Miniseries

==== Variety ====
Title	Premiere date	Finale date	Note(s)
Inspiration, Please!	October 1, 1995	1998	Aired as reruns until June 26, 1999.
CeCe's Place	October 5, 1997	August 1, 2001	

=== Hallmark+ ===
Title	Premiere date	Finale date	Note(s)
Celebrations with Lacey Chabert	September 10, 2024	November 7, 2024	Premiered on the Hallmark Channel from season 2 onward.
The Chicken Sisters	September 10, 2024	October 24, 2024	Premiered on the Hallmark Channel from season 2 onward.
Finding Mr. Christmas	October 31, 2024	December 12, 2024	Premiered on the Hallmark Channel from season 2 onward.
Holidazed	November 14, 2024	December 24, 2024	Miniseries
Ready, Set, Glow!	December 12, 2024		
Paris Is Always a Good Idea	July 30, 2026	August 27, 2026	Miniseries

=== Specials ===
- Kitten Bowl (2014-2021; moved to GAC Family in 2023)
- Cat Bowl (2019-2020; Version of Kitten Bowl with fully-grown cats.)

=== Syndicated ===
- 7th Heaven (2008–2010)
- The Addams Family (2010)
- The Adventures of the Black Stallion (1996–1998)
- Agapeland (1993–1994)
- Airwaves (1992–1993)
- ALF (1999–2002)
- Alfred Hitchcock Hour (2003)
- Aliens in the Family (1999–2000)
- America's Funniest Home Videos (2001-2002, 2010)
- The Archie Show (1999–2000)
- Avonlea (1999–2001)
- Beauty and the Beast (1999–2001)
- The Beverly Hillbillies (2003–2005)
- Bewitched (2001–2003)
- The Big Valley (2003–2005)
- The Bob Newhart Show (2012)
- Bonanza (2002–2006)
- Born Free (1995–1996)
- The Brady Bunch (2013–2014; 2016)
- Brentwood Kids (1996–1997)
- Brooklyn Bridge (1996–1998)
- Camp Cariboo (1996–1998)
- The Campbells (1992–1996)
- Christy (2000–2001)
- Columbo (2005–2007)**
- The Courtship of Eddie's Father (1996–1998)
- Davey and Goliath (1992–1999)
- Diagnosis: Murder (2006–2008)**
- Doc (2010)
- Doogie Howser, M.D. (1999–2000)
- Dr. Quinn, Medicine Woman (2000–2005)***
- Emeril's Table *
- Empty Nest (2011)
- The Equalizer (2003–2004)
- Everyday Food*
- The Facts of Life (2002)
- Family Ties (2006)
- Fat Albert and the Cosby Kids (1999–2000)
- Father Murphy (1995–1999)
- Fraggle Rock (1999–2001)
- Fraggle Rock: The Animated Series (1999–2000)
- Fred Penner's Place (1997–1998)
- From Martha's Garden*
- From Martha's Home*
- From Martha's Kitchen*
- Frugal Gourmet (1995–1997)
- Full House (2018)
- Gerbert (1993–1997)
- The Ghost of Faffner Hall (1999)
- Gilligan's Island (2004–2005)
- The Good Wife **
- Gunsmoke (1996–2005)
- Happy Days (2000–2001; 2013)
- Hart to Hart (2001–2002)**
- Hawaii Five-O (2003–2004)
- Home Improvement (2013-2014; 2016-2017)
- I Dream of Jeannie (2001–2003)
- I Love Lucy (2009–2020)
- Jack Hanna's Animal Adventures (2009–2010)
- JAG (2004–2006)
- Jane Doe miniseries **
- Jim Henson's Animal Show (1999–2001)
- Join In! (1992–1993)
- Joy Junction (1992–1993)
- Just Kids (1992–1997)
- Judging Amy (2005)
- Kingdom Adventure (1994–1995)
- Kojak movies
- Last Man Standing (2016–2017)
- Laura McKenzie's Traveler *
- Little House on the Prairie (2003–2016)
- Mad Hungry with Lucinda Scala Quinn *
- The Magnificent Seven (2003–2004)
- Marie*
- Marshal Dillon (2002–2003)
- Martha Bakes *
- The Martha Stewart Show *
- The Mary Tyler Moore Show (2012)
- M*A*S*H (2003–2012)
- Matlock (2003–2009)***
- Max Glick (1994–1996)
- McBride miniseries **
- The Middle (2014–2022)
- Mother Goose Stories (1999–2000)
- The Munsters (2010)
- Muppet Babies (1999–2000)
- The Muppet Show (1999–2001)
- Murder, She Wrote (2007–2009)**
- My Three Sons (2000–2002)
- Mystery Woman miniseries **
- The Nature of Things (1993–1996)
- New Morning with Timberly Whitfield
- Northern Exposure (2001–2005)
- Numbers (2012–2013)
- Once Upon a Hamster (1997–1999)
- Our House (1996–1999)
- Palmerstown, U.S.A. (1995–1996)
- The Partridge Family (2010)
- Peppermint Place (1994–1997)
- Perry Mason (2002–2008)**
- Petkeeping with Marc Morrone
- Quigley's Village (1992–1993)
- Ramona (1996–1997)
- Rawhide (2002-2004)
- Rescue 911 (2000–2001)
- The Rifleman (2001–2005)
- The Rockford Files movies
- Secret Life of Toys (2000)
- Sister Kate (1998–1999)
- Snowy River: The McGregor Saga (1999–2001)
- The Sullivans (1992–1996)
- Sunshine Factory (1992–1996)
- Today's Special (1992–1996)
- Trapper John, M.D. (1998–1999)
- Touched by an Angel (2002–2011)***
- The Virginian (2003–2005)
- Walker, Texas Ranger (2004–2009)
- The Waltons (2003–2009; 2011–2016)
- Whatever, Martha! *
- Whatever with Alexis and Jennifer*
- Whatever, You're Wrong! *
- Who Let the Dogs Out?
- Who's the Boss? (2010–2011)
- Wind at My Back (2000–2001)
- Zoobilee Zoo (1999–2000)

(*) – programs that formerly aired on Hallmark Channel Daytime

(**) – programming currently airs on sister station Hallmark Movies & Mysteries

(***) – programming currently airs on sister station Hallmark Drama

== See also ==
- List of Hallmark Channel Original Movies (and Category)
- List of Hallmark Hall of Fame episodes (and Category)
