= Elizabeth the Queen (film) =

1968 television film by George Schaefer

- Based on: Elizabeth the Queen
- Written by: Maxwell Anderson
- Story by: John Edward Friend
- Directed by: George Schaefer
- Starring: Judith Anderson; Charlton Heston
- Country of origin: United States
- Original language: English

Production
- Running time: 90
- Production company: Crown Media Productions

Original release
- Network: NBC
- Release: January 24, 1968

Related
- Hallmark Hall of Fame

Elizabeth the Queen is a 1968 television movie presented on Hallmark Hall of Fame. It is an adaptation of the 1930 play Elizabeth the Queen by Maxwell Anderson. The film was directed by George Schaefer.

== Cast ==
- Judith Anderson as Queen Elizabeth I
- Charlton Heston as Robert Devereaux, Earl of Essex
- Michael Allinson as Sir Walter Raleigh
- Alan Caillou as Burbage
- Jody Carter as Lady In Waiting
- Peter Church as Hemmings
- Dana Elcar as Captain Marvel
- Lynn Harper as Ann Rousseau
- Harvey Jason as Herald
- Donald Marlatt as Irish Courier
- Anne Rogers as Penelope
- Gilchrist Stuart as Physician
- Harry Townes as Sir Robert Cecil

== Production ==
In 1964 George Schaefer said he had decided not to do a production of this or another Maxwell Anderson play, Mary Queen of Scot, because they depended on pageantry, which was hard to do on television.

Schaefer changed his mind and Judith Anderson signed to star in a production in May 1967. It was her third production for the Hallmark Hall of Fame following Macbeth and The Cradle Song. She had performed in the play the year before in New York and received poor reviews but insisted the production was faulty rather than the play itself. Charlton Heston agreed to co star.
