= Macbeth (1954 film) =

1954 live television adaptation by George Schaefer

- Based on: Macbeth by William Shakespeare
- Directed by: George Schaefer
- Starring: Maurice Evans; Judith Anderson
- Music by: Lehman Engel

Original release
- Release: November 28, 1954

Macbeth is a live television adaptation of the William Shakespeare play presented as the November 28, 1954 episode of the American anthology series Hallmark Hall of Fame. Directed by George Schaefer, and starring Maurice Evans and Dame Judith Anderson, the production was telecast in color, but has only been preserved on black-and-white kinescope.

In 1960, Evans and Anderson starred in a filmed made-for-television production of the play, also directed by Schaefer for the Hallmark Hall of Fame, but with an entirely different supporting cast. That production was filmed in color on location in Scotland, and was released theatrically in Europe.

== Cast ==
- Maurice Evans as Macbeth
- Judith Anderson as Lady Macbeth
- Jane Rose as First Witch
- Frieda Altman as Second Witch
- Maud Sheerer as Third Witch
- House Jameson as Duncan
- Roger Hamilton as Malcolm
- William Woodson as the Sergeant
- Guy Sorel as Ross
- Staats Cotsworth as Banquo
- Michael Kane as Angus
- Basil Langton as Seyton
- John Reese as Fleance
- J. Pat O'Malley as the Porter (credited as Pat O'Malley)
- Richard Waring as Macduff
- Peter Fernandez as Donaldbain [sic]
- Noel Leslie as the Doctor
- George Ebeling as First Murderer
- Robert Carricart as Second Murderer
- Ford Rainey as Menteith
- Margot Stevenson as Lady Macduff
- Rhoden Streeter as Young Macduff
- Nan McFarland as Gentlewoman
- Edwin Jerome as Caithness
- Val Wrenne as the Servant
- Roy Dean as the Messenger
