= Macbeth (1960 American film) =

1960 television film by George Schaefer

- Based on: Macbeth by William Shakespeare
- Written by: Anthony Squire
- Directed by: George Schaefer
- Starring: Maurice Evans; Judith Anderson
- Music by: Richard Addinsell

Production
- Producers: Phil C. Samuel; George Schaefer
- Cinematography: F. A. Young
- Editor: Ralph Kemplen

Original release
- Network: NBC
- Release: November 20, 1960

Macbeth is a 1960 television film adaptation of the William Shakespeare play presented as the November 20, 1960 episode of the American anthology series Hallmark Hall of Fame. The series' second production of the play was, like the 1954 live telecast, also directed by George Schaefer, and again starred English-born American actor Maurice Evans and Australian actress Judith Anderson. The supporting cast, however, was different, consisting entirely of British actors, and was filmed on location in Scotland; the 1954 version had used a mostly American cast.

== Production ==
Filmed in color, the program was described in a contemporary publication as the "[m]ost expensive TV show of all time, costing $1,200,000."

Internationally, this version was treated as a feature film, and was released theatrically in Europe. It was entered into the 11th Berlin International Film Festival.

This television film won five Primetime Emmy Awards at the 13th annual award ceremony, held in 1961.

== Principal cast ==
- Maurice Evans – Macbeth
- Judith Anderson – Lady Macbeth
- Michael Hordern – Banquo
- Ian Bannen – Macduff
- Malcolm Keen - King Duncan

== Primetime Emmy Awards ==
At the 13th Primetime Emmy Awards ceremony, the top show of the night was the NBC anthology Hallmark Hall of Fame for this production of Macbeth. It won in all of its nominated categories, tying the record (since broken) of five major awards.

- Outstanding Program Achievement in the Field of Drama
- The Program of the Year
- Outstanding Single Performance by an Actor in a Leading Role (Maurice Evans)
- Outstanding Single Performance by an Actress in a Leading Role (Judith Anderson)
- Outstanding Directorial Achievement in Drama (George Schaefer)

== See also ==
- 13th Primetime Emmy Awards
