= Hallmark Hall of Fame =

American television anthology series

- Genre: Anthology
- Written by: Robert Hartung; Jean Holloway; Helene Hanff; Gian Carlo Menotti
- Directed by: George Schaefer; William Corrigan; Albert McCleery; Kirk Browning; Fielder Cook; Jeannot Szwarc; John Erman
- Composers: Gian Carlo Menotti; Bernard Green; Richard Addinsell; Jerry Goldsmith; Bruce Broughton; Morton Stevens; John Kander; Ed Shearmur; Marvin Hamlisch
- Country of origin: United States
- Original language: English
- No. of seasons: 69
- No. of episodes: 260 (list of episodes)

Production
- Executive producers: George Schaefer; Brent Shields
- Producers: Maurice Evans; Samuel Chotzinoff; Phil C. Samuel; Robert Hartung
- Cinematography: Freddie Young
- Editors: Henry Batista; Robert L. Swanson; Sam Gold (editor); Richard K. Brockway
- Running time: 30–150 minutes
- Production companies: Hallmark Hall of Fame Productions (1951–2016); Crown Media Productions (2016–present)

Original release
- Network: NBC (1951–1992); CBS (1973–80, 1982–89, 1990–2011); PBS (1981); ABC (1989–95, 2011–14); Hallmark Channel (2014–present)
- Release: December 24, 1951 – present

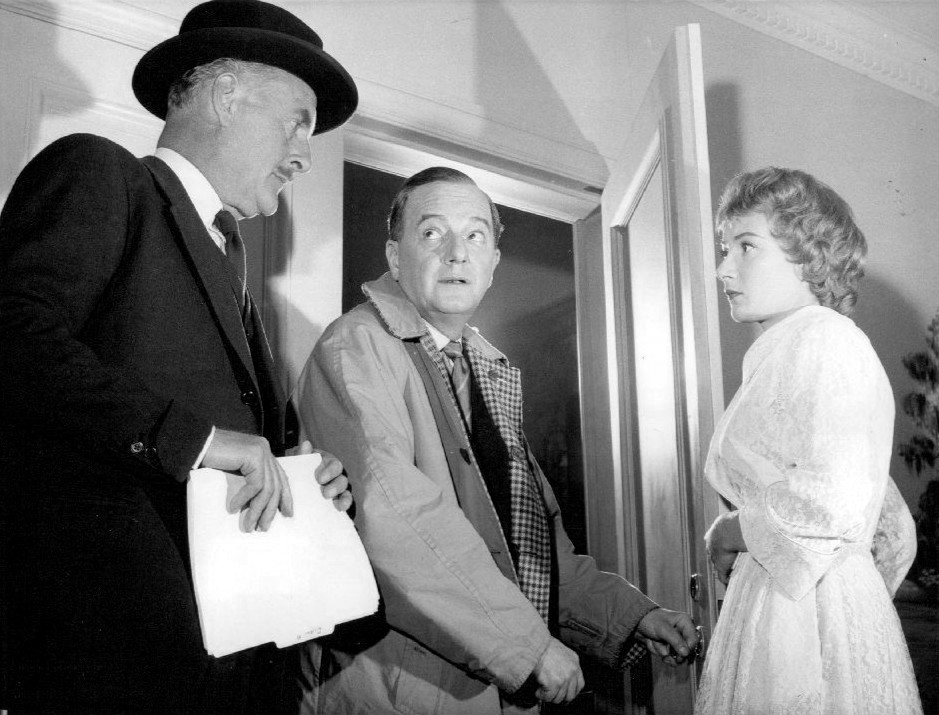
A production of Dial M for Murder, L–R: John Williams, Maurice Evans, and Rosemary Harris (1958)

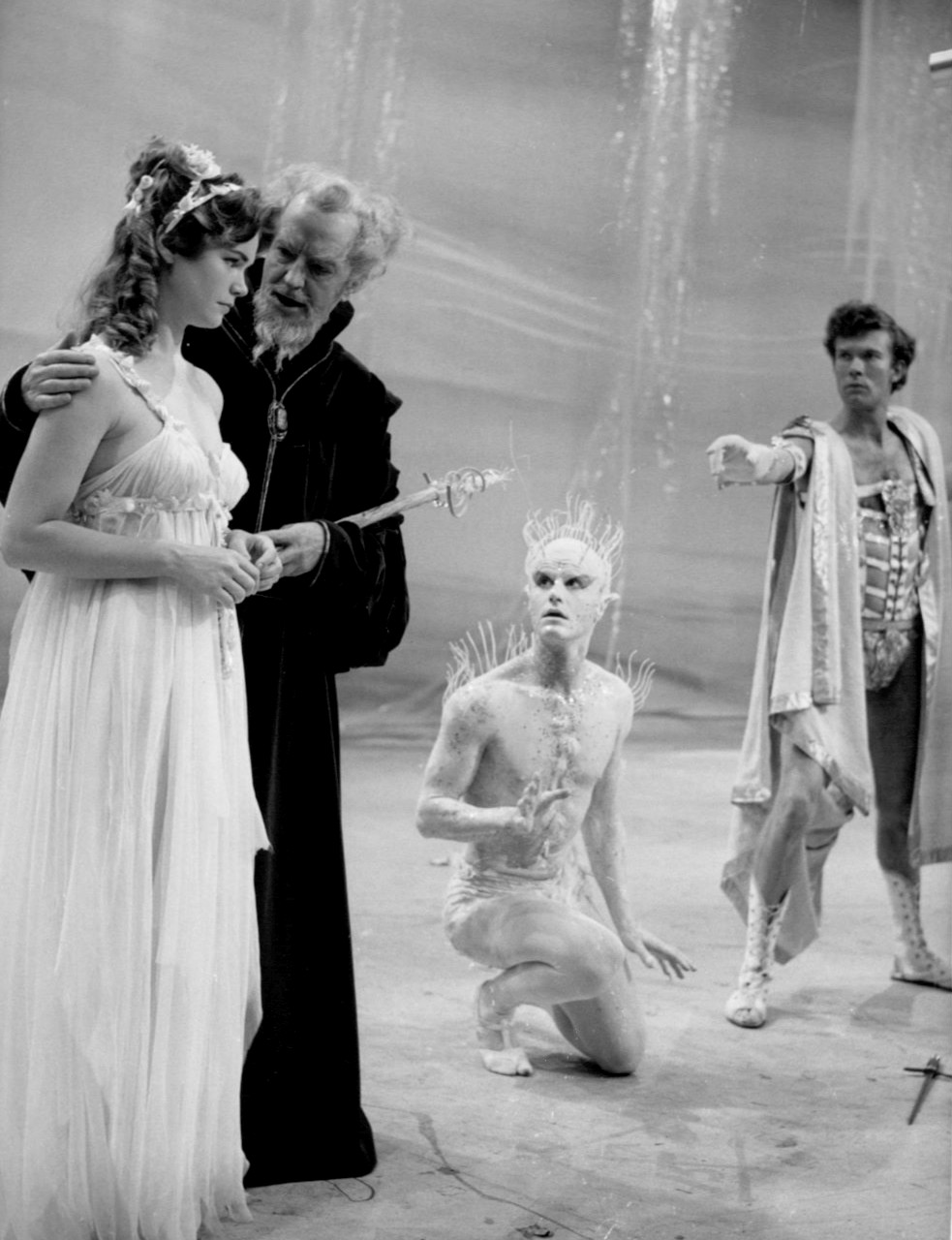
A production of The Tempest, L–R: Lee Remick, Maurice Evans, Roddy McDowall and William Bassett (1960)

Hallmark Hall of Fame, originally called Hallmark Television Playhouse, is an American anthology television series sponsored by Hallmark Cards, a Kansas City–based greeting card company. It is the longest-running primetime series in the history of television; it began airing in 1951 and aired on network television until 2014, with episodes largely limited to one film in a span of several months since the 1980s. Since 1954, all of its productions have been broadcast in color. It was one of the first video productions to telecast in color, a rarity in the 1950s. Many television films have been shown on the program since its debut, though the program began with live telecasts of dramas and then changed to videotaped productions before finally changing to filmed ones.

The series has received 81 Emmy Awards, dozens of Christopher and Peabody Awards, nine Golden Globes, and Humanitas Prizes. Once a common practice during the formative years of American television, it is one of the last remaining television programs where the title includes the name of its sponsor. Unlike other long-running TV series still on the air, it differs in that it broadcasts only occasionally and not on a weekly broadcast programming schedule.

The Hall of Fame films are made with production values and a budget that is comparable to that of a feature film.

== History ==
=== Early years ===
The series is the direct descendant of two old-time radio dramatic anthologies sponsored previously by Hallmark: Radio Reader's Digest, adapting stories from the popular magazine (though the magazine never sponsored the show); and its successor, Hallmark Playhouse, which premiered on CBS in 1948. The Hallmark Playhouse changed to more serious literature from all genres.

Hallmark Television Playhouse debuted on December 24, 1951, on the NBC television network, with the first opera written specifically for television, Amahl and the Night Visitors, featuring the ballet dancer Nicholas Magallanes. Playhouse was hosted by Sarah Churchill and was a weekly half-hour program. In 1953, the series was renamed Hallmark Hall of Fame. It was the first time a major corporation developed a television project specifically as a means of promoting its products to the viewing public. The program was such a success that it was restaged by Hallmark several times during a period of fifteen years. Amahl was also staged by other NBC television anthologies. Under the supervision of creative executives at its advertising agency Foote, Cone, and Belding in Chicago, Hallmark also transformed its radio Hallmark Playhouse into a Hallmark Hall of Fame format—this time, featuring stories of pioneers of all types in America—from 1953 through 1955.

Early productions included some of the classical works of Shakespeare: Hamlet, Richard II, The Taming of the Shrew, Macbeth, Twelfth Night, and The Tempest. Biographical subjects were very eclectic, ranging from Florence Nightingale to Father Flanagan to Joan of Arc. Popular Broadway plays such as Harvey, Dial M for Murder, and Kiss Me, Kate were made available to a mass audience, most of them with casts that had not appeared in the film versions released to theatres. In a few cases, the actors repeated their original Broadway roles. Actors such as Richard Burton, Alfred Lunt, Lynn Fontanne, Maurice Evans, Katharine Cornell, Julie Harris, Laurence Olivier and Peter Ustinov all made what were then extremely rare television appearances in these plays.

Two different productions of Hamlet have been broadcast on Hallmark Hall of Fame, one featuring Maurice Evans (1953) and the other a British one featuring Richard Chamberlain (1970). Neither version was more than two hours long. Evans and actress Judith Anderson repeated their famous stage performances of Macbeth on the Hallmark Hall of Fame on two separate occasions, each time with a different supporting cast. The first version in 1954 was telecast live from NBC's Brooklyn color studio, while the second in 1960 was filmed on location in Scotland and released to cinemas in Europe after its American telecast. The Richard Chamberlain version of Hamlet, which was also telecast in Britain on ITV Sunday Night Theatre, won five Emmys when telecast on the Hallmark Hall of Fame, out of a total of thirteen nominations. It may have set a record for the most-nominated Shakespeare production to ever be televised.

In 1955, Hallmark Hall of Fame switched its format to a special series seen only four to eight times a year around greeting card holidays and in 90-minute or 120-minute length. Starting in 1970, the frequency dropped to two to three times a year. The source material were plays and novels from major authors, and were produced with stage actors and actresses.

Hamlet, Macbeth, and the other Shakespeare plays presented on Hallmark Hall of Fame were cut (sometimes drastically) to fit the time limits of a standard film or of the Hallmark Hall of Fame itself, which, during the 1950s, 1960s and 1970s, never ran longer than two hours and frequently even less. It was left to National Educational Television (NET) and its successor, the Public Broadcasting Service (PBS) to be the pioneers in presenting nearly complete Shakespeare productions on American television.

As a result of Foote, Cone, and Belding advertising executive and producer Duane C. Bogie's influence, Hallmark Hall of Fame began to offer original material, such as Aunt Mary (1979) and Thursday's Child (1983), although its lineup still primarily consisted of expensive-looking Masterpiece Theatre-style adaptations of American and European literary classics, such as John Steinbeck's The Winter of Our Discontent (1983), Robert Louis Stevenson's The Master of Ballantrae (1984), and Charles Dickens's A Tale of Two Cities (1980), Oliver Twist (1982), and A Christmas Carol (1984). A Tale of Two Cities was the first Hallmark production (and to date, one of the very few) to run three hours. The late 1980s featured productions such as Foxfire (1987), My Name Is Bill W. (1989), Sarah, Plain and Tall (1991), O Pioneers! (1992), To Dance with the White Dog (1993), The Piano Lesson (1995), and What the Deaf Man Heard (1997). One installment, Promise (1986), featuring James Garner and James Woods, won five Emmys, two Golden Globes, a Peabody award, a Humanitas Prize, and a Christopher Award.

=== Post-NBC ===
For nearly three decades, the series was broadcast by NBC, but the network ended its association with the series in 1979 due to declining ratings. Since then, the series has been televised by CBS from 1979 to 1989 (except for briefly on PBS in 1981), then on ABC from 1989 to 1994.

Through the 1980s and 1990s, Hallmark Hall of Fame movies often had twice the budget of other network movies. Hallmark movies also ran (in some cases) approximately 10–15 minutes longer (or up to 110 minutes minus commercials) because Hallmark Cards fully sponsored the movies and had fewer commercial breaks. Unlike most network movies of the period, Hallmark always filmed on location, and usually filmed for 24 days, compared to 18–20 days for most other TV movies.

Richard Welsh Company was retained in 1982 to work on developing Hall of Fame projects. Brad Moore was placed in charge of Hallmark Hall of Fame in 1983.

In February 1992, Hallmark Cards had formed Signboard Hill Productions as sister production company, leveraging HHOFP management and expertise to produce some Hall of Fame movies.

CBS picked up the series again in 1994. It ran three movies a year over 16 years, until 2011, when it ended its association with the series. The final film was Beyond the Blackboard, on April 24, 2011.

On November 27, 2011, Hallmark Hall of Fame returned to ABC with Have a Little Faith, which debuted to very low ratings. The total number of viewers was estimated at 6.5 million, compared to 13.5 million for the Hallmark Hall of Fame presentation of November Christmas on the weekend after Thanksgiving in 2010. Encore broadcasts of these ABC episodes aired on Hallmark Channel a week after their initial broadcast on ABC. The films were also available for streaming on the website Feeln.com a few days after airing.

In September 2014, it was announced that Hallmark Hall of Fame would air exclusively on the Hallmark Channel for the foreseeable future, ending the program's 63-year run on broadcast television. The first episode to premiere on Hallmark Channel was One Christmas Eve, starring Anne Heche. On the cable channel, four original movies at most would air as a part of the Hall of Fame with multiple encores. The HHOF library would also be available.

In February 2016, Hallmark Cards, which had been directly involved in the production of Hall of Fame from its inception, transferred management of the series division to its subsidiary Crown Media Productions. Hallmark Cards continued to sponsor the program and oversees the creation of films.

== Episodes ==
Copies of the episode "Richard II" (January 24, 1954), starring Evans, were made available to colleges and schools. In April 1954, Edgar Sisson, director of NBC Films, announced that 16 mm copies of kinescope recordings of the broadcast would be made for educational use. Only a small number of Hallmark Hall of Fame episodes have been released on VHS and DVD. The 1960 production of The Tempest and the 1966 production of Lamp at Midnight were released as VHS tapes by Films for the Humanities; they have not been released in DVD format.

The Hallmark Hall of Fame division does not own most of the films from the series from 1951 to the 1970s, as the rights to those films were retained by the producers and/or directors involved, with Warner Bros. owning the rights to Promise and My Name is Bill W. Hallmark Channel has sought to reclaim rights to these films with the exception of Promise and My Name is Bill W.

== Hallmark Hall of Fame Productions ==
Hallmark Hall of Fame Productions LLC (HHOFP) is a television film production company that produces films for Hallmark Hall of Fame Productions, and is owned by Crown Media Productions.

Hallmark Hall of Fame Productions' first credited film was an adaptation of The Tempest in 1960. Richard Welsh Company was retained in 1982 to work on developing HoF projects. Hallmark Hall of Fame Productions, Inc. was incorporated on September 27, 1994. In February 1992, Hallmark Cards had formed Signboard Hill Productions as sister production company, leveraging HHOFP management and expertise. The Hallmark Hall of Fame division, including production, was transferred to affiliate Crown Media Productions.

== See also ==
- List of Hallmark Channel Original Movies
- Walt Disney anthology television series
- World Masterpiece Theater
