= Maurice Evans (actor) =

English actor (1901–1989)

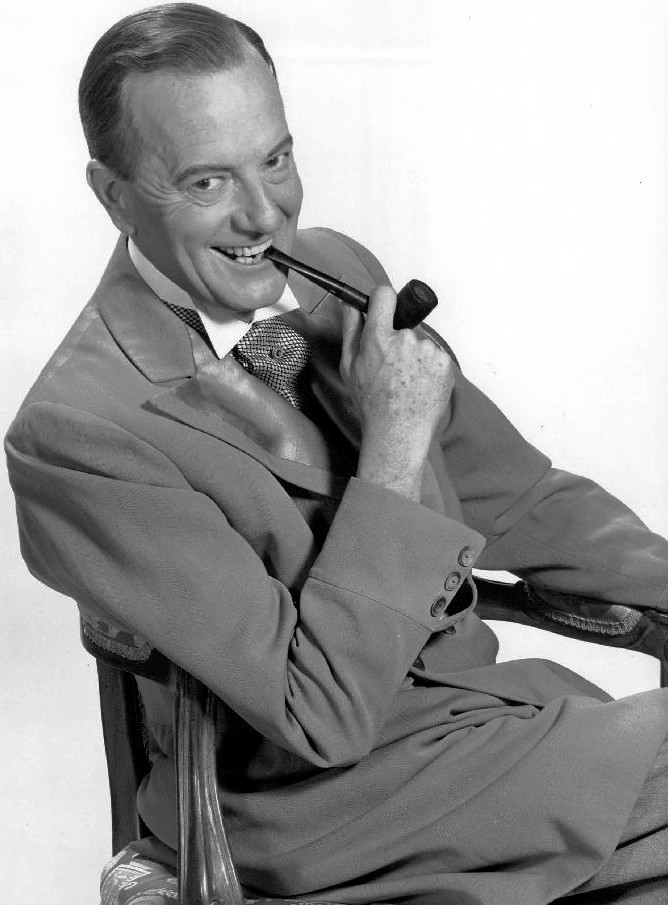
- Evans in 1956
- Born: Maurice Herbert Evans; 3 June 1901; Dorchester, Dorset, England
- Died: 12 March 1989 (aged 87); Rottingdean, East Sussex, England
- Occupations: Actor; producer
- Years active: 1926–1983

Maurice Herbert Evans (3 June 1901 – 12 March 1989) was an English actor, noted for his interpretations of Shakespearean characters. His best-known screen roles include Dr. Zaius in the 1968 film Planet of the Apes and Maurice on Bewitched.

== Early years ==
Evans was born at 28 Icen Way in Dorchester, Dorset. He was the son of Laura (Turner) and Alfred Herbert Evans, a Welsh dispensing chemist and keen amateur actor who made adaptations of novels by Thomas Hardy for the local amateur company. Young Maurice made his first stage appearance as a small boy in Under the Greenwood Tree. Not long after, the Evans family moved to London.

He first appeared on the stage in 1926 at the Cambridge Festival Theatre and joined the Old Vic Company in 1934, playing Hamlet, Richard II, and Iago. He was selected by Terence Gray to appear in the opening production in November 1926 at the Festival Theatre, taking the role of Orestes in two parts of the sensational production of the Oresteia of Aeschylus. This was followed by Lord Belvoir in The Man Who Ate the Popomack by W. J. Turner, and Saint Anthony in Maeterlinck's The Miracle of Saint Anthony.

In 1927, Evans played a poet in The Pleasure Garden by Beatrice Mayor followed by Young Man in On Baile's Strand by W. B. Yeats, Midir in The Immortal Hour by Fiona Macleod, the Hon. Algernon Moodie in The Rumour by C.K. Munro, Mark Ingestire in Sweeney Todd by Dibdin Pitt, the poet in The Lost Silk Hat by Lord Dunsany, the Captain in Androcles and the Lion by George Bernard Shaw, Mister Four and Young Man in The Adding Machine by Elmer Rice, Don Juan in the play of the same title by James Elroy Flecker, two parts in Terence Gray's own play The Red Nights of the Tcheka, the Stage Manager in The Player Queen (also by Yeats), the Second Engineer in The Insect Play by the Čapek brothers, Prince Kamose in another Gray play called And in the Tomb, and finally in June 1927, Don Pelegari in Pirandello's Each In His Own Way. Both Yeats and Shaw attended performances of their own plays.

== Career ==
In 1928, Evans was one of a group of out-of-work actors including Laurence Olivier, chosen to perform in a "tryout" of R. C. Sherriff's Journey's End directed by James Whale at the Apollo Theatre in London, and later in 1929 at the Savoy Theatre which had been leased by the Chicago theatre manager Maurice Browne. It was a huge success, running for two years and making Evans's name. He played the young officer Raleigh. In 1934, he went to the Old Vic Theatre where his interpretation of Shakespeare's Richard II was praised and led to an invitation to join Katharine Cornell in the United States. His first appearance on Broadway was opposite Cornell in Romeo and Juliet in 1936. A later production of Richard II was the surprise success of the 1937 theatre season. Evans went on to play Hamlet (1938), Falstaff in Henry IV, Part 1 (1939), Macbeth (1941), and Malvolio in Twelfth Night (1942) opposite the Viola of Helen Hayes, under the direction of Margaret Webster. He also starred opposite Cornell in the 1935 production of George Bernard Shaw's St. Joan.

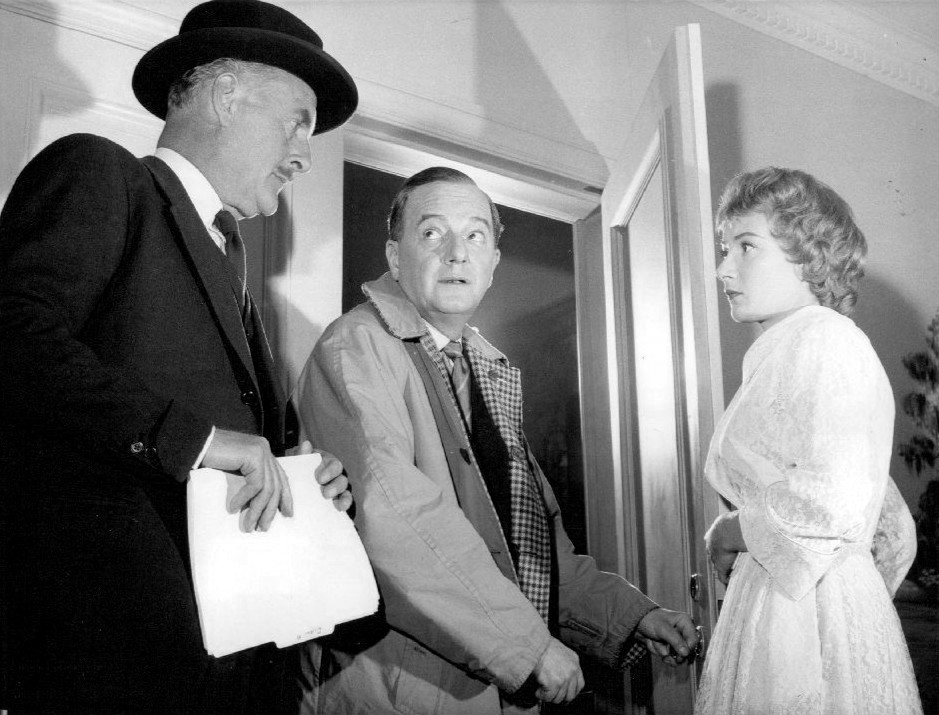
Evans reprised his Broadway role in Dial M for Murder for a 1958 Hallmark Hall of Fame television presentation. Also pictured are John Williams and Rosemary Harris.

When the U.S. entered the Second World War, he enlisted in the United States Army and he later was in charge of an Army Entertainment Section in the Central Pacific. He arranged for the transfer of Carl Reiner from the Signal Corps to the entertainment unit in Hawaii, where Evans was his commanding officer. The unit produced dozens of shows for the troops in the Pacific. Reiner later hired Evans for the part of Hobart the butler in The Jerk, as Evans's agent had indicated that the part would enable Evans to maintain his union benefits.

Evans produced his famous "G.I. version" of Hamlet that cut the text of the play to make the title character more appealing to the troops, an interpretation so popular that he later took it to Broadway in 1945. Evans rose to the rank of Major by the end of the war. He shifted his attention to the works of Shaw, notably as John Tanner in Man and Superman and as King Magnus in The Apple Cart. In 1952, he starred as the murderous husband in the original Broadway stage production of Dial M for Murder. He also successfully produced Broadway productions in which he did not appear, notably The Teahouse of the August Moon.

In 1956, Evans recorded an LP of stories from Winnie-the-Pooh. American television audiences of the 1960s will remember Evans as Samantha's father, Maurice, on the sitcom Bewitched. His real-life insistence that his first name be pronounced "Morris" was ironically at odds with his Bewitched character's contrasting stance that it be pronounced "Maw-REESE". Evans also appeared in the fourth season of Daniel Boone starring Fess Parker playing a French impresario "Beaumarchais". He also played The Puzzler on Batman in a double episode storyline (which was common for that series) in December 1966. Continuing his American TV appearances, he guest starred in The Big Valley from the latter part of the fourth and final season of that western series in April 1969, an episode entitled "Danger Road".

Evans had great impact on the big screen as well. He played a diabolical villain in Kind Lady (1951; co-starring Ethel Barrymore, Keenan Wynn, and Angela Lansbury); Emperor Antoninus in Androcles and the Lion (1952); and Sir Arthur Sullivan in The Story of Gilbert and Sullivan (1953). Evans appeared memorably in two 1968 films: as the evolved orangutan, Dr. Zaius in Planet of the Apes (and the 1970 sequel Beneath the Planet of the Apes) and as the doomed "Hutch" in the thriller Rosemary's Baby, who attempts to warn the title character of the true nature of her Satanic neighbours.

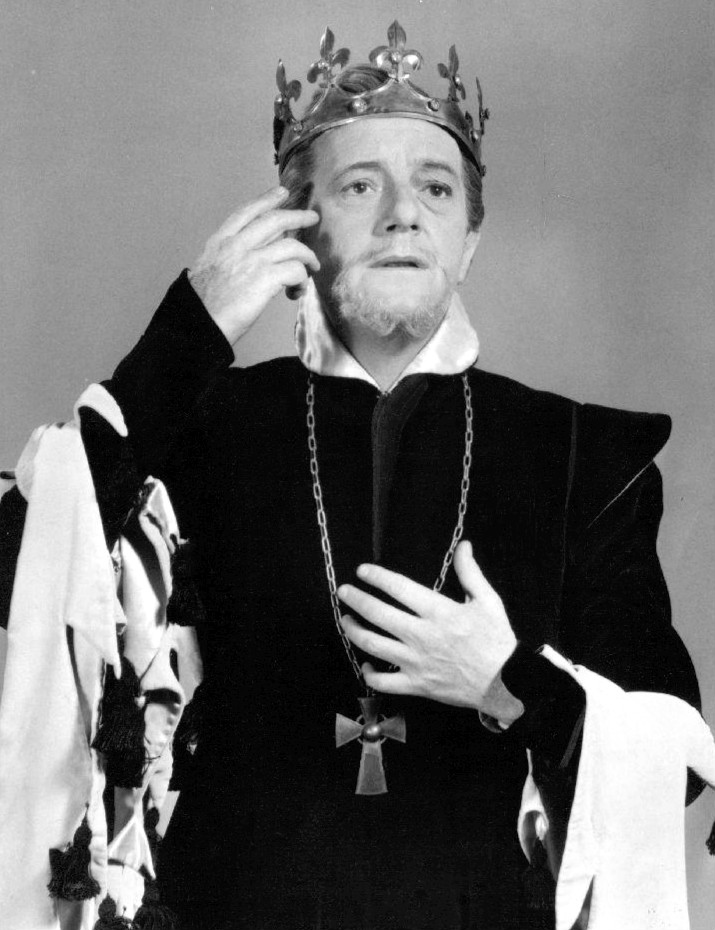
Evans as Richard II

Evans appeared in more American television productions of Shakespeare than any other actor. Beginning in 1953, for the famous television anthology, Hallmark Hall of Fame, he starred in the first feature-length (i.e., longer than an hour) dramatisations of the plays to be presented on American television. They were:

- Hamlet
- Macbeth twice – both times appearing with Dame Judith Anderson who won an Emmy for both of her television performances as Lady Macbeth. Evans won an Emmy Award for the latter, 1960 production. The earlier, a live telecast, was in 1954)
- Richard II
- Twelfth Night (as Malvolio)
- The Taming of the Shrew (as Petruchio, opposite Lilli Palmer as Katherine)
- The Tempest (as Prospero)

In bringing so much Shakespeare to American television in such a short span of time (between 1953 and 1960), Evans was a true pioneer. This had never been tried before – at least, not in the U.S. He firmly believed that it was an actor's job to "lead public taste, not to play to public taste".

Evans brought his Shakespeare productions to Broadway many times, playing Hamlet on the Great White Way in four separate productions for a record grand total of 283 performances. He and Dame Judith Anderson starred on Broadway several times in Macbeth. Their performances were widely regarded as the definitive portrayals of these characters, although one notable dissenter was Orson Welles, who stated that Evans, as an actor, was "worse than bad – he was poor."

Evans appeared on Broadway as Hamlet four times, but the productions of the play that he appeared in were consecutive revivals of it – no other actor played Hamlet on Broadway between 1938, when Evans first played him there, and 1946, which marked Evans's last Broadway Hamlet.

== Personal life ==
Although he took U.S. citizenship in 1941, Evans returned to Britain by the end of the 1960s. Aside from an infrequent trip to the United States and occasional visits to retired actors in financial need—as a representative of the Actors' Fund, of which he was a longtime trustee—he lived quietly near Brighton. He never married and was survived by a brother, Hugh, of London.

== Publication ==
- All This and Evans Too, memoir, University of South Carolina Press, 1987; ISBN 978-0872494961

== Death ==
Evans died, aged 87, in a nursing home in Rottingdean, East Sussex, England.

== Partial filmography ==
- White Cargo (1929) – Langford
- Raise the Roof (1930) – Rodney Langford
- Should a Doctor Tell? (1930) – Roger Smith
- Wedding Rehearsal (1932) – George Thompson aka Tootles
- Marry Me (1932) – Paul Hart
- The Only Girl (1933) – Didier
- The Path of Glory (1934) – Anton Maroni
- Bypass to Happiness (1934) – Robin
- Checkmate (1935) – Phillip Allen
- Scrooge (1935) – Poor man
- Kind Lady (1951) – Henry Springer Elcott
- Androcles and the Lion (1952) – Emperor Antoninus (Caesar)
- The Story of Gilbert and Sullivan (1953) – Arthur Sullivan
- Bewitched (TV series, 1964–1971) – Maurice
- The War Lord (1965) – Priest
- One of Our Spies Is Missing (1966) – Sir Norman Swickert
- Batman episodes "The Puzzles are Coming" and "The Duo Is Slumming" (1966) – The Puzzler
- Traitors of San Angel (1967) – James Keefe
- Jack of Diamonds (1967) – Nicolai Vodkine
- Planet of the Apes (1968) – Dr. Zaius
- Rosemary's Baby (1968) – Hutch
- The Big Valley (TV Series) Season 4 Episode 24: "Dangerous Road" (1969) – Mr. Hewitt
- The Body Stealers (1969) – Dr. Matthews
- Operation Heartbeat (1969)
- Beneath the Planet of the Apes (1970) – Dr. Zaius
- Terror in the Wax Museum (1973) – Inspector Daniels
- Columbo: Forgotten Lady (TV series, 1975) – Raymond
- The Jerk (1979) – Hobart
- A Caribbean Mystery, Agatha Christie (1983) - Major Geoffrey Palgrave

== Selected stage credits ==
- Sea Fever (1931), New Theatre
