= Judith Anderson =

Australian actress (1897–1992)

Dame Judith Anderson AC DBE
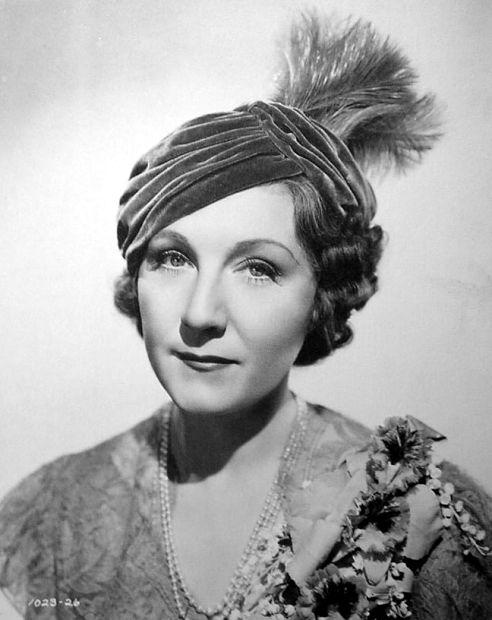
- Anderson in the 1920s
- Born: Frances Margaret Anderson; 10 February 1897; Adelaide, Colony of South Australia
- Died: 3 January 1992 (aged 94); Santa Barbara, California, U.S.
- Occupation: Actress
- Years active: 1915–1987
- Spouses: Benjamin Harrison Lehmann (m. 1937; div. 1939) Luther Greene (m. 1946; div. 1951)

Dame Frances Margaret Anderson (10 February 1897 – 3 January 1992), known professionally as Judith Anderson, was an Australian actress who had a successful career in stage, film, and television.

A well-known stage actress in her era, she won two Emmy Awards and a Tony Award, and was also nominated for a Grammy Award and an Academy Award.

== Early life ==
Frances Margaret Anderson was born in 1897 in Adelaide, South Australia, the youngest of four children born to Jessie Margaret (née Saltmarsh; 19 October 1862 – 24 November 1950), a former nurse, and Scottish-born James Anderson Anderson, a sharebroker and pioneering prospector.

She attended a private school, Norwood, where her education ended before graduation.

== Career ==
=== Early acting ===
She made her professional debut (as Francee Anderson) in 1915, playing Stephanie at the Theatre Royal, Sydney, in A Royal Divorce. Leading the company was Scottish actor Julius Knight, whom she later credited with laying the foundations of her acting skills. She appeared alongside him in adaptations of The Scarlet Pimpernel, The Three Musketeers, Monsieur Beaucaire, and David Garrick. In 1917, she toured New Zealand.

=== Early years in America ===
Anderson was ambitious and wanted to leave Australia. Most local actors went to London, but the war made this difficult, so she decided on the U.S. She travelled to California, but was unsuccessful for four months, then moved to New York, with an equal lack of success.

After a period of poverty and illness, she found work with the Emma Bunting Stock Company at the Fourteenth Street Theatre in 1918–19. She then toured with other stock companies.

=== Broadway and film ===
She made her Broadway debut in Up the Stairs (1922) followed by The Crooked Square (1923), and she went to Chicago with Patches (1923). She appeared in Peter Weston (1923), which only had a short run.

One year later, she had changed her acting forename (albeit not for legal purposes) to Judith and had her first triumph with the play Cobra (1924) co-starring Louis Calhern, which ran for 35 performances. Anderson then went on to The Dove (1925), which went on for 101 performances and really established her on Broadway.

She toured Australia in 1927 with three plays: Tea for Three, The Green Hat, and Cobra. Back on Broadway, she was in Behold the Bridegroom (1927–28) by George Kelly, and had the lead role in Anna (1928). She replaced Lynn Fontanne during the successful run of Strange Interlude (1929).

Anderson made her film debut in a short for Warner Bros., "Madame of the Jury" (1930). She made her feature-film debut with a role in Blood Money (1933).

In 1931, she played the Unknown Woman in the American premiere of Pirandello's As You Desire Me, which ran for 142 performances. (It was filmed the following year with Greta Garbo in the same role.) She was in a short-lived revival of Mourning Becomes Electra (1932), then did Firebird (1932), Conquest, The Drums Begin (both 1933), and The Mask and the Face (1933, with Humphrey Bogart). Anderson then focused on Broadway with Come of Age (1934) and Divided By Three (1934).

=== Broadway star ===
She had a big hit as the lead in Zoe Akins' The Old Maid (1935) from the novel by Edith Wharton, in the role later played on film by Miriam Hopkins. It ran for 305 performances.

In 1936, Anderson played Gertrude to John Gielgud's Hamlet in a production that featured Lillian Gish as Ophelia. In 1937, she joined the Old Vic Company in London and played Lady Macbeth opposite Laurence Olivier in a production by Michel Saint-Denis, at the Old Vic and the New Theatre.

She returned to Broadway with Family Portrait (1939), which she adored, but it only had a short run. She later toured in the show.

=== Rebecca ===
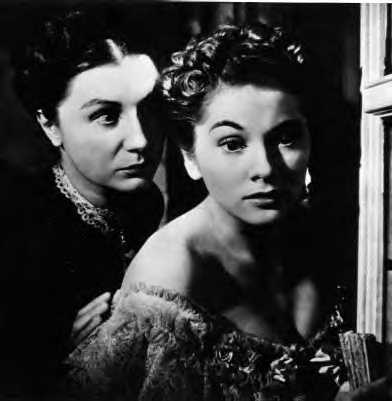
Anderson (left) as Mrs. Danvers terrorizes the second Mrs. de Winter, played by Joan Fontaine (right) in a still from Rebecca.

Anderson received a career boost when she was cast in Alfred Hitchcock's Rebecca (1940). As the housekeeper Mrs. Danvers, she mentally tormented the young bride, the "second Mrs. de Winter" (Joan Fontaine), even encouraging her to commit suicide; and taunted Maxim de Winter (Laurence Olivier) with the memory of his first wife, the never-seen "Rebecca" of the title. The film was a huge critical and commercial success, and Anderson was nominated for Best Supporting Actress at the 13th Academy Awards.

=== 1940s ===
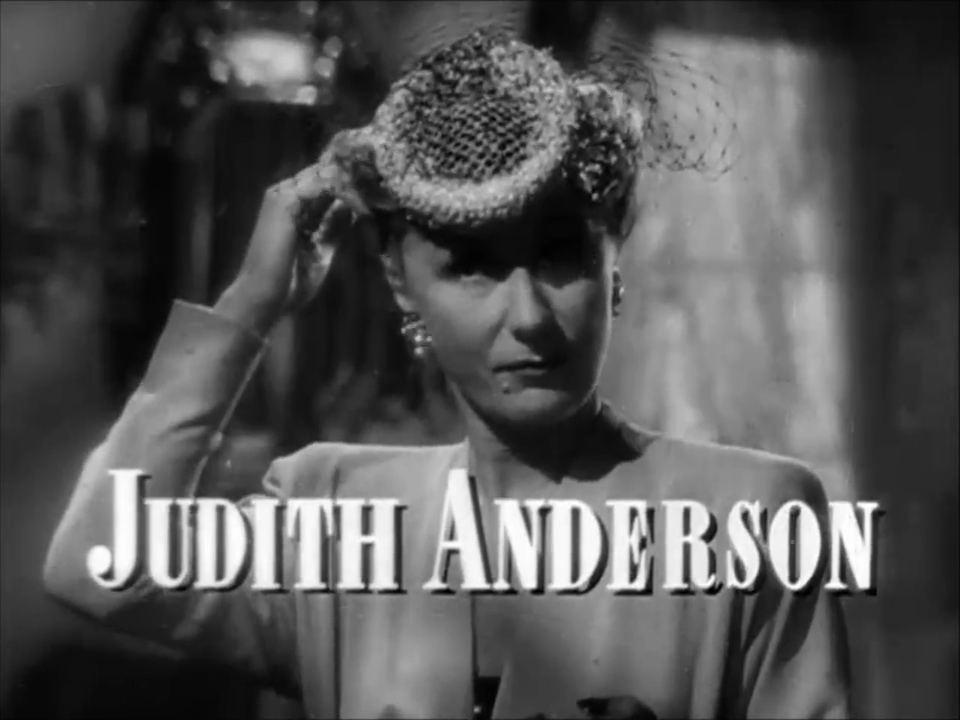
From the trailer for the film Laura (1944)

Anderson was second billed in an Eddie Cantor comedy, Forty Little Mothers (1940) at MGM. She stayed at that studio for Free and Easy (1941), then went over to RKO to play the title role in Lady Scarface (1941).

In 1941, she played Lady Macbeth again in New York City opposite Maurice Evans in a production staged by Margaret Webster, a role she was to reprise with Evans on television, firstly in 1954 and then again in 1960 (the second version was released as a feature film in Europe). This ran for 131 performances.

Anderson made her appearance in Robinson Jeffers' The Tower Beyond Tragedy at the outdoor Forest Theater in Carmel-by-the-Sea, California, on July 2–5, 1941. This was the first time it played in a professional manner. John Burr's Carmel Pine Cone review admired Anderson's performance and proclaimed the production was “an unqualified success." Director Charles O'Neal persuaded Anderson to appear in both The Tower Beyond Tragedy and the Family Portrait.

She returned to films to make four movies at Warner Bros.: All Through the Night and Kings Row (both 1942), and Edge of Darkness and Stage Door Canteen (both 1943).

In 1942–43, on stage she played Olga in Chekhov's Three Sisters, in a production, which also featured Katharine Cornell, Ruth Gordon, Edmund Gwenn, Dennis King, and Alexander Knox. (Kirk Douglas, playing an orderly, made his Broadway debut in the production.) It ran for 123 performances. The production was so illustrious, it was featured on the cover of Time.

Anderson returned to Hollywood to appear in Laura (1944). She briefly returned to Australia to tour American army camps. She was back in Hollywood to appear in And Then There Were None (1945), The Diary of a Chambermaid (1946), and The Strange Love of Martha Ivers (1946). Anderson had rare top billing in Specter of the Rose (1946), written and directed by Ben Hecht. She returned to support roles for Pursued (1947), The Red House (1947), and Tycoon (1947).

=== Medea ===
In 1947, she triumphed as Medea in a version of Euripides' eponymous tragedy, written by poet Robinson Jeffers and produced by John Gielgud, who played Jason. She was a friend of Jeffers and a frequent visitor to his home Tor House in Carmel. She won the Tony Award for Best Actress for her performance. The show ran for 214 performances. Anderson then toured throughout the country with it.

=== 1950s ===
On the big screen, Anderson played a golddigger in Anthony Mann's Western The Furies (1950) and made her TV debut in a 1951 adaptation of The Silver Cord for Pulitzer Prize Playhouse. She guest-starred on TV shows such as The Billy Rose Show and Somerset Maugham TV Theatre.

She returned to Broadway with The Tower Beyond Tragedy by Jeffers (1950), and toured Medea in German in 1951. She was in a New York revival of Come of Age in 1952. She was Herodias in Salome (1953) and played in Black Chiffon on The Motorola Television Hour.

In 1953, she was directed by Charles Laughton in his own adaptation of Stephen Vincent Benét's John Brown's Body with a cast also featuring Raymond Massey and Tyrone Power. Then, she did In the Summer House (1953–54) on Broadway.

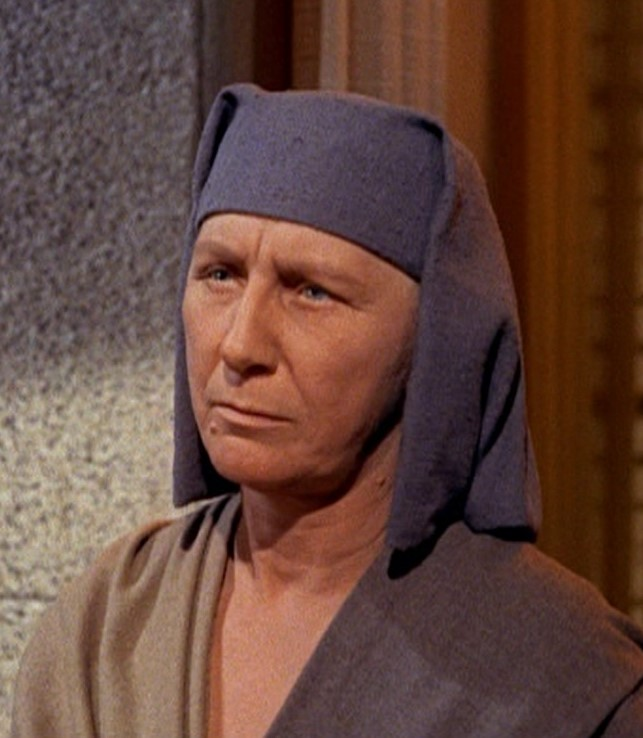
Anderson in the trailer for The Ten Commandments

On television, she was in Macbeth (1954) with Maurice Evans, for which she won an Emmy Award for Best Actress in a Single Performance, and The Elgin Hour. She was in several episodes of The Star and the Story and an episode of Climax! , as well as playing Memnet in Cecil B. DeMille's epic The Ten Commandments (1956).

In 1955, she toured Australia with Medea. In 1956, she was in a production of Caesar and Cleopatra for Producers' Showcase.

Anderson appeared in a 1958 adaptation of The Bridge of San Luis Rey for The DuPont Show of the Month and played the memorable role of Big Mama, alongside Burl Ives as Big Daddy, in the screen adaptation of Tennessee Williams's play, Cat on a Hot Tin Roof (1958). She followed it with a return to Broadway, in the short-lived Comes a Day by Speed Lampkin (1958). "I don't profess to know much about films", she said around this time. "I seldom see one."

Anderson reprised her performance as Medea for TV in 1959; in the same year, she appeared in a small-screen adaptation of The Moon and Sixpence with Laurence Olivier. Also in 1959 she played the title character in Wagon Train S3 E8 "The Felizia Kingdom Story", and appeared in several episodes of Playhouse 90 and one of Our American Heritage.

=== 1960s ===
In 1960, she played Madame Arkadina in Chekhov's The Seagull first at the Edinburgh Festival, and then at the Old Vic, with Tom Courtenay, Cyril Luckham and Tony Britton.

That year she also performed in Cradle Song and Macbeth (both 1960) for TV. She won The Emmy Award for Outstanding Single Performance by an Actress in a Leading Role, for once again playing Lady MacBeth. She had support roles in Cinderfella (1960) and Why Bother to Knock (1961).

In 1961, she toured an evening in which she performed Macbeth, Medea and Tower. Anderson was in The Ghost of Sierra de Cobre (1964) for TV.

In 1966, she did a performance on stage in Elizabeth the Queen, which received poor reviews.

She received acclaim for her lead performance in a TV version of Elizabeth the Queen (1968, with Charlton Heston). She followed it with The File on Devlin (1969) and A Man Called Horse (1970). The latter was her first feature since Why Bother to Knock.

In 1970, she realised a long-held ambition to play the title role of Hamlet on a national tour of the United States and at New York City's Carnegie Hall.

=== Spoken word and radio ===
Anderson also recorded many spoken-word record albums for Caedmon Audio from the 1950s to the 1970s, including scenes from Macbeth with Maurice Anderson (Victor, in 1941), an adaption of Medea, Robert Louis Stevenson verses, and readings from the Bible. She received a Grammy nomination for her work on the Wuthering Heights recording.

=== Return to Australia ===
Anderson returned briefly to Australia. She guest-starred in Matlock Police and was in the film Inn of the Damned (1974).

Her other credits that decade included The Borrowers (1973) and The Chinese Prime Minister (1974)

=== Later career ===
In 1982, she returned to Medea, this time playing the Nurse opposite Zoe Caldwell in the title role. Caldwell had appeared in a small role in the Australian tour of Medea in 1955–56. She was nominated for the Tony Award for Best Performance by a Featured Actress in a Play.

In 1984, she appeared in Star Trek III: The Search for Spock as the Vulcan High Priestess T'Lar.

That same year, she commenced a three-year stint as matriarch Minx Lockridge on the daytime NBC soap opera Santa Barbara elapsing from 1984 until 1987. When asked why, she replied "Why not? It's practically the same as doing a play." She had professed to be a fan of the daytime genre – she had watched General Hospital for 20 years – but after signing with Santa Barbara, she complained about her lack of screen time. The highlight of her stint was when Minx tearfully revealed the horrific truth that she had switched the late Channing Capwell with Brick Wallace as a baby, preventing her illegitimate grandson from being raised as a Capwell. This resulted in her receiving a Supporting Actress Emmy nomination although her screen time afterwards diminished to infrequent appearances. After leaving the series, she was succeeded in the role by the quarter-century younger American actress Janis Paige.

Her last movies were The Booth and Impure Thoughts (both 1985).

== Personal life ==
Anderson was married twice and declared that "neither experience was a jolly holiday":

- Benjamin Harrison Lehmann (1889–1977), an English professor at the University of California at Berkeley; they wed in 1937 and divorced in August 1939. By this marriage, she had a stepson, Benjamin Harrison Lehmann Jr. (born 1918).
- Luther Greene (1909–1987), a theatrical producer, and she were married in July 1946 and divorced in 1951.

== Death ==
Anderson spent much of her life in Santa Barbara, California, where she died of pneumonia in 1992, aged 94.

== Honours ==
Anderson was created a Dame Commander of the Order of the British Empire (DBE) in 1960 and thereafter was often billed as "Dame Judith Anderson".

On 10 June 1991, in the 1991 Australian Queen's Birthday Honours, she was appointed a Companion of the Order of Australia (AC), "in recognition of service to the performing arts".

== Filmography ==
=== Features ===
| Year | Title | Role | Notes |
|---|---|---|---|
| 1930 | Madame of the Jury | | Short |
| 1933 | Blood Money | Ruby Darling | |
| 1940 | Rebecca | Mrs. Danvers | |
| 1940 | Forty Little Mothers | Madame Madeleine Granville | |
| 1941 | Free and Easy | Lady Joan Culver | |
| 1941 | Lady Scarface | Slade | |
| 1942 | All Through the Night | Madame | |
| 1942 | Kings Row | Mrs. Harriet Gordon | |
| 1943 | Edge of Darkness | Gerd Bjarnesen | |
| 1943 | Stage Door Canteen | Judith Anderson | |
| 1944 | Laura | Ann Treadwell | |
| 1945 | And Then There Were None | Emily Brent | |
| 1946 | The Diary of a Chambermaid | Madame Lanlaire | |
| 1946 | The Strange Love of Martha Ivers | Mrs. Ivers | |
| 1946 | Specter of the Rose | Madame La Sylph | |
| 1947 | Pursued | Mrs. Callum | |
| 1947 | The Red House | Ellen Morgan | |
| 1947 | Tycoon | Miss Braithwaite | |
| 1950 | The Furies | Flo Burnett | |
| 1953 | Salome | Queen Herodias | |
| 1956 | The Ten Commandments | Memnet | |
| 1958 | Cat on a Hot Tin Roof | Big Momma Pollitt | |
| 1960 | Cinderfella | Wicked Stepmother | |
| 1961 | Don't Bother to Knock | Maggie Shoemaker | |
| 1970 | A Man Called Horse | Buffalo Cow Head | |
| 1975 | Inn of the Damned | Caroline Straulle | |
| 1984 | Star Trek III: The Search for Spock | T'Lar | |
| 1986 | Impure Thoughts | The Sister of Purgatory | |

=== Partial television credits ===
| Year | Title | Role | Notes |
|---|---|---|---|
| 1951 | Pulitzer Prize Playhouse | Mrs. Phelps | Episode: "The Silver Cord" |
| 1954 | Macbeth | Lady Macbeth | TV movie |
| 1954 | The Motorola Television Hour | Alicia | Episode: "Black Chiffon" |
| 1958 | The DuPont Show of the Month | Marchioness of Montemayor | Episode: "The Bridge of San Luis Rey" |
| 1959 | Wagon Train | Felizia Kingdom | Episode: "The Felizia Kingdom Story" |
| 1959 | The Moon and Sixpence | Tiare | TV movie |
| 1959 | A Christmas Festival | Narrator of the final offering | TV movie |
| 1960 | Cradle Song | The Prioress | TV movie |
| 1960 | Macbeth | Lady Macbeth | TV movie |
| 1960 | Our American Heritage | Margaret Morrison Carnegie | Episode: "Millionaire's Mite" |
| 1964 | The Ghost of Sierra de Cobre | Paulina | TV movie |
| 1968 | Elizabeth the Queen | Queen Elizabeth I | TV movie |
| 1969 | The File on Devlin | Elizabeth Devlin | TV movie |
| 1973 | The Borrowers | Aunt Sophy | TV movie |
| 1974 | The Underground Man | Mrs. Snow | TV movie |
| 1974 | The Chinese Prime Minister | She | TV movie |
| 1983 | Medea | Nurse | TV movie |
| 1984–1987 | Santa Barbara | Minx Lockridge | 66 episodes |
| 1985 | The Booth | | TV movie |

=== Radio broadcasts ===
| Year | Program | Episode/source |
|---|---|---|
| 1953 | Theatre Guild on the Air | Black Chiffon |

== Sources ==
- Dame Judith Anderson papers, at the University of California, Santa Barbara Library; accessed 19 August 2014.
- Dame Judith Anderson prompts, at the National Library of Australia website; accessed 19 August 2014.
- Dame Judith Anderson at the National Film and Sound Archive
