= Actor Award for Outstanding Performance by a Male Actor in a Television Movie or Limited Series =

American award for acting in television

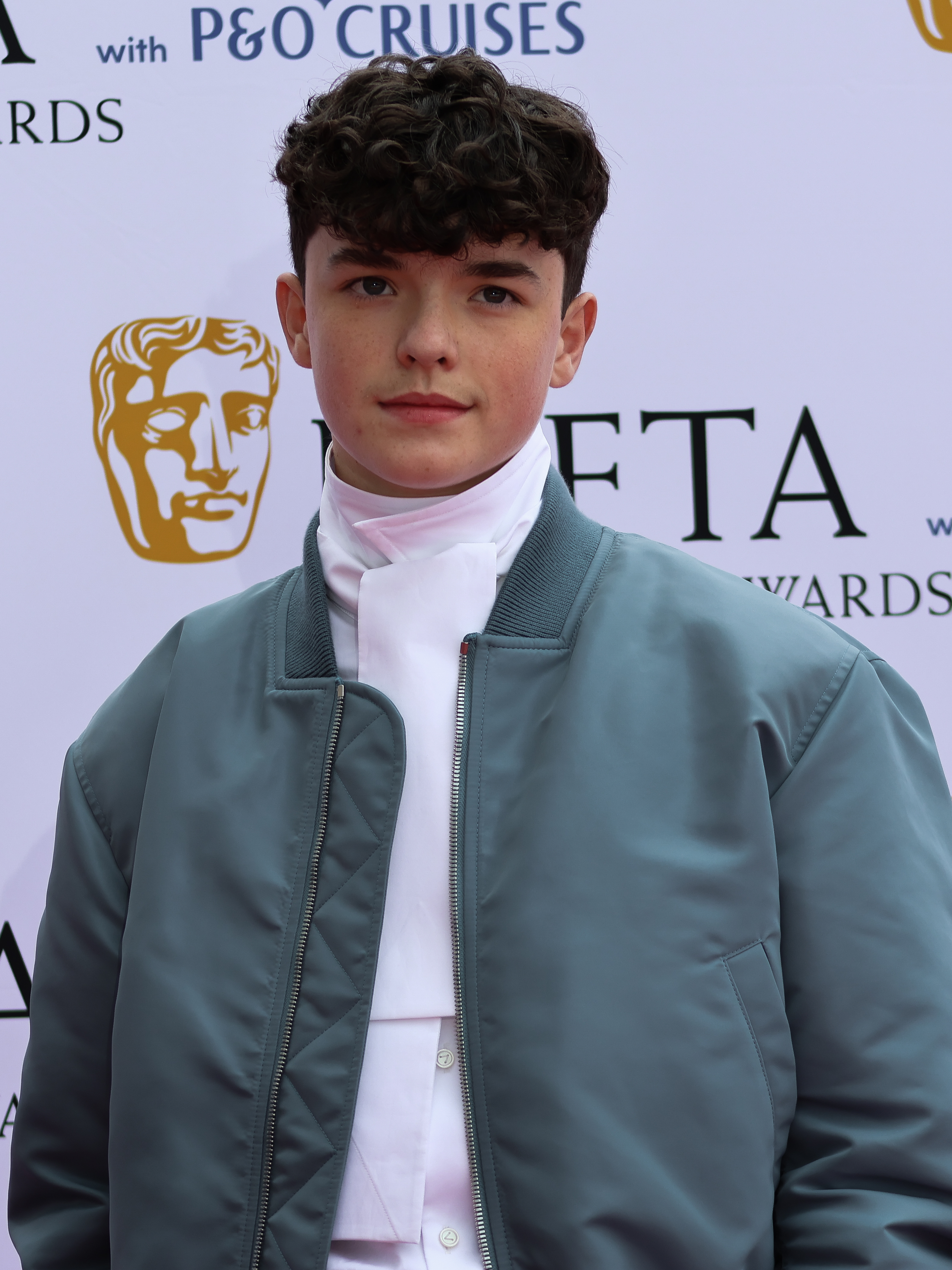
- Awarded for: Outstanding Performance by a Male Actor in a Television Movie or Limited Series
- Location: Los Angeles, California
- Presented by: SAG-AFTRA
- Currently held by: Owen Cooper for Adolescence (2025)
- Website: sagawards.org

The Actor Award for Outstanding Performance by a Male Actor in a Television Movie or Limited Series is an award given by the Screen Actors Guild to honor the finest acting achievements in a television movie or limited series.

In this category four actors have received two awards each: Paul Giamatti (John Adams, Too Big to Fail), Al Pacino (Angels in America, You Don't Know Jack), Gary Sinise (Truman, George Wallace), and Mark Ruffalo (The Normal Heart, I Know This Much Is True).

== Winners and nominees ==
indicates the winner.

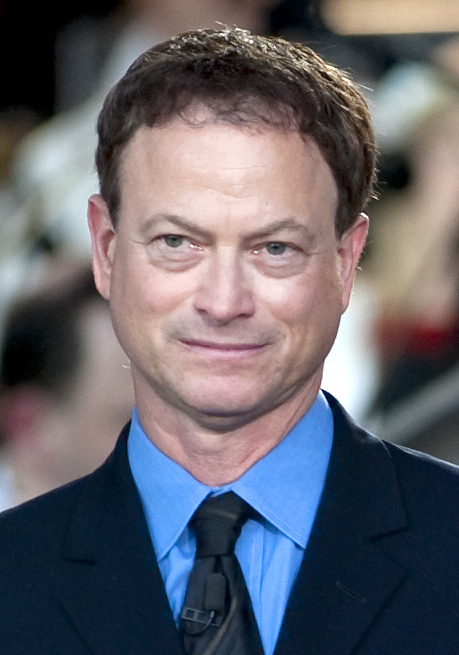
Gary Sinise won twice for Truman (1995) and George Wallace (1997)

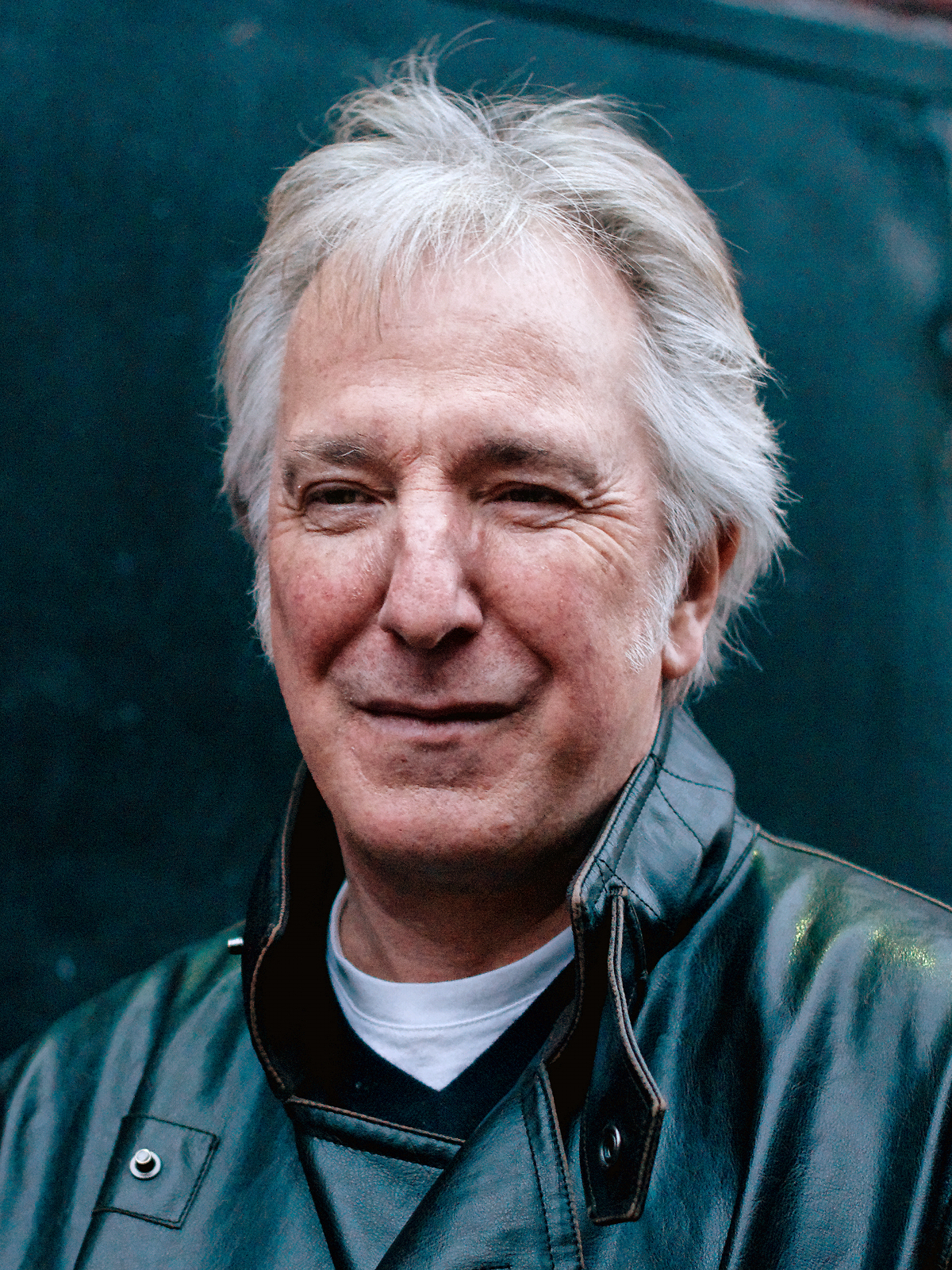
Alan Rickman won for Rasputin: Dark Servant of Destiny (1996)

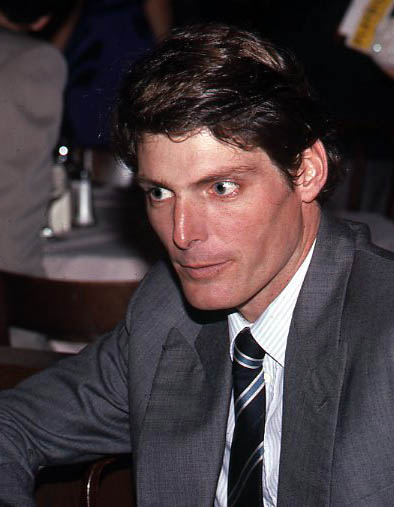
Christopher Reeve won for Rear Window (1998)

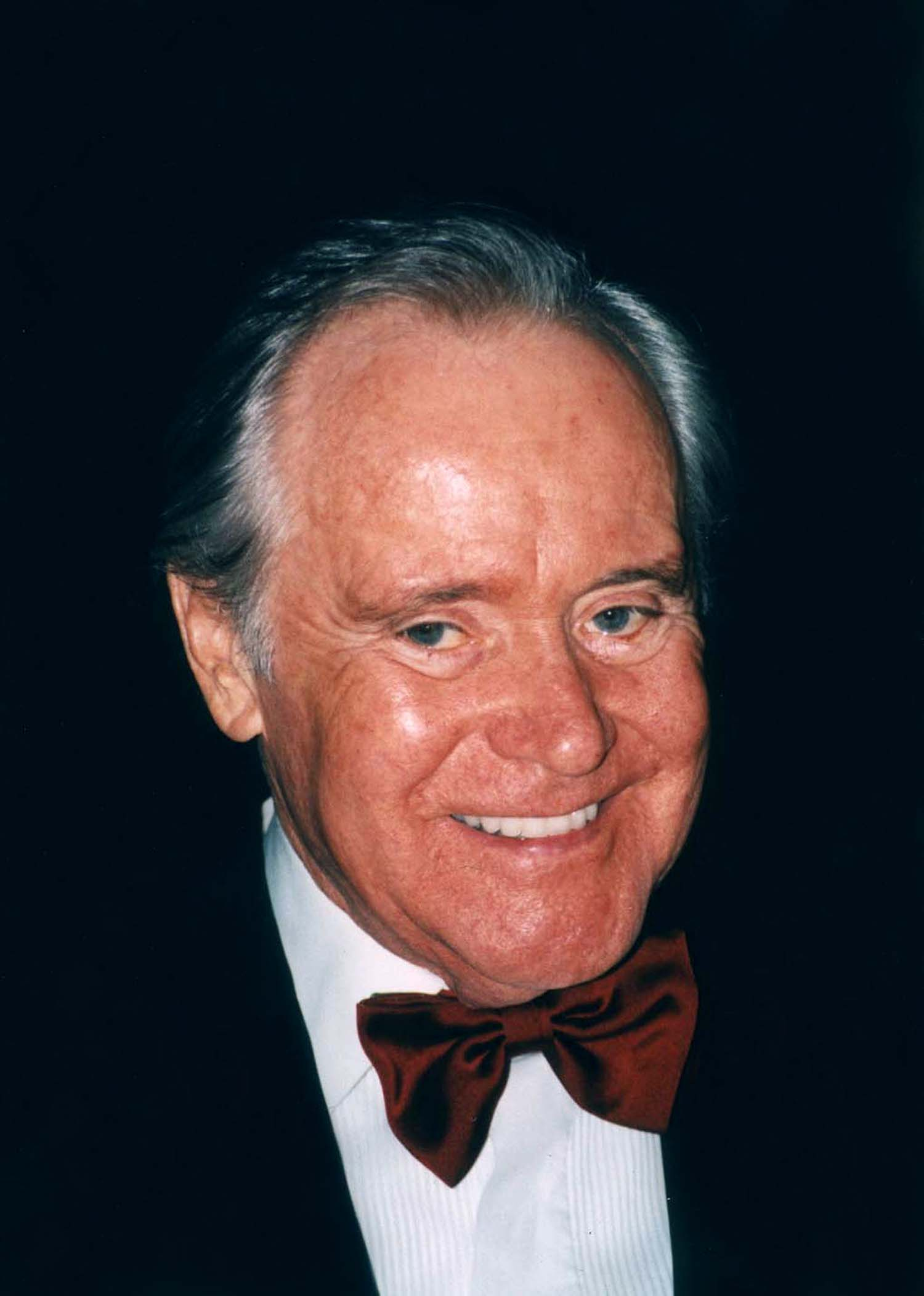
Jack Lemmon won for Tuesdays with Morrie (1999)

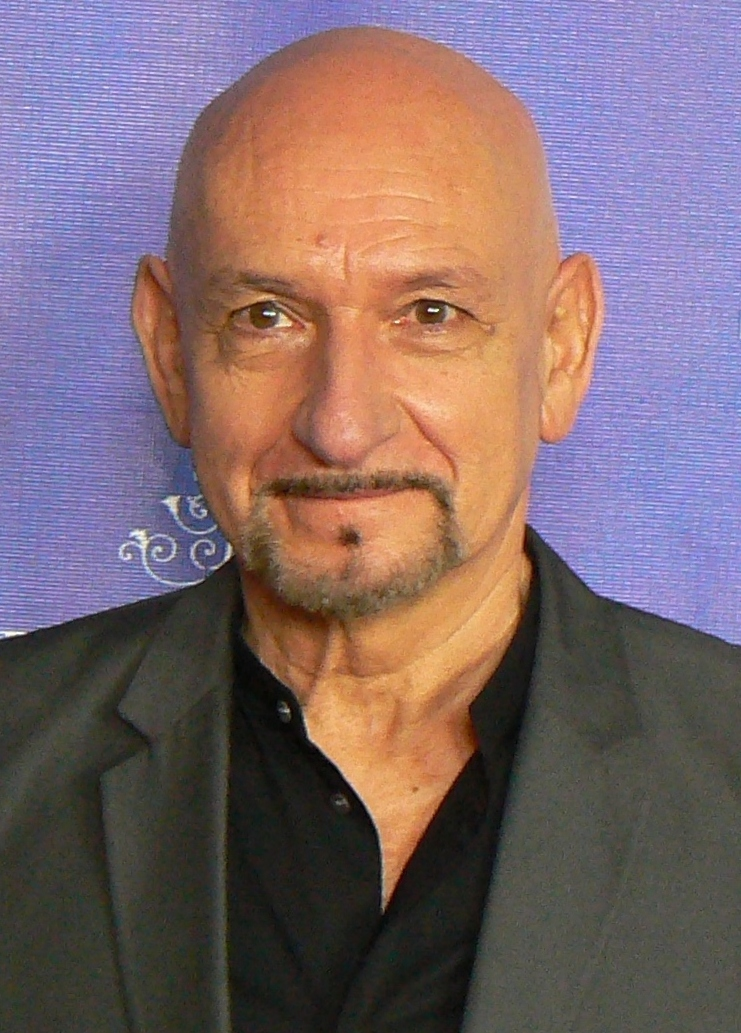
Ben Kingsley won for Anne Frank: The Whole Story (2001)

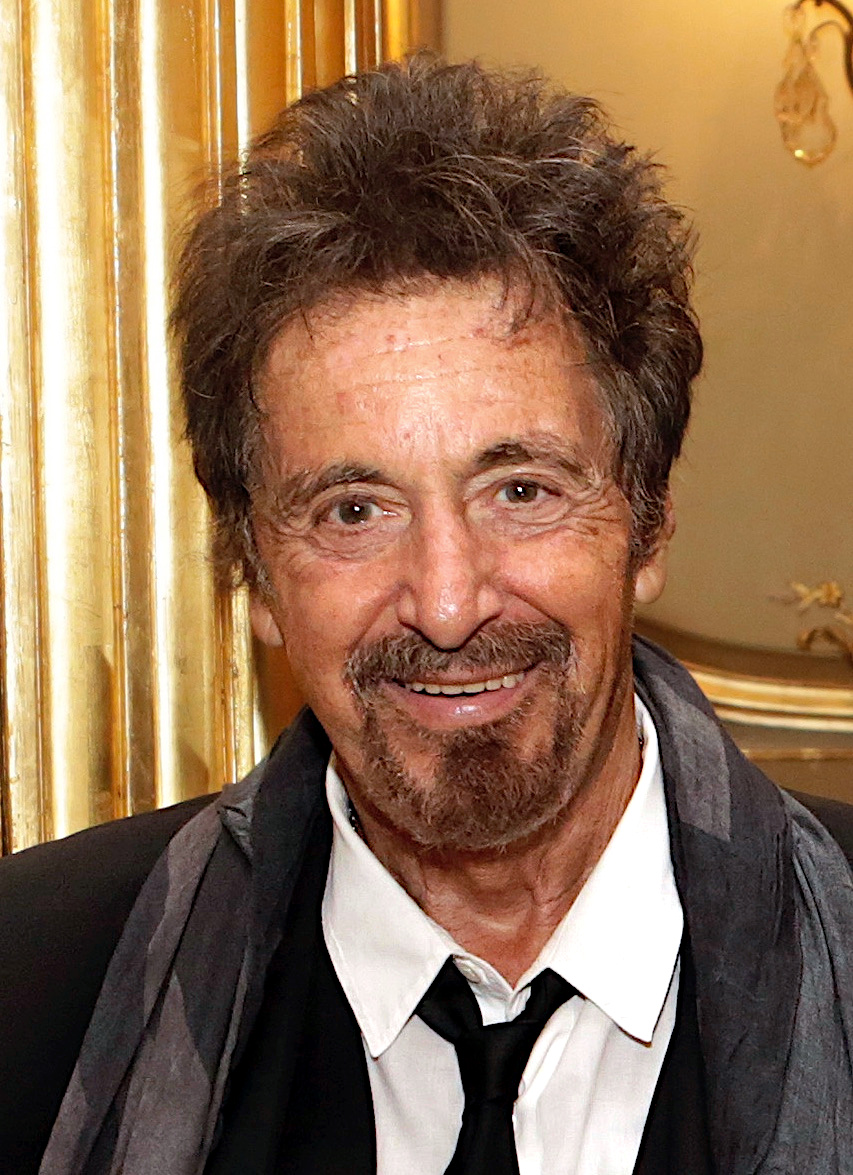
Al Pacino won twice for Angels in America (2003) and You Don't Know Jack (2010)

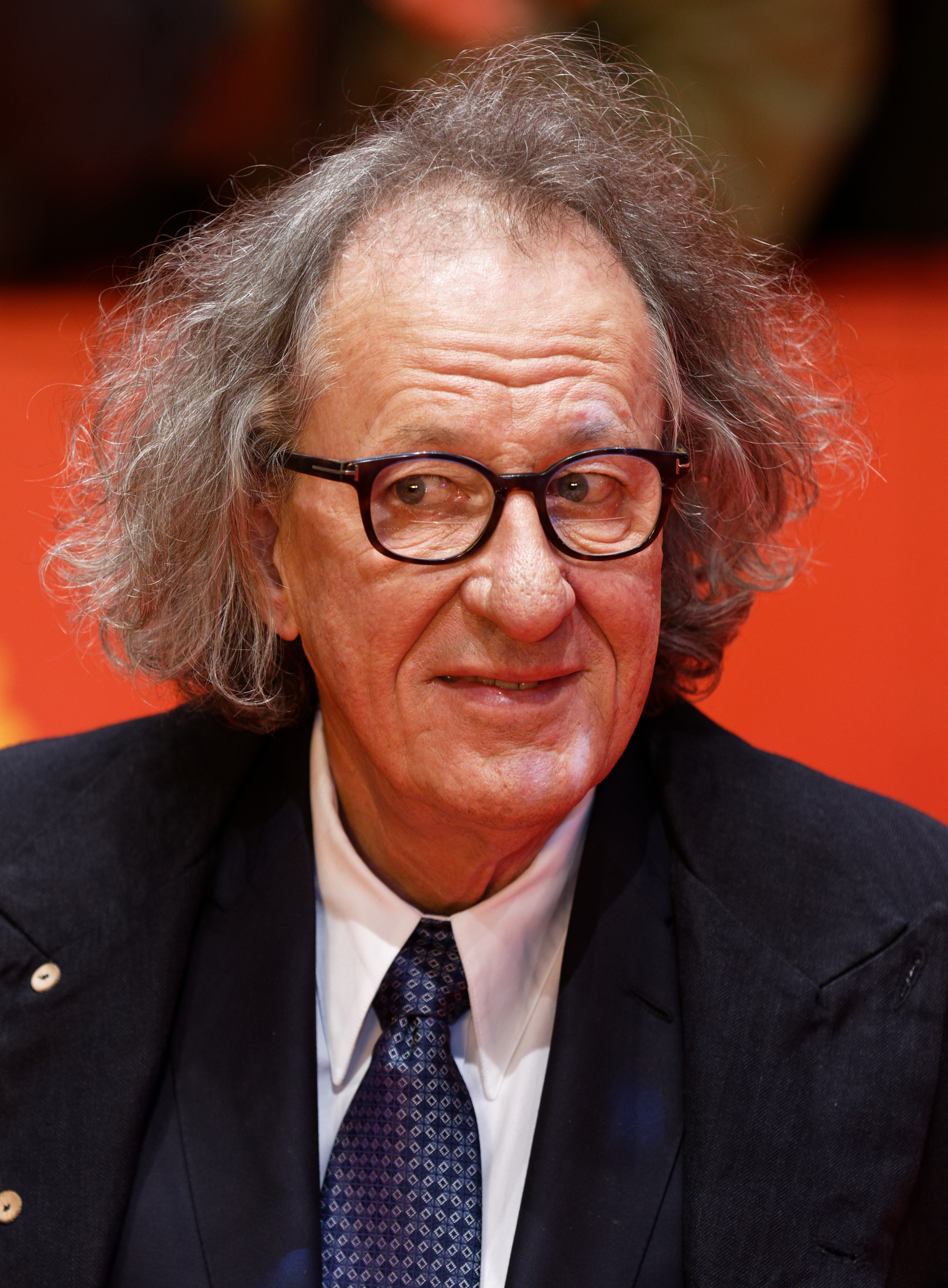
Geoffrey Rush won for The Life and Death of Peter Sellers (2004)

Paul Newman won for Empire Falls (2005)

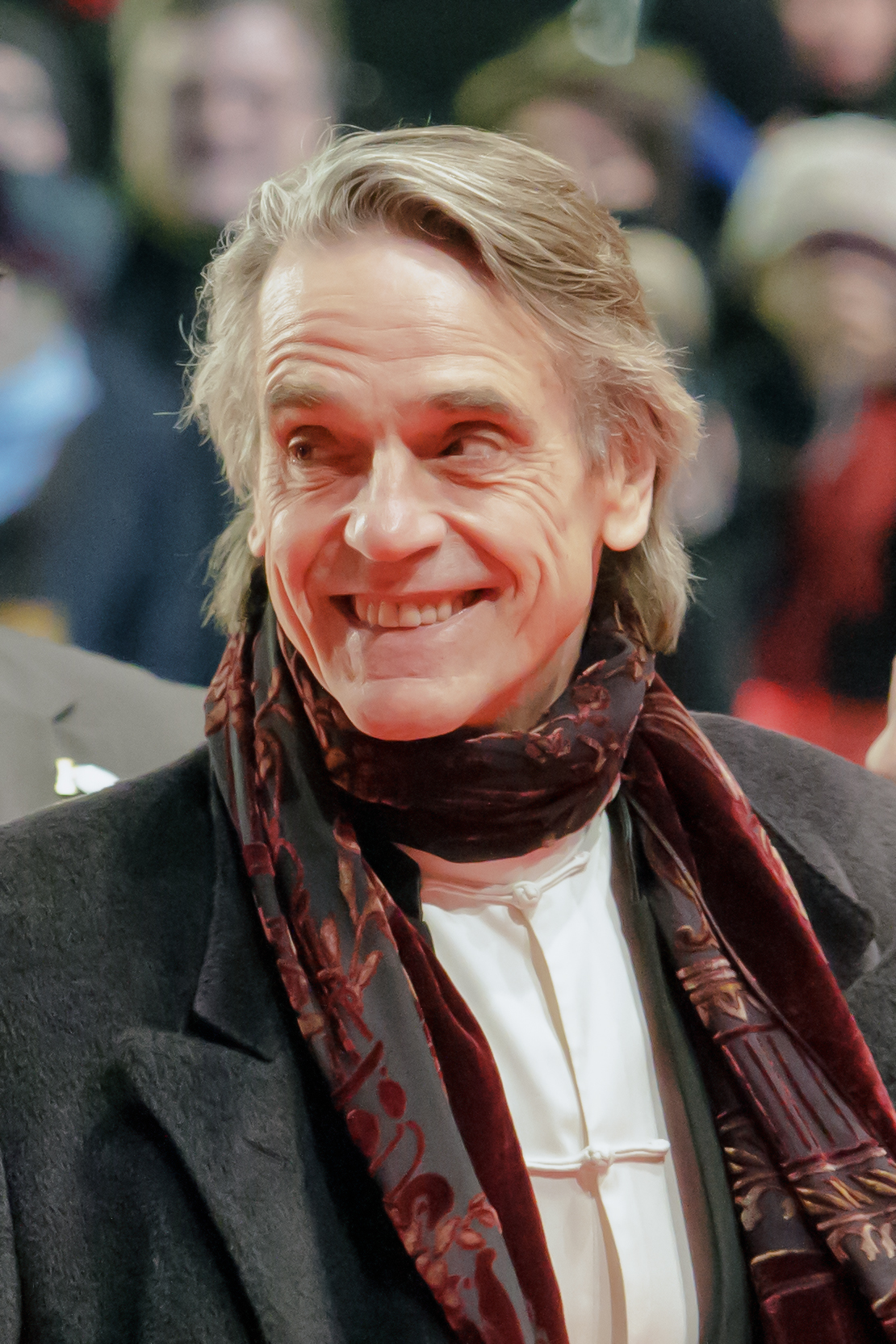
Jeremy Irons won for Elizabeth I (2006)

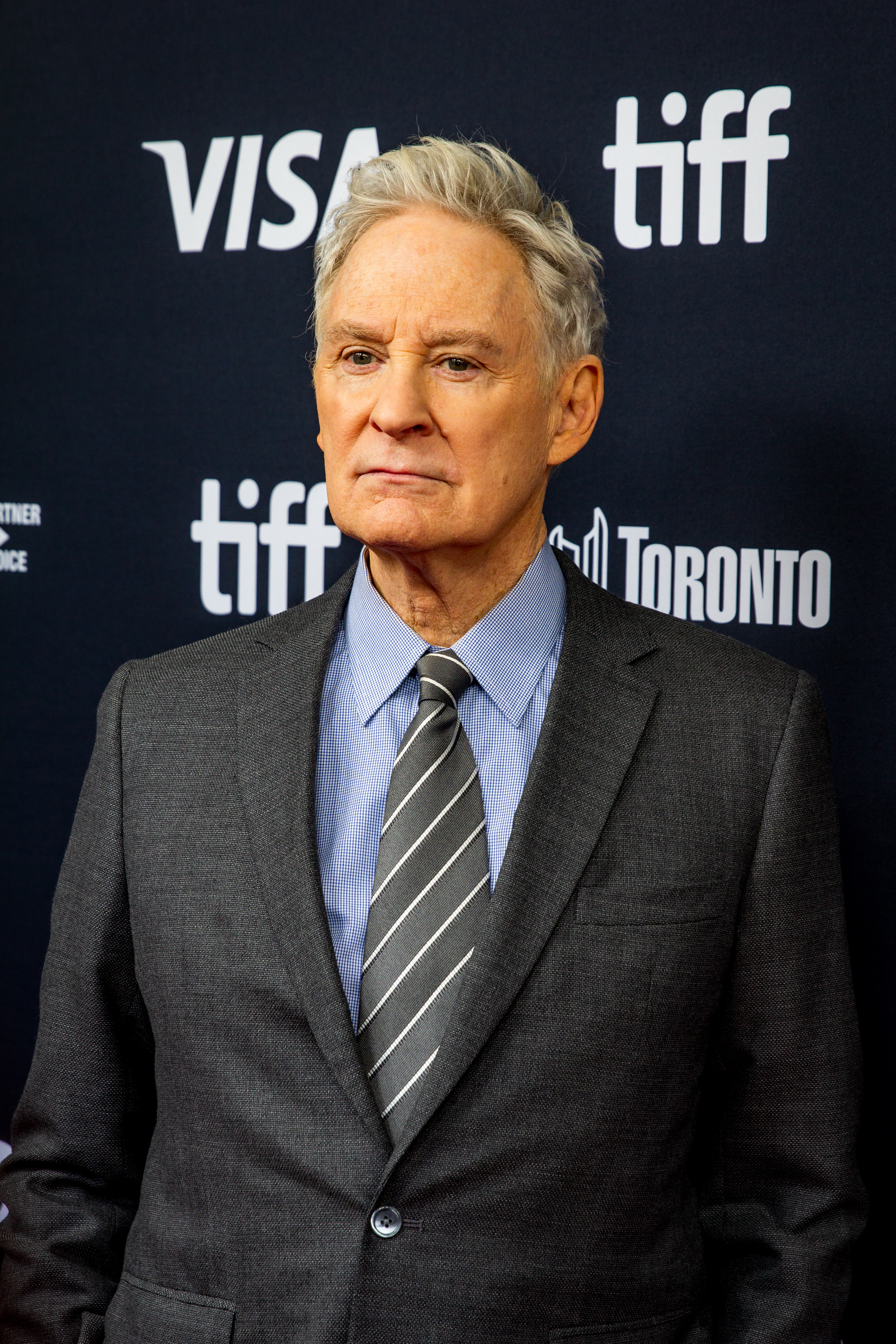
Kevin Kline won for As You Like It (2007)

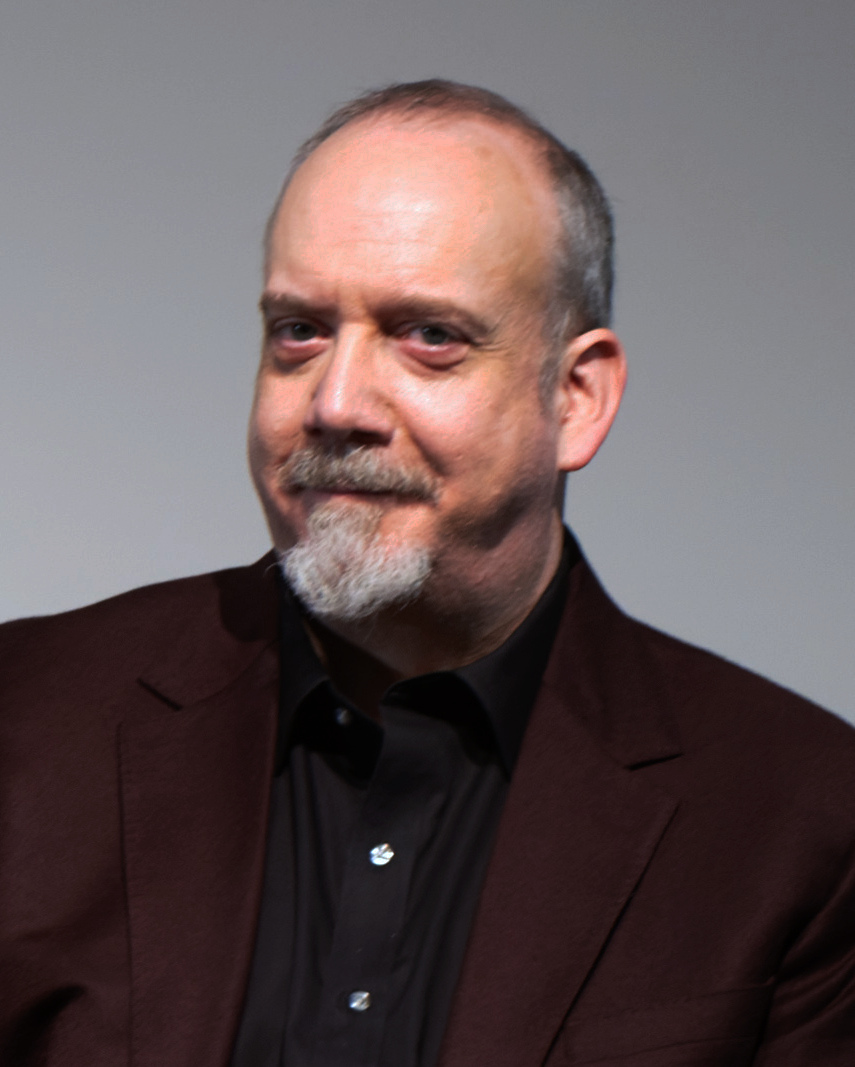
Paul Giamatti won twice for John Adams (2008) and Too Big to Fail (2011)

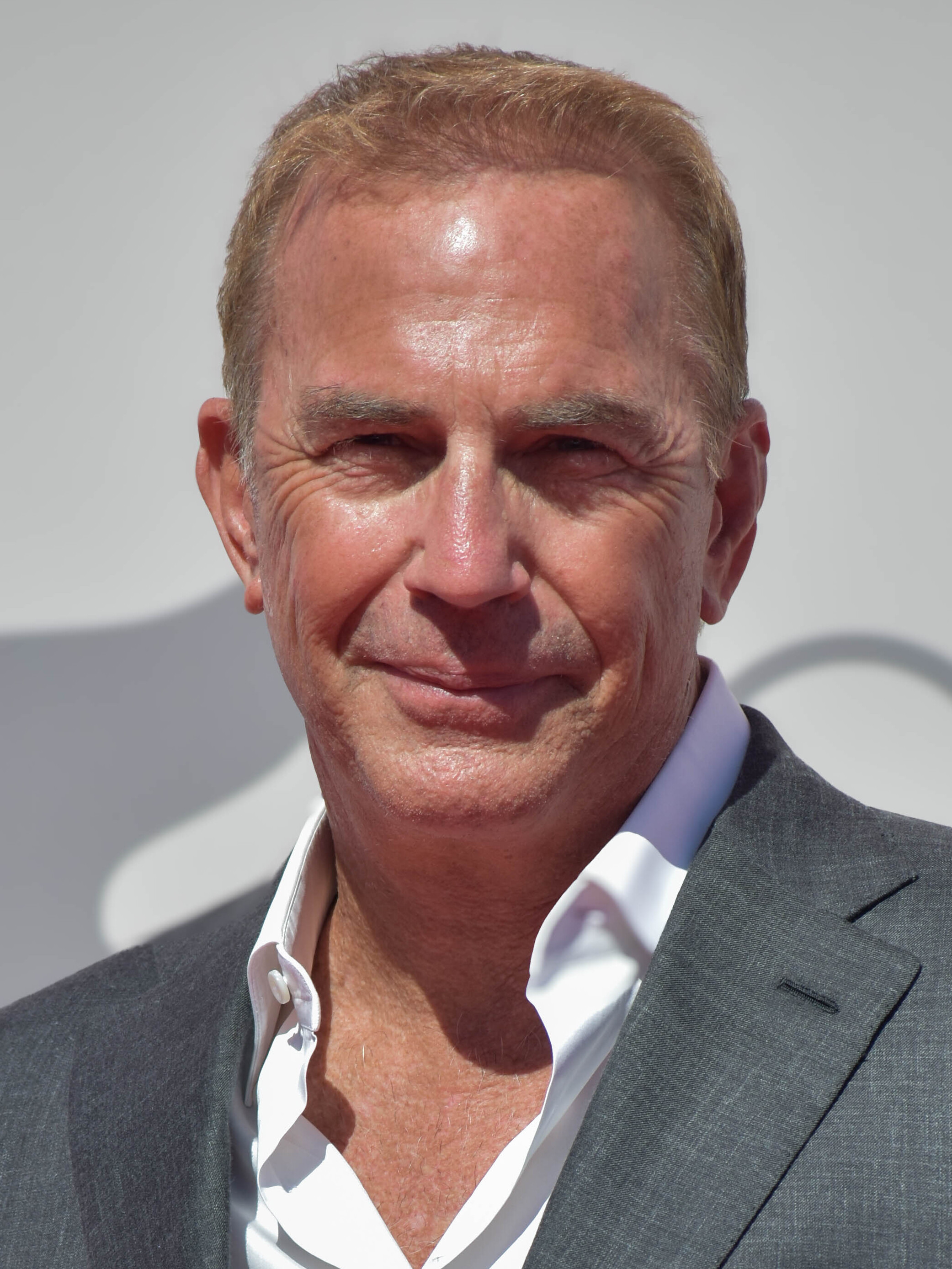
Kevin Costner won for Hatfields & McCoys (2012)

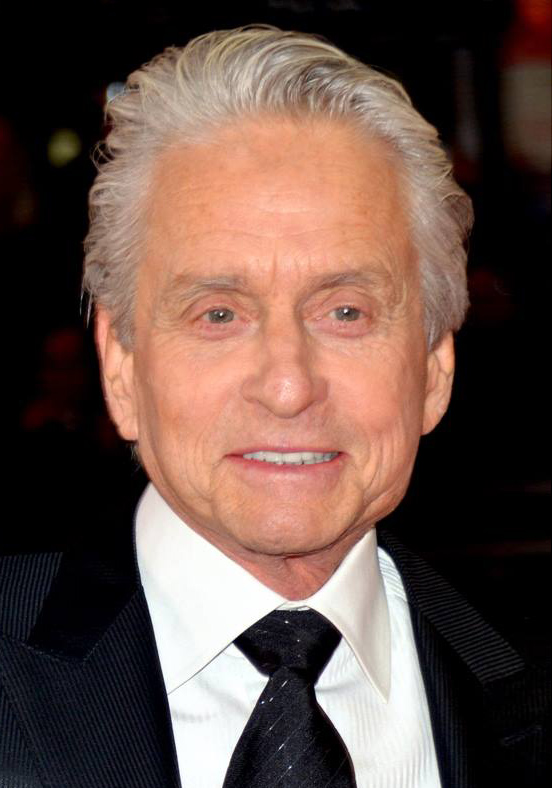
Michael Douglas won for Behind the Candelabra (2013)

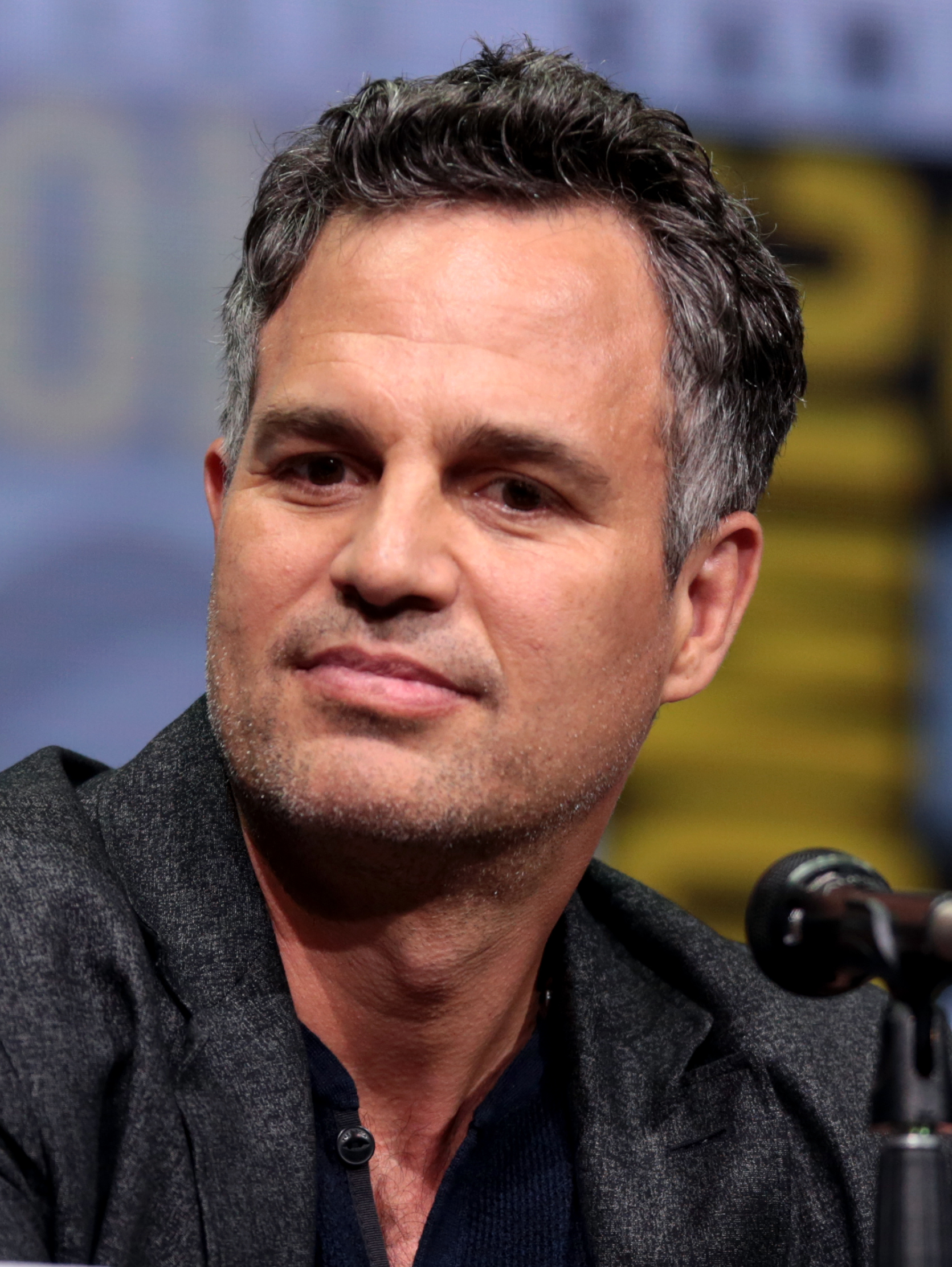
Mark Ruffalo won twice for The Normal Heart (2014) and I Know This Much Is True (2020)

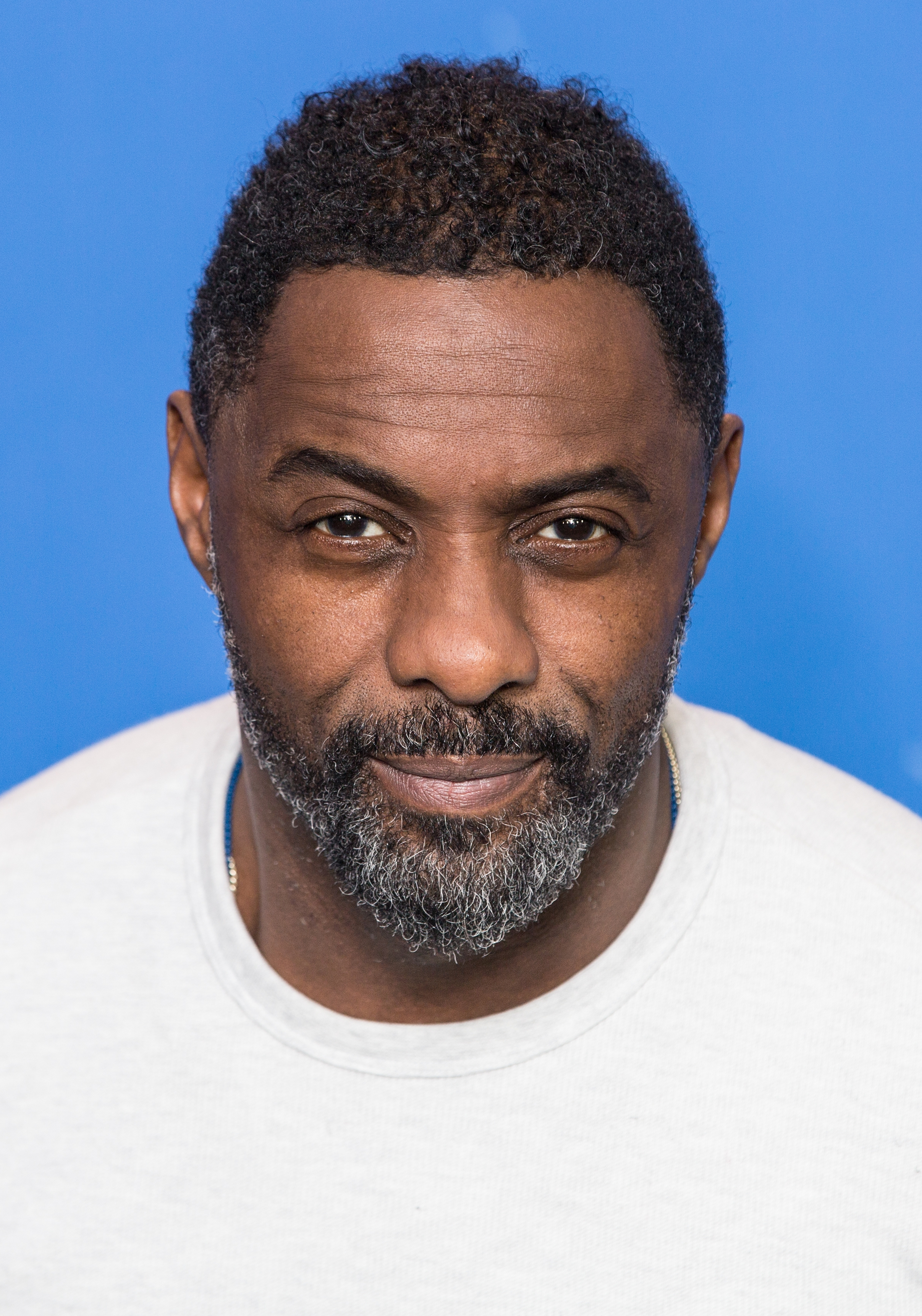
Idris Elba won for Luther (2015)

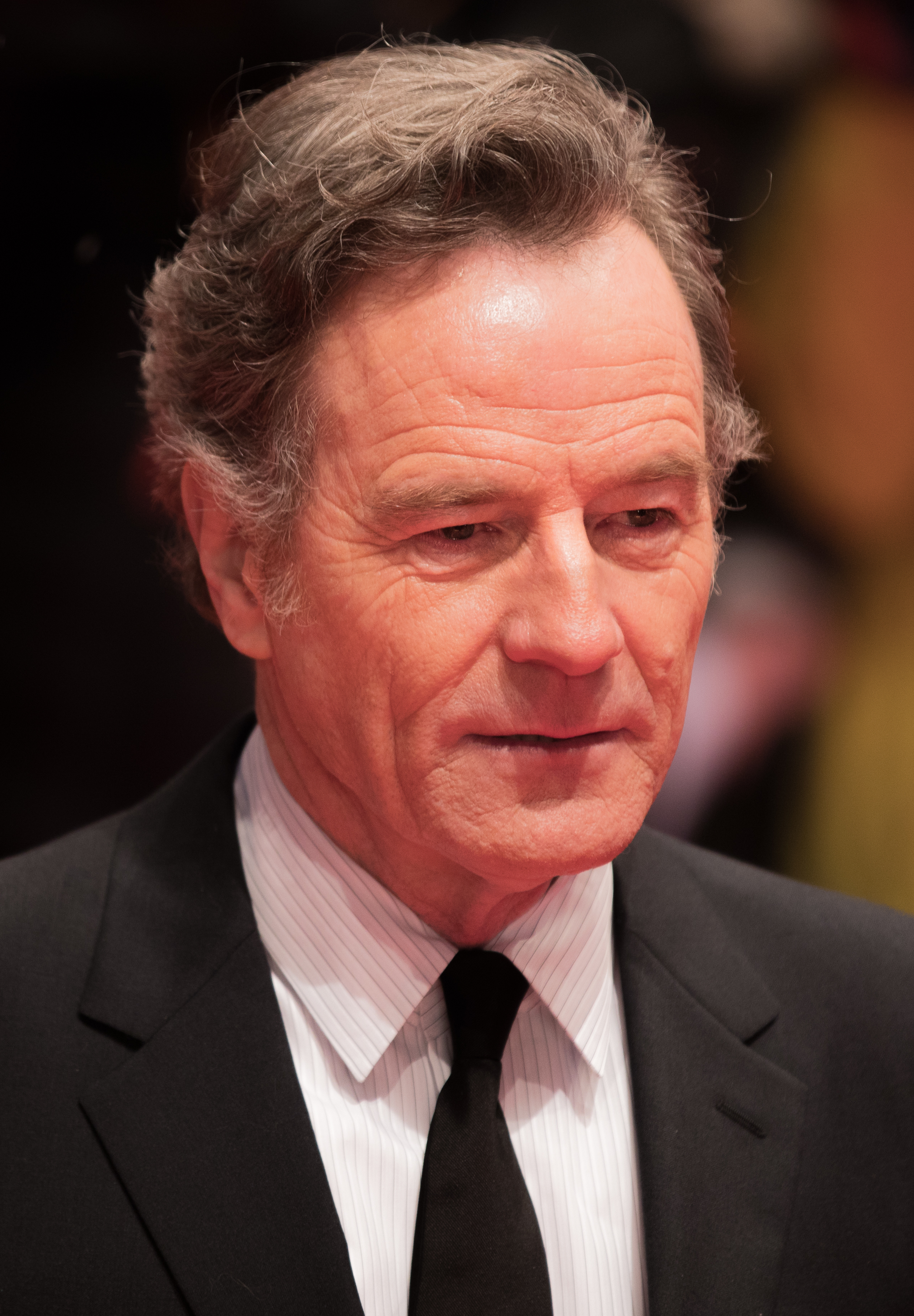
Bryan Cranston won for All the Way (2016)

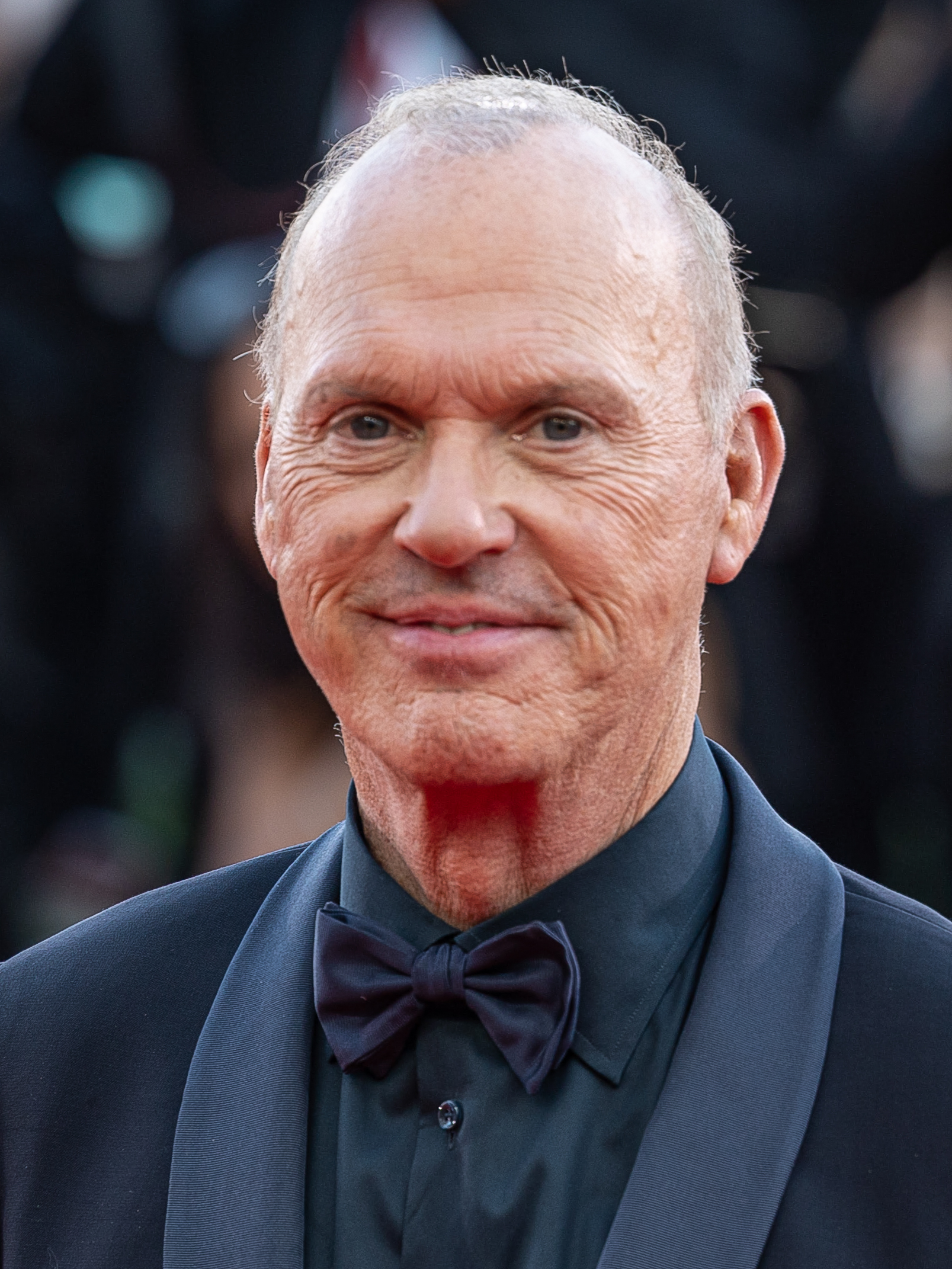
Michael Keaton won for Dopesick (2021)

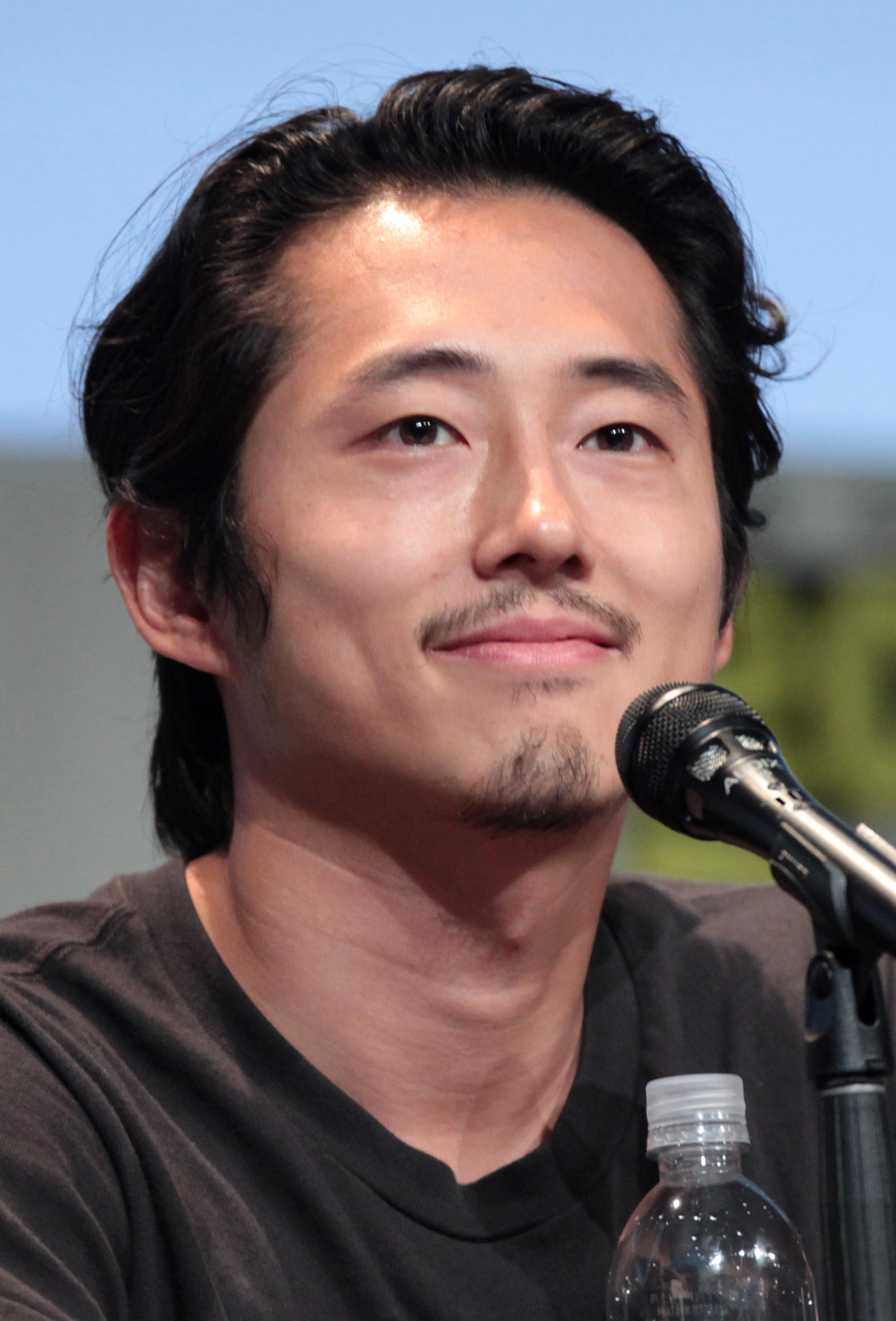
Steven Yeun won for Beef (2023)

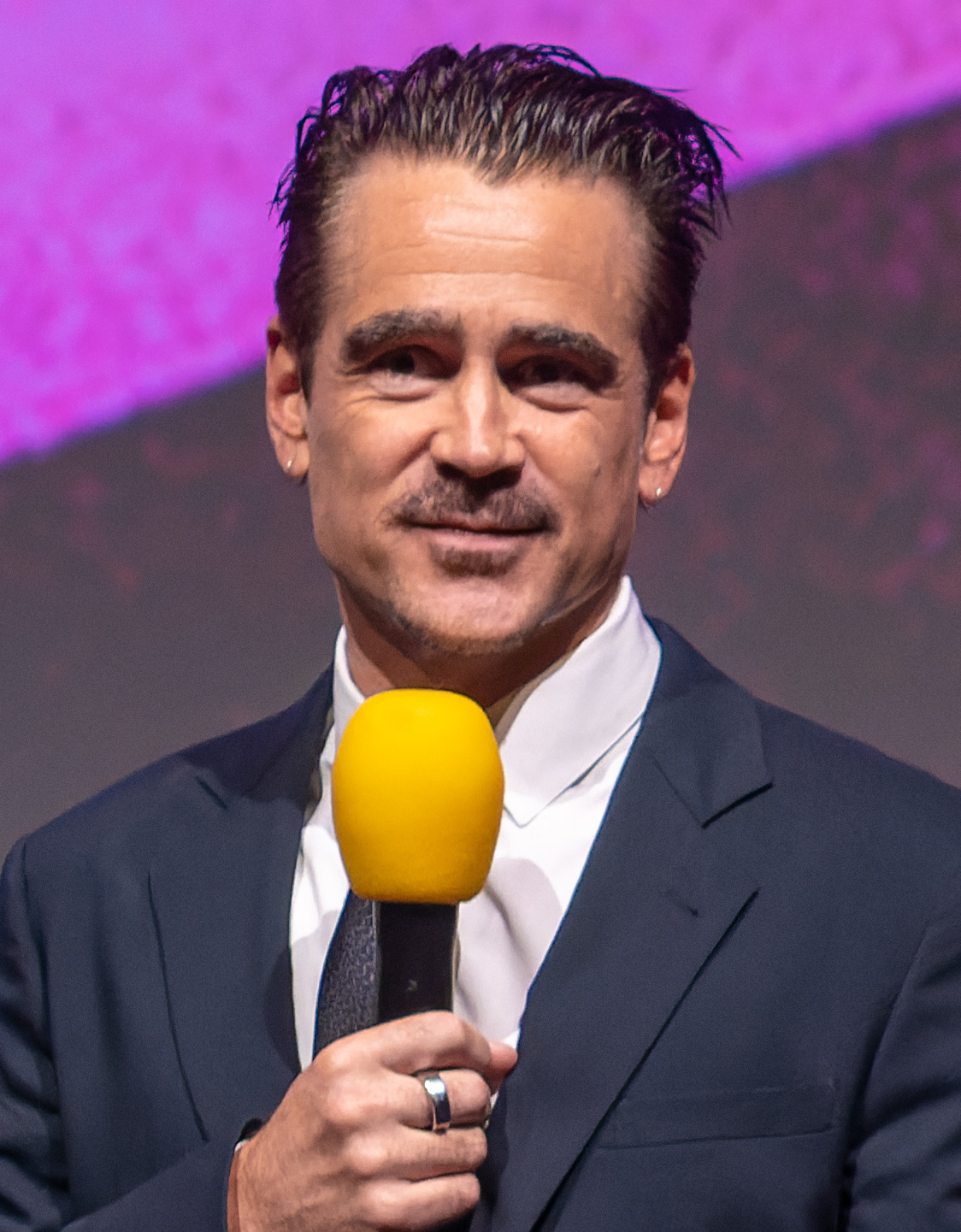
Colin Farrell won for The Penguin (2024)

=== 1990s ===
Year	Actor	Work	Role(s)	Ref.
1994 (1st)	Raúl Juliá (posthumous)	The Burning Season	Chico Mendes	
1994 (1st)	James Garner	The Rockford Files: I Still Love L.A.	Jim Rockford	
1994 (1st)	John Malkovich	Heart of Darkness	Colonel Kurtz	
1994 (1st)	Gary Sinise	The Stand	Stu Redman	
1994 (1st)	Forest Whitaker	The Enemy Within	Colonel MacKenzie "Mac" Casey	
1995 (2nd)	Gary Sinise	Truman	Harry S. Truman	
1995 (2nd)	Alec Baldwin	A Streetcar Named Desire	Stanley Kowalski	
1995 (2nd)	Laurence Fishburne	The Tuskegee Airmen	Hannibal Lee	
1995 (2nd)	James Garner	The Rockford Files: A Blessing in Disguise	Jim Rockford	
1995 (2nd)	Tommy Lee Jones	The Good Old Boys	Hewey Calloway	
1996 (3rd)	Alan Rickman	Rasputin	Grigori Rasputin	
1996 (3rd)	Armand Assante	Gotti	John Gotti	
1996 (3rd)	Beau Bridges	Hidden in America	Bill Januson	
1996 (3rd)	Robert Duvall	The Man Who Captured Eichmann	Adolf Eichmann	
1996 (3rd)	Ed Harris	Riders of the Purple Sage	Jim Lassiter	
1997 (4th)	Gary Sinise	George Wallace	George Wallace	
1997 (4th)	Jack Lemmon	12 Angry Men	Juror #8	
1997 (4th)	Sidney Poitier	Mandela and de Klerk	Nelson Mandela	
1997 (4th)	Ving Rhames	Don King: Only in America	Don King	
1997 (4th)	George C. Scott	12 Angry Men	Juror #3	
1998 (5th)	Christopher Reeve	Rear Window	Jason Kemp	
1998 (5th)	Charles S. Dutton	Blind Faith	Charles Williams	
1998 (5th)	James Garner	Legalese	Norman Keane	
1998 (5th)	Ben Kingsley	The Tale of Sweeney Todd	Sweeney Todd	
1998 (5th)	Ray Liotta	The Rat Pack	Frank Sinatra	
1998 (5th)	Stanley Tucci	Winchell	Walter Winchell	
1999 (6th)	Jack Lemmon	Tuesdays with Morrie	Morris "Morrie" Schwartz	
1999 (6th)	Hank Azaria	Tuesdays with Morrie	Mitch Albom	
1999 (6th)	Peter Fonda	The Passion of Ayn Rand	Frank O'Connor	
1999 (6th)	George C. Scott (posthumous)	Inherit the Wind	Matthew Harrison Brady	
1999 (6th)	Patrick Stewart	A Christmas Carol	Ebenezer Scrooge	

=== 2000s ===
Year	Actor	Work	Role(s)	Ref.
2000 (7th)	Brian Dennehy	Death of a Salesman	Willy Loman	
2000 (7th)	Alec Baldwin	Nuremberg	Justice Robert H. Jackson	
2000 (7th)	Brian Cox	Nuremberg	Hermann Göring	
2000 (7th)	Danny Glover	Freedom Song	Will Walker	
2000 (7th)	John Lithgow	Don Quixote	Don Quixote	
2000 (7th)	James Woods	Dirty Pictures	Dennis Barrie	
2001 (8th)	Ben Kingsley	Anne Frank: The Whole Story	Otto Frank	
2001 (8th)	Alan Alda	Club Land	Willie Walters	
2001 (8th)	Richard Dreyfuss	The Day Reagan Was Shot	Alexander Haig	
2001 (8th)	James Franco	James Dean	James Dean	
2001 (8th)	Gregory Hines	Bojangles	Bill "Bojangles" Robinson	
2002 (9th)	William H. Macy	Door to Door	Bill Porter	
2002 (9th)	Albert Finney	The Gathering Storm	Winston Churchill	
2002 (9th)	Brad Garrett	Gleason	Jackie Gleason	
2002 (9th)	Sean Hayes	Martin and Lewis	Jerry Lewis	
2002 (9th)	John Turturro	Monday Night Mayhem	Howard Cosell	
2003 (10th)	Al Pacino	Angels in America	Roy Cohn	
2003 (10th)	Justin Kirk	Angels in America	Prior Walter / Man in Park	
2003 (10th)	Jeffrey Wright	Angels in America	Mr. Lies / Belize / Homeless Man / The Angel Europa	
2003 (10th)	Paul Newman	Our Town	Stage Manager	
2003 (10th)	Forest Whitaker	Deacons for Defense	Marcus Clay	
2004 (11th)	Geoffrey Rush	The Life and Death of Peter Sellers	Peter Sellers	
2004 (11th)	Jamie Foxx	Redemption: The Stan Tookie Williams Story	Stan "Tookie" Williams	
2004 (11th)	William H. Macy	The Wool Cap	Charlie Gigot	
2004 (11th)	Barry Pepper	3: The Dale Earnhardt Story	Dale Earnhardt	
2004 (11th)	Jon Voight	The Five People You Meet in Heaven	Eddie	
2005 (12th)	Paul Newman	Empire Falls	Max Roby	
2005 (12th)	Kenneth Branagh	Warm Springs	Franklin D. Roosevelt	
2005 (12th)	Ted Danson	Knights of the South Bronx	David MacEnulty	
2005 (12th)	Ed Harris	Empire Falls	Miles Roby	
2005 (12th)	Christopher Plummer	Our Fathers	Cardinal Bernard Law	
2006 (13th)	Jeremy Irons	Elizabeth I	Robert Dudley, Earl of Leicester	
2006 (13th)	Thomas Haden Church	Broken Trail	Tom Harte	
2006 (13th)	Robert Duvall	Broken Trail	Prentice Ritter	
2006 (13th)	William H. Macy	Nightmares & Dreamscapes	Det. Clyde Umney / Sam Landry	
2006 (13th)	Matthew Perry	The Ron Clark Story	Ron Clark	
2007 (14th)	Kevin Kline	As You Like It	Jacques	
2007 (14th)	Michael Keaton	The Company	James Jesus Angleton	
2007 (14th)	Oliver Platt	The Bronx Is Burning	George Steinbrenner	
2007 (14th)	Sam Shepard	Ruffian	Frank Whiteley	
2007 (14th)	John Turturro	The Bronx Is Burning	Billy Martin	
2008 (15th)	Paul Giamatti	John Adams	John Adams	
2008 (15th)	Tom Wilkinson	John Adams	Benjamin Franklin	
2008 (15th)	Ralph Fiennes	Bernard and Doris	Bernard Lafferty	
2008 (15th)	Kevin Spacey	Recount	Ron Klain	
2008 (15th)	Kiefer Sutherland	24: Redemption	Jack Bauer	
2009 (16th)	Kevin Bacon	Taking Chance	Michael Strobl	
2009 (16th)	Cuba Gooding Jr.	Gifted Hands: The Ben Carson Story	Ben Carson	
2009 (16th)	Jeremy Irons	Georgia O'Keeffe	Alfred Stieglitz	
2009 (16th)	Kevin Kline	Cyrano de Bergerac	Cyrano de Bergerac	
2009 (16th)	Tom Wilkinson	A Number	Salter	

=== 2010s ===
Year	Actor	Work	Role(s)	Ref.
2010 (17th)	Al Pacino	You Don't Know Jack	Dr. Jack Kevorkian	
2010 (17th)	John Goodman	You Don't Know Jack	Neal Nicol	
2010 (17th)	Dennis Quaid	The Special Relationship	Bill Clinton	
2010 (17th)	Édgar Ramírez	Carlos	Ilich Ramírez Sánchez / Carlos the Jackal	
2010 (17th)	Patrick Stewart	Macbeth	Macbeth	
2011 (18th)	Paul Giamatti	Too Big to Fail	Ben Bernanke	
2011 (18th)	Laurence Fishburne	Thurgood	Thurgood Marshall	
2011 (18th)	Greg Kinnear	The Kennedys	John F. Kennedy	
2011 (18th)	Guy Pearce	Mildred Pierce	Monty Beragon	
2011 (18th)	James Woods	Too Big to Fail	Richard S. Fuld Jr.	
2012 (19th)	Kevin Costner	Hatfields & McCoys	Devil Anse Hatfield	
2012 (19th)	Woody Harrelson	Game Change	Steve Schmidt	
2012 (19th)	Ed Harris	Game Change	John McCain	
2012 (19th)	Clive Owen	Hemingway & Gellhorn	Ernest Hemingway	
2012 (19th)	Bill Paxton	Hatfields & McCoys	Randolph McCoy	
2013 (20th)	Michael Douglas	Behind the Candelabra	Liberace	
2013 (20th)	Matt Damon	Behind the Candelabra	Scott Thorson	
2013 (20th)	Jeremy Irons	The Hollow Crown	King Henry IV	
2013 (20th)	Rob Lowe	Killing Kennedy	John F. Kennedy	
2013 (20th)	Al Pacino	Phil Spector	Phil Spector	
2014 (21st)	Mark Ruffalo	The Normal Heart	Ned Weeks	
2014 (21st)	Adrien Brody	Houdini	Harry Houdini	
2014 (21st)	Benedict Cumberbatch	Sherlock: His Last Vow	Sherlock Holmes	
2014 (21st)	Richard Jenkins	Olive Kitteridge	Henry Kitteridge	
2014 (21st)	Billy Bob Thornton	Fargo	Lorne Malvo	
2015 (22nd)	Idris Elba	Luther	John Luther	
2015 (22nd)	Ben Kingsley	Tut	Ay, the Grand Vizier	
2015 (22nd)	Ray Liotta	Texas Rising	Lorca / Tom Mitchell	
2015 (22nd)	Bill Murray	A Very Murray Christmas	Himself	
2015 (22nd)	Mark Rylance	Wolf Hall	Thomas Cromwell	
2016 (23rd)	Bryan Cranston	All the Way	Lyndon B. Johnson	
2016 (23rd)	Riz Ahmed	The Night Of	Nasir "Naz" Khan	
2016 (23rd)	Sterling K. Brown	The People v. O. J. Simpson: American Crime Story	Christopher Darden	
2016 (23rd)	John Turturro	The Night Of	John Stone	
2016 (23rd)	Courtney B. Vance	The People v. O. J. Simpson: American Crime Story	Johnnie Cochran	
2017 (24th)	Alexander Skarsgård	Big Little Lies	Perry Wright	
2017 (24th)	Benedict Cumberbatch	Sherlock: The Lying Detective	Sherlock Holmes	
2017 (24th)	Jeff Daniels	Godless	Frank Griffen	
2017 (24th)	Robert De Niro	The Wizard of Lies	Bernie Madoff	
2017 (24th)	Geoffrey Rush	Genius	Albert Einstein	
2018 (25th)	Darren Criss	The Assassination of Gianni Versace: American Crime Story	Andrew Cunanan	
2018 (25th)	Antonio Banderas	Genius: Picasso	Pablo Picasso	
2018 (25th)	Hugh Grant	A Very English Scandal	Jeremy Thorpe	
2018 (25th)	Anthony Hopkins	King Lear	King Lear	
2018 (25th)	Bill Pullman	The Sinner	Detective Harry Ambrose	
2019 (26th)	Sam Rockwell	Fosse/Verdon	Bob Fosse	
2019 (26th)	Mahershala Ali	True Detective	Wayne Hays	
2019 (26th)	Russell Crowe	The Loudest Voice	Roger Ailes	
2019 (26th)	Jared Harris	Chernobyl	Valery Legasov	
2019 (26th)	Jharrel Jerome	When They See Us	Korey Wise	

=== 2020s ===
Year	Actor	Work	Role(s)	Ref.
2020 (27th)	Mark Ruffalo	I Know This Much Is True	Dominick and Thomas Birdsey	
2020 (27th)	Bill Camp	The Queen's Gambit	William Shaibel	
2020 (27th)	Daveed Diggs	Hamilton	Marquis de Lafayette / Thomas Jefferson	
2020 (27th)	Hugh Grant	The Undoing	Jonathan Fraser	
2020 (27th)	Ethan Hawke	The Good Lord Bird	John Brown	
2021 (28th)	Michael Keaton	Dopesick	Dr. Samuel Finnix	
2021 (28th)	Murray Bartlett	The White Lotus	Armond	
2021 (28th)	Oscar Isaac	Scenes from a Marriage	Jonathan Levy	
2021 (28th)	Ewan McGregor	Halston	Halston	
2021 (28th)	Evan Peters	Mare of Easttown	Colin Zabel	
2022 (29th)	Sam Elliott	1883	Shea Brennan	
2022 (29th)	Steve Carell	The Patient	Alan Strauss	
2022 (29th)	Taron Egerton	Black Bird	James "Jimmy" Keane	
2022 (29th)	Paul Walter Hauser	Black Bird	Lawrence "Larry" Hall	
2022 (29th)	Evan Peters	Monster: The Jeffrey Dahmer Story	Jeffrey Dahmer	
2023 (30th)	Steven Yeun	Beef	Danny Cho	
2023 (30th)	Matt Bomer	Fellow Travelers	Hawkins "Hawk" Fuller	
2023 (30th)	Jon Hamm	Fargo	Roy Tillman	
2023 (30th)	David Oyelowo	Lawmen: Bass Reeves	Bass Reeves	
2023 (30th)	Tony Shalhoub	Mr. Monk's Last Case: A Monk Movie	Adrian Monk	
2024 (31st)	Colin Farrell	The Penguin	Oswald "Oz" Cobb / The Penguin	
2024 (31st)	Javier Bardem	Monsters: The Lyle and Erik Menendez Story	José Menendez	
2024 (31st)	Richard Gadd	Baby Reindeer	Donny Dunn	
2024 (31st)	Kevin Kline	Disclaimer	Stephen Brigstocke	
2024 (31st)	Andrew Scott	Ripley	Tom Ripley	
2025 (32nd)	Owen Cooper	Adolescence	Jamie Miller	
2025 (32nd)	Jason Bateman	Black Rabbit	Vince Friedken	
2025 (32nd)	Stephen Graham	Adolescence	Eddie Miller	
2025 (32nd)	Charlie Hunnam	Monster: The Ed Gein Story	Ed Gein	
2025 (32nd)	Matthew Rhys	The Beast in Me	Nile Jarvis	

== Actors with multiple awards ==
2 wins

- Paul Giamatti
- Al Pacino
- Gary Sinise
- Mark Ruffalo

== Actors with multiple nominations ==
3 nominations

- James Garner
- Ed Harris
- Jeremy Irons
- Ben Kingsley
- Kevin Kline
- William H. Macy
- Al Pacino
- Gary Sinise
- John Turturro

2 nominations

- Alec Baldwin
- Benedict Cumberbatch
- Robert Duvall
- Laurence Fishburne
- Paul Giamatti
- Hugh Grant
- Michael Keaton
- Jack Lemmon
- Ray Liotta
- Paul Newman
- Evan Peters
- Mark Ruffalo
- Geoffrey Rush
- George C. Scott
- Patrick Stewart
- Forest Whitaker
- Tom Wilkinson
- James Woods

== Programs with multiple nominations ==
3 nominations

- American Crime Story (FX)
- Angels in America (HBO)

2 nominations

- 12 Angry Men (Showtime)
- Adolescence (Netflix)
- Behind the Candelabra (HBO)
- Black Bird (Apple TV+)
- Broken Trail (AMC)
- The Bronx Is Burning (ESPN)
- Empire Falls (HBO)
- Fargo (FX)
- Game Change (HBO)
- Genius (National Geographic)
- Hatfields & McCoys (History)
- John Adams (HBO)
- Monster (Netflix)
- The Night Of (HBO)
- Nuremberg (TNT)
- The Rockford Files (NBC)
- Sherlock (PBS)
- Too Big to Fail (HBO)
- Tuesdays with Morrie (ABC)
- You Don't Know Jack (HBO)

== See also ==
- Primetime Emmy Award for Outstanding Lead Actor in a Limited or Anthology Series or Movie
- Primetime Emmy Award for Outstanding Supporting Actor in a Limited or Anthology Series or Movie
- Golden Globe Award for Best Actor – Miniseries or Television Film
- Golden Globe Award for Best Supporting Actor – Series, Miniseries or Television Film
- Critics' Choice Television Award for Best Actor in a Movie/Miniseries
- Critics' Choice Television Award for Best Supporting Actor in a Movie/Miniseries
