= Harpo Productions =

American multimedia production company

- The current logo of Harpo Studios, used since 2010
- Type: Subsidiary
- Industry: Media
- Founded: 1986; 40 years ago
- Founder: Oprah Winfrey
- Headquarters: Chicago, Illinois (1986–2015); West Hollywood, California (2015–present)
- Key people: Oprah Winfrey (chairwoman & CEO); Terry Wood (executive vice-president)
- Owner: Oprah Winfrey
- Number of employees: 12,554 (2012)
- Parent: Harpo, Inc.
- Divisions: Harpo Print; Oprah Winfrey Network; (joint venture with Warner Bros. Discovery; Warner Bros. Discovery holds a controlling stake, while Harpo is considered a "significant" “minority” shareholder)

Harpo Productions (or Harpo Studios) is an American multimedia production company founded by Oprah Winfrey in Chicago and based in West Hollywood, California. The name "Harpo" is "Oprah" spelled backwards, and it was also the name of her on-screen husband in the film The Color Purple (1985).

== History ==
The company's origins trace back to 1985 when Oprah appeared in The Color Purple. Winfrey founded her own company in 1986.

In 1988, Harpo Productions acquired her eponymous talk show from ABC O&O WLS-TV in Chicago, at which time it automatically renewed its deal with King World Productions, who held minority interest, which was set to expire in 1991.

Harpo Productions' subsidiaries consist of Harpo Print, the company's publishing house, and a minority interest in cable network Oprah Winfrey Network (OWN). Harpo originally owned 50% of OWN along with Discovery Communications, which purchased 24.5% of OWN in 2017 and a further 20.5% in 2020, leaving Harpo with 5% ownership.

Past subsidiaries include Harpo Films, the company's film studio which shut down in early 2013, and Harpo Radio, the company's radio broadcasting division that shuttered on January 1, 2015. The company was previously based in Chicago, with Harpo Studios situated in the West Loop neighborhood. The building was demolished in 2016, and new headquarters for McDonald's opened on the site in 2018.

In January 2021, it was announced that Harpo Productions will produce an Oprah Winfrey documentary for Apple TV+. That documentary series became known as The Me You Can't See, which Winfrey co-hosts with Prince Harry, Duke of Sussex.

== Divisions ==
=== OWN ===
Oprah Winfrey Network (OWN) logo

On January 1, 2011, the Oprah Winfrey Network (OWN) launched. It is co-owned by Harpo Studios (5%) and Warner Bros. Entertainment Inc. (95%). The network replaced the Discovery Health Channel, a cable channel previously owned by Discovery Communications, Inc. The network initially had a variety of new shows, including some hosted by the stable of experts Winfrey has cultivated on her daytime talk show including: The Gayle King Show, Our America with Lisa Ling, In The Bedroom with Dr. Laura Berman and Enough Already! with Peter Walsh.

=== Harpo Print, LLC ===
Together with Hearst Magazines, Harpo Print, LLC publishes O, The Oprah Magazine. The company also published O at Home, which Hearst officially folded in 2008 after a four-year run. In July 2020, it was announced that O, The Oprah Magazine will end its regular print edition after the December 2020 issue. The December 2020 of O Magazine featured an article where Oprah thanked readers and also acknowledged it was the magazine's "final monthly print edition."

== Former properties ==
=== Harpo Studios ===
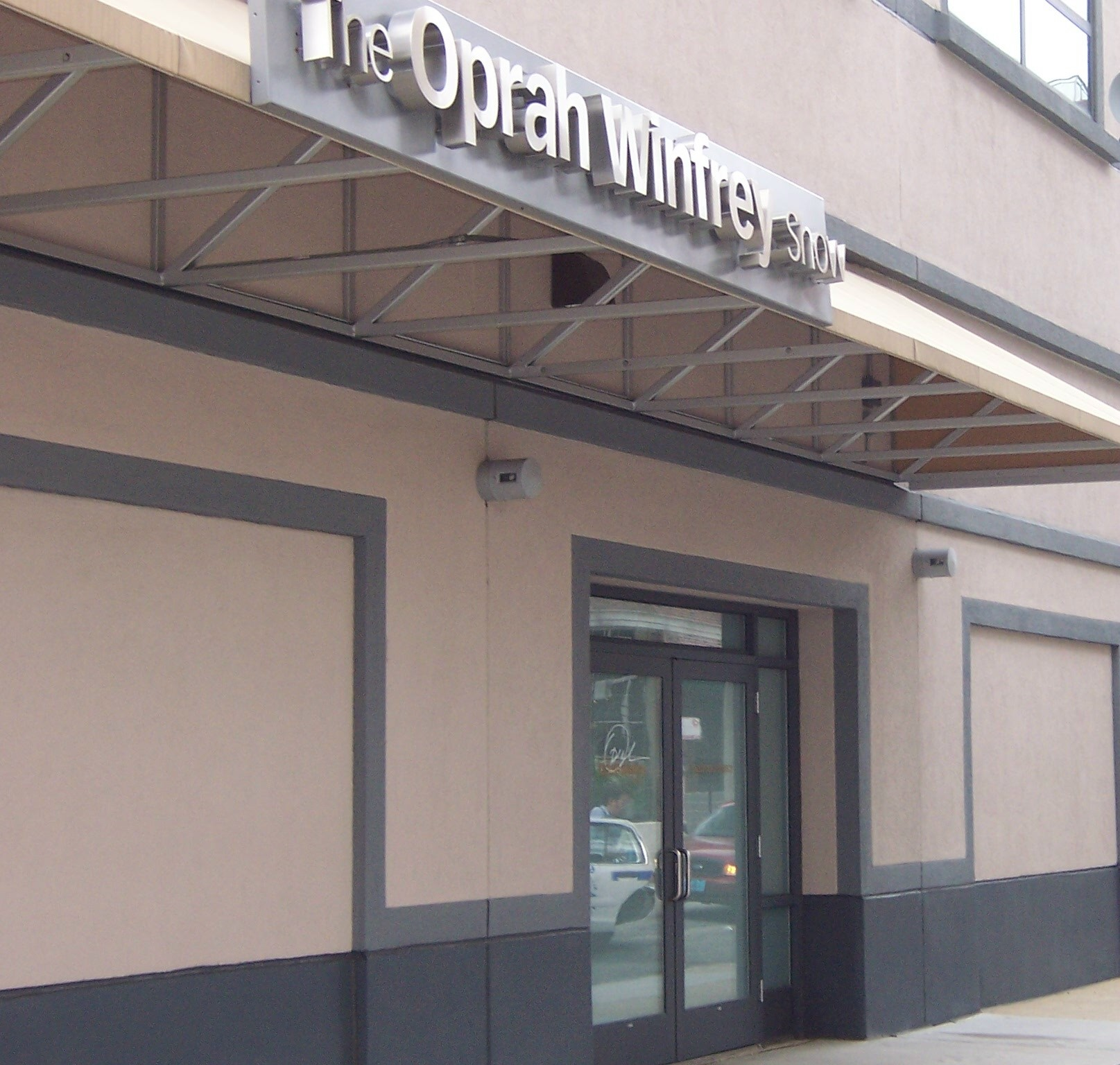
Marquee above entrance at the former Harpo Studios in Chicago (on a site now used by McDonald's as its global headquarters)

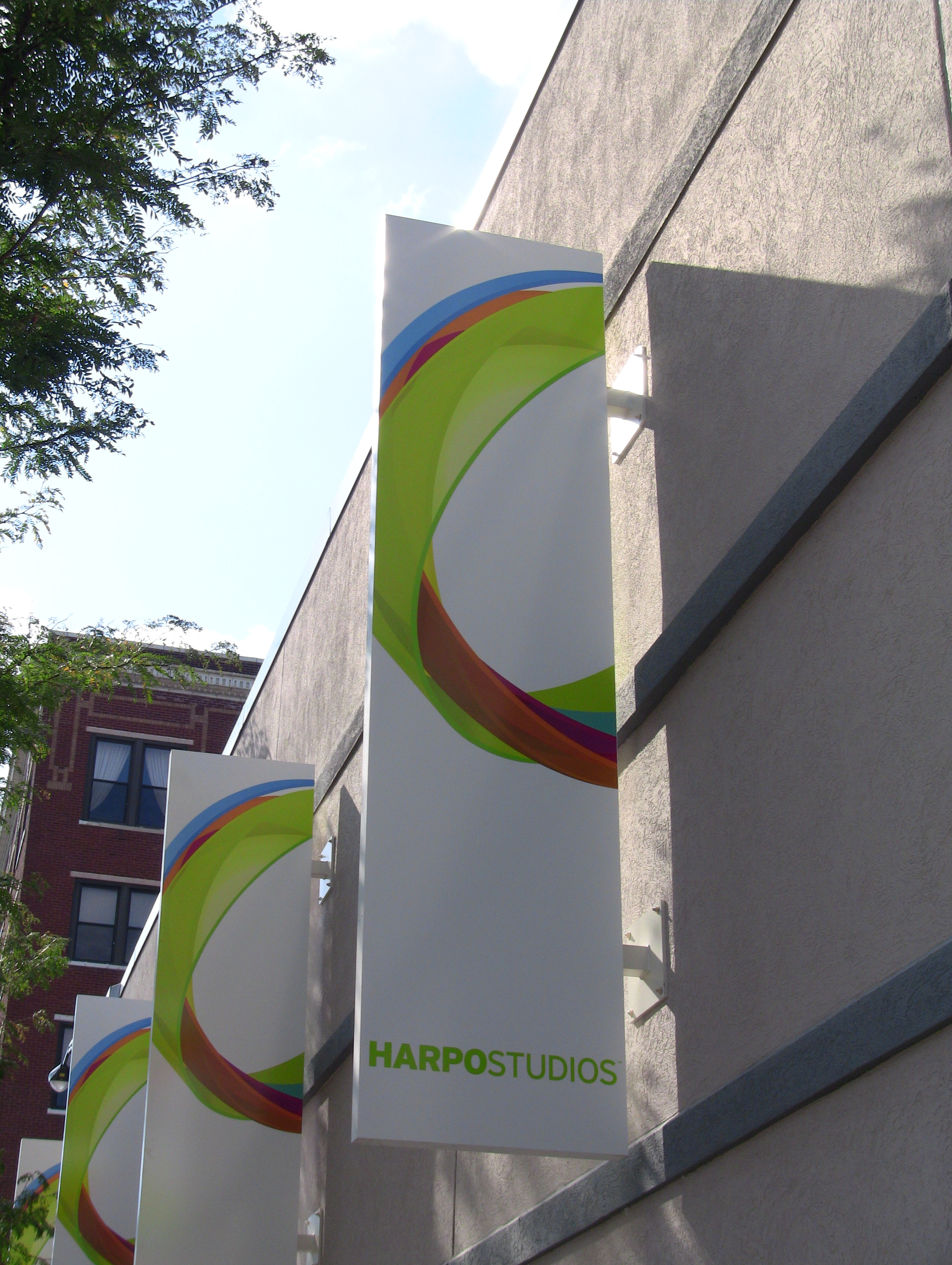
Harpo Studios logo sign banners located on the Washington St. side of the main studio in Chicago, Illinois

Harpo Studios was the home of The Oprah Winfrey Show from January 15, 1990. located in the West Loop neighborhood of Chicago. The studio also housed The Rosie Show, an American evening television talk show which was hosted and produced by actress and comedian Rosie O'Donnell, airing on the Oprah Winfrey Network. Harpo Studios has Emmy Award–winning teams in production designs, lighting, camera work, editing, audio direction and graphic design. It also served as the location for the set of The Women of Brewster Place. Scenes from Beloved were also filmed on a set in Harpo Studios. The studio was sold to developer Sterling Bay in 2014 and was demolished in 2016. The site would be home to the new global headquarters of McDonald's.

The land where the production studio stood once housed the 2nd Regiment Armory that was used as a makeshift morgue for victims of the capsizing of the steamer SS Eastland. The 88,000-square-foot (8,200 m^{2}) facility was renovated and opened in the late 1980s for her show.

== Former divisions ==
=== Harpo Films, Inc. ===
Harpo Films, Inc.
- Type: Division
- Industry: Film production
- Founded: 1993; 33 years ago (as a television film producer) 2014; 12 years ago (as a theatrical film producer)
- Defunct: 2013; 13 years ago (as a television film producer)
- Headquarters: United States
- Area served: Worldwide
- Owner: Harpo, Inc.
- Parent: Harpo Productions

Founded in 1993, Harpo Films, Inc. was the biggest division of Harpo Productions, run by Kate Forte for 18 years. It was an active supplier of motion pictures, developing and producing award-winning features and long-form television programs, including the "Oprah Winfrey Presents" telefilms for the ABC television network. Harpo Films was based in Los Angeles, California.

In late 2008, Harpo Films signed an exclusive output pact with HBO. Previously, Harpo Films had a deal with ABC, which included production of Oprah Winfrey Presents: Mitch Albom's For One More Day. In February 2013, Harpo Films was shut down, citing that "the demand for long-form projects, especially on the broadcast side, has dried out." Many of its employees were expected to move on to Harpo Studios' new scripted series division. A small number of films already in production were released under the Harpo Films banner in 2014. Since then, the label has appeared irregularly on various films for which Winfrey has served as a producer.

==== Feature films ====
- Beloved (1998) (As producer; co-production with Touchstone Pictures and Clinica Estetico; distributed by Buena Vista Pictures Distribution; first theatrical film)
- The Great Debaters (2007) (as producer; distributed by The Weinstein Company & Metro Goldwyn Mayer)
- Precious: Based on the Novel Push by Sapphire (2009) (studio credit with 34th Street Films; produced by Lee Daniels Entertainment and Smokewood Entertainment; distributed by Lionsgate)
- The Hundred-Foot Journey (2014) (As producer; co-production with Touchstone Pictures, DreamWorks Pictures, Reliance Entertainment, Participant Media, ImageNation Abu Dhabi and Amblin Entertainment; distributed by Disney internationally and Mister Smith Entertainment in the EMEA region)
- Selma (under Harpo Productions, 2014) (as producer; co-production with Pathé, Plan B Entertainment, Cloud Eight Films, Ingenious Media and Redgill Selma Productions; distributed by Paramount Pictures in the United States and 20th Century Fox in the United Kingdom)
- The Water Man (2021) (as producer; co-production with ShivHans Pictures and Yoruba Saxon Productions; distributed by RLJE Films in the United States and Netflix internationally)
- The Color Purple (2023) (as producer (credited onscreen as OW Films); co-production with Amblin Entertainment and Scott Sanders Productions; distributed by Warner Bros. Pictures)

==== Television films ====
- Before Women Had Wings (1997, first television film)
- The Wedding (1998)
- David & Lisa (1998)
- Tuesdays with Morrie (1999)
- Amy & Isabelle (2001)
- Their Eyes Were Watching God (2005)
- Oprah Winfrey Presents: Mitch Albom's For One More Day (2007)

=== Harpo Radio, Inc. ===
XM 156 / SR 195 Logo as Oprah and Friends

Harpo Radio, Inc. was the holding company for the Oprah & Friends channel (156 on XM Satellite Radio). Oprah & Friends featured a broad range of daily and weekly programming on a variety of topics including self-improvement, nutrition, fitness, parenting, health, home, finance, and current events hosted by personalities from The Oprah Winfrey Show and O, The Oprah Magazine.

Regular presenters included specialists from a variety of fields, including Dr. Maya Angelou, Marianne Williamson, Dr. Mehmet Oz, Bob Greene, Nate Berkus, Jean Chatzky, Gayle King, Rabbi Shmuley Boteach, and Holly Robinson Peete and Rodney Peete. Oprah, herself, also personally interviewed some of the most influential voices in the spiritual realm on her weekly program, Oprah's Soul Series.

Harpo Radio, Inc. produced and broadcast the Oprah & Friends channel from an XM studio in Chicago, Illinois, from New York, New York. It shut down on January 1, 2015.
