= Kate Forte =

American film producer

Kate Forte was the president of Harpo Films for 18 years until 2013. Before working for Harpo Films, she was a developer of multiple Hallmark Hall of Fame television films.

She won two Producers Guild of America Awards, one in 2000 for producing Tuesdays with Morrie along with Oprah Winfrey and in 2007 for producing The Great Debaters, also along with Winfrey. Forte also won an Emmy Award in 2000 for Tuesdays with Morrie in the category "Outstanding Made For Television Movie".

Forte was let go in 2013 from Harpo films.
