= Tuesdays with Morrie (film) =

1999 American drama film

- British DVD cover
- Genre: Biographical drama
- Based on: Tuesdays with Morrie by Mitch Albom
- Written by: Thomas Rickman
- Directed by: Mick Jackson
- Presented by: Oprah Winfrey
- Starring: Jack Lemmon; Hank Azaria
- Music by: Marco Beltrami
- Country of origin: United States
- Original language: English

Production
- Executive producers: Oprah Winfrey; Kate Forte
- Cinematography: Theo van de Sande
- Editor: Carol Littleton
- Running time: 89 minutes
- Production company: Harpo Films

Original release
- Network: ABC
- Release: December 5, 1999

Tuesdays with Morrie is a 1999 American biographical drama television film directed by Mick Jackson and written by Thomas Rickman, based on journalist Mitch Albom's 1997 memoir. In the film, Albom (Hank Azaria) bonds with his former professor, Morrie Schwartz (Jack Lemmon), who is dying of ALS, over a series of visits.

Tuesdays with Morrie was produced by Oprah Winfrey's Harpo Films, and was filmed in Los Angeles and Santa Clarita, California. It aired on ABC on December 5, 1999, as part of the "Oprah Winfrey Presents" series. It received positive reviews and numerous accolades, including Primetime Emmy Awards for Outstanding Television Movie, Outstanding Lead Actor for Lemmon, and Outstanding Supporting Actor for Azaria; a Directors Guild of America Award for Jackson; and a Writers Guild of America Award and a Humanitas Prize for Rickman.

== Plot ==
In 1995 Detroit, Mitch Albom becomes caught up in his career as a sports commentator and journalist. His girlfriend Janine, a backup singer, feels he never places her as a priority. One evening, while on the phone with Janine, Mitch flips through TV channels and lands on an edition of Nightline where his former professor Morrie Schwartz is being interviewed by Ted Koppel. Morrie discusses his current health and reveals he is dying of amyotrophic lateral sclerosis, often referred to as "Lou Gehrig's disease" or ALS. Morrie, a retired sociology professor from Brandeis University living in Boston, comes on the show to describe his final journey.

Over the following days, Mitch feels bothered he never got a chance to visit his old professor. Feeling moved by the interview, Mitch reaches out for a visit with Morrie after sixteen years of no contact. Morrie loves food, which becomes a regular endeavor with his visits with Mitch. Office hours during university were on Tuesdays, where Morrie would grade papers and critique students' assignments, and Mitch now makes it a habit to visit him every Tuesday. Connie, Morrie's home nurse, is his primary caretaker. After leaving Morrie, Mitch continues working and cannot find a groove with Janine.

Mitch returns and witnesses a living funeral where friends and family come to honor a still alive Morrie, per the latter's request. As the two get reacquainted, they participate in conversations about substantial topics. Morrie divulges on his time as a young boy and how his relationships unfolded between his mother, stepmother, and father. Back home, Mitch continues with his busy career, and while out on a story, he receives a call from Janine breaking up with him.

Another visit prompts Mitch to bring a recording device to capture all of Morrie's pieces of advice and anecdotes about death, love, marriage, family, and relationships. The time spent with Morrie starts to affect Mitch's position at work, he argues with his boss and decides to prioritize his visits with Morrie. Mitch, being so immersed in this new world, asks Connie to teach him skills to aid Morrie when no one else is around. New tasks Mitch learns include helping Morrie in and out of his wheelchair, using his oxygen tank, feeding Morrie, and even providing him with special massages.

Finding meaning in Morrie's advice, Mitch proposes to Janine via letter. She rejects him, but comes along on a visit to Morrie's home. Janine notices a change in Mitch's personality in the way he knows what to do around Morrie from the oxygen tank assistance to cleaning Morrie's crying eyes. Janine and Morrie speak without Mitch in the room. Later, on their way home, Mitch and Janine make up and decide a proper proposal should take place.

On a rainy visit, Mitch brings Morrie food, but learns he has not been able to eat solid foods for some time. Charlotte, Morrie's wife tells Mitch his visits had a great impact on Morrie. Mitch notices how the illness is worsening. They continue to speak about topics like regret, spiritual life, forgiveness, and love. Morrie reiterates that we all, as humans, must love one another or die. He recounts the story of his father's death. Mitch receives a call from Walter, his boss, and they find middle ground to allow Mitch to write again. Mitch takes Janine to the islands and proposes to her there. Back home, Mitch requests to have all of his Tuesdays off to continue his visits with Morrie.

On a snowy visit, Mitch asks Morrie what a perfect day would be like. According to Morrie, it would be one spent with friends, family, food, dancing, and choosing his burial site. Morrie asks Mitch to visit once he has passed. Filled with emotion, Mitch cries and hugs Morrie. Mitch then promises to come back next Tuesday. Morrie dies Saturday morning. Charlotte keeps his funeral small, and all the people in his perfect day are included. The funeral is held on a Tuesday.

== Cast ==
- Jack Lemmon as Morrie Schwartz
- Hank Azaria as Mitch Albom
- Wendy Moniz as Janine, Mitch's girlfriend
- Caroline Aaron as Connie, Morrie's home nurse
- Bonnie Bartlett as Charlotte Schwartz, Morrie's wife
- Aaron Lustig as Rabbi Al Axelrod
- Bruce Nozick as Mr. Schwartz
- Ivo Cutzarida as Armand
- John Carroll Lynch as Walter Moran, Mitch's boss
- Kyle Sullivan as Young Morrie
- Dan Thiel as Shawn Daley
- Christian Meoli as Aldo
- John Billingsley as Sports Fan #1

== Production and release ==
The film was produced by Oprah Winfrey's Harpo Films. After reading the memoir, Winfrey promoted it on her television show and lobbied for the film rights. Albom doubted the film would be made: "There are no car crashes, no explosions, no intricate terrorist plots. It's just two people talking. What producer in their right mind would want to take that on?"

The producers believed that a straight adaptation of the memoir would be "limp and static", so the story was changed to place more emphasis on Albom, including scenes with his girlfriend and at his workplace. According to executive producer Kate Forte, director Mick Jackson was inspired by the German film Run Lola Run to quicken the film's pace. Filming took place in Los Angeles and Santa Clarita, California.

Tuesdays with Morrie aired on ABC on December 5, 1999, as part of the "Oprah Winfrey Presents" series.

== Reception ==
On the review aggregator website Rotten Tomatoes, 71% of 7 critics' reviews are positive.

=== Ratings ===
The film brought in a 15.2/22 rating/share, and was watched by 22.5 million viewers, ranking as the most watched program that week.

=== Awards and nominations ===
Year	Award	Category	Nominee(s)	Result	Ref.
2000	Cinema Audio Society Awards	Outstanding Achievement in Sound Mixing for Television – Movies of the Week and Mini-Series	Richard Van Dyke, Dan Hiland, and Gary D. Rogers	Nominated	
2000	Directors Guild of America Awards	Outstanding Directorial Achievement in Movies for Television or Miniseries	Mick Jackson	Won	
2000	Golden Globe Awards	Best Actor – Miniseries or Television Film	Jack Lemmon	Nominated	
2000	Golden Reel Awards	Best Sound Editing – Television Movies and Specials – Dialogue & ADR	Bob Newlan, David Hankins, John Green, Sonya Henry, and Larry Goeb	Nominated	
2000	Golden Reel Awards	Best Sound Editing – Television Movies and Specials (including Mini-Series) – Music	Chris McGeary	Nominated	
2000	Humanitas Prize	90 Minute or Longer Network or Syndicated Television	Thomas Rickman	Won	
2000	Online Film & Television Association Awards	Best Motion Picture Made for Television		Nominated	
2000	Online Film & Television Association Awards	Best Actor in a Motion Picture or Miniseries	Jack Lemmon	Won	
2000	Online Film & Television Association Awards	Best Supporting Actor in a Motion Picture or Miniseries	Hank Azaria	Won	
2000	Online Film & Television Association Awards	Best Direction of a Motion Picture or Miniseries	Mick Jackson	Nominated	
2000	Online Film & Television Association Awards	Best Writing of a Motion Picture or Miniseries	Thomas Rickman	Nominated	
2000	Online Film & Television Association Awards	Best Ensemble in a Motion Picture or Miniseries		Nominated	
2000	Primetime Emmy Awards	Outstanding Made for Television Movie	Kate Forte, Jennifer Ogden, and Oprah Winfrey	Won	
2000	Primetime Emmy Awards	Outstanding Lead Actor in a Miniseries or a Movie	Jack Lemmon	Won	
2000	Primetime Emmy Awards	Outstanding Supporting Actor in a Miniseries or a Movie	Hank Azaria	Won	
2000	Primetime Emmy Awards	Outstanding Single Camera Picture Editing for a Miniseries, Movie or a Special	Carol Littleton	Won	
2000	Primetime Emmy Awards	Outstanding Sound Mixing for a Miniseries, Movie or a Special	Michael C. Casper, Daniel Leahy, and Jim Tanenbaum	Nominated	
2000	Producers Guild of America Awards	Outstanding Producer of Long-Form Television	Oprah Winfrey and Kate Forte	Won	
2000	Screen Actors Guild Awards	Outstanding Performance by a Male Actor in a Miniseries or Television Movie	Hank Azaria	Nominated	
2000	Screen Actors Guild Awards	Outstanding Performance by a Male Actor in a Miniseries or Television Movie	Jack Lemmon	Won	
2000	TV Guide Awards	Favorite TV Movie or Miniseries		Nominated	
2001	Writers Guild of America Awards	Long Form – Adapted	Thomas Rickman; Based on the book by Mitch Albom	Won (Note: Tied with John Logan for RKO 281.)	
