= Morrie Schwartz =

American sociologist (1916–1995)

- Born: Morris S. Schwartz; December 20, 1916; New York City, New York, U.S.
- Died: November 4, 1995 (aged 78); Newton, Massachusetts, U.S.
- Occupation: Professor at Brandeis University
- Spouse: Charlotte Schwartz
- Children: Robert and Jonathan Schwartz

Morris S. Schwartz (December 20, 1916 – November 4, 1995) was an American professor of sociology at Brandeis University and an author. He was the subject of the best-selling book Tuesdays with Morrie, written by Mitch Albom, a former student of Schwartz. He was portrayed by Jack Lemmon in the 1999 television film adaptation of the book.

== Personal life ==
Schwartz was the son of Charlie Schwartz, a Russian-Jewish immigrant who emigrated from Russia to escape the army. Schwartz's mother died when he was eight years old, and his brother David developed polio at a young age. His father would eventually marry a Romanian woman named Eva Schneiderman. Later in Schwartz's life, his father suffered a fatal heart attack after fleeing a mugging. Schwartz came from a Jewish family, but as an adult he adopted multiple beliefs from a variety of different religions. He completed doctoral work at the University of Chicago.

Schwartz had two sons with his wife Charlotte, Robert and Jonathan.

Schwartz was a 77-year-old sociology professor at Brandeis University when he was diagnosed with amyotrophic lateral sclerosis (ALS). He died in November 1995, a year and three months after being diagnosed with the disease.

== Tuesdays with Morrie ==
Schwartz achieved national prominence posthumously after being featured as the subject of Mitch Albom's 1997 best-selling memoir, Tuesdays with Morrie. Albom had been a student of Schwartz's at Brandeis University, and years later had seen Schwartz on the television program Nightline. After Albom phoned Schwartz, he made a series of trips to visit him in the final weeks of Schwartz's life as he was gradually overtaken by ALS. The book recounts the fourteen visits Albom made, their conversations, Schwartz's lectures, and his life experiences.

The book was adapted into a television film in 1999, starring Jack Lemmon as Schwartz.

== Works ==
- with Alfred H. Stanton: The Mental Hospital: A Study of Institutional Participation in Psychiatric Illness and Treatment. Basic Books 1950, ISBN 978-1-59147-617-7 (2009 edition)
- with Charlotte Green Schwartz: Social Approaches to Mental Patient Care. Columbia University Press 1964
- with Emmy Lanning Shockley: The Nurse and the Mental Patient: a Study in Interpersonal Relations. Wiley 1966, ISBN 978-0-471-76610-0
- Letting Go: Morrie's Reflections on Living While Dying. Walker & Company 1996, ISBN 978-0-8027-1315-5
- Morrie: In His Own Words. Delta Publishing 1997, ISBN 0385318790
