= One More Day =

One More Day may refer to:

== Music ==
- One More Day (album), a 2001 album by Diamond Rio
  - "One More Day" (Diamond Rio song), a 2000 song
- "One More Day" (Chocolat song), 2012
- "One More Day" (Eldrine song), 2011
- "One More Day" (New Edition song), 1997
- One More Day, a 2003 EP by Stephen Speaks
- "One More Day", a song by Rocket Club
- "One More Day", a song by Stellar* from Magic Line
- "One More Day", a song from the 1957 film Jailhouse Rock
- "One More Day", a song by 10 Years from Feeding the Wolves
- "One More Day", a song by Sistar featuring Giorgio Moroder
- "One More Day (Stay with Me)", a 2014 song by Example from the album Live Life Living
- "One More Day (Rock and Roll Me Over)", a traditional river or sea shanty
- "One More Day", a song by Ava (Éabha McMahon)
- "One More Day", a song by Mushroomhead from XIII
- "One More Day", a song by Sentenced from Crimson
- "One More Day", a song by We Came as Romans from Darkbloom
- "One More Day", a song by Angelic Upstarts from Last Tango in Moscow
- “One More Day”, a song by Descendents from Cool to Be You

== Other media ==
- "One More Day" (Blue Heelers), an episode of Blue Heelers
- One More Day (comics), a 2007 Marvel Comics story arc

== See also ==
- For One More Day, a 2006 novel by Mitch Albom
  - Oprah Winfrey Presents: Mitch Albom's For One More Day, a 2007 television film adaptation of Albom's novel
