= The Golden Compass (soundtrack) =

Soundtrack album by Alexandre Desplat
- Released: December 11, 2007
- Recorded: 2007
- Studio: Abbey Road; AIR
- Genre: Film soundtrack
- Length: 73:49
- Label: New Line
- Producer: Alexandre Desplat

Alexandre Desplat chronology
Mr. Magorium's Wonder Emporium (2007)	The Golden Compass (2007)	Afterwards (2008)

Singles from The Golden Compass
- 1. "Lyra" Released: November 20, 2007

The Golden Compass (Original Motion Picture Soundtrack) is the soundtrack to the 2007 film The Golden Compass directed by Chris Weitz. It features musical score composed by Alexandre Desplat and an original song "Lyra" written and performed by Kate Bush. The soundtrack was released through New Line Records on December 11, 2007.

== Development ==
The Golden Compass marked Desplat's maiden collaboration with Weitz who would later renew their association for The Twilight Saga: New Moon (2009), A Better Life (2011) and Operation Finale (2018). Desplat had intended on composing for an epic film, where he could play wide and deep, and has big lyrical themes. When he read the 1995 novel Northern Lights by Philip Pullman, which the film is based on, "it was obvious that there was a lot for a composer to imagine—the adventurous colors that you can create with an orchestra, but also an otherworldly feel" which was further experimented in an ethnic way. He described Weitz as a "strong, very dedicated, cultural person" and always surrounds with experienced and creative technicians.

Desplat assembled a 120-piece orchestra and 60-member vocal choir at the Abbey Road Studios in London and took nearly four months to record two hours of music for the film. The thematic approach for each character has been a complex one as all of them were ambiguous. He had nearly composed thirteen themes for the trilogy which are based on Lyra, Roger, Iorek, Ragnar, Lee Scoresby, Billy Costa, the kids, the Gyptians, the Gobblers and Mrs. Coulter, and the main theme which he added on G minor and A major. The main theme was extremely layered which wanted to recognize the compass, and to be haunting and spiritual. To achieve this, he used Tibetan bowls, gongs, vibraphone, song bell, violin harmonics, electric cello to develop a complex sound. "The Travelling Theme" also featured the same chords as the main theme which Desplat blended them to produce a third theme. At times the score resembled Maurice Jarre's work for Lawrence of Arabia (1962), which Weitz described as an inspiration.

For Ragnar Sturlusson, he used six pianos for recording the theme to provide "a sense of strangeness, immensity, another worldly place". While discussing musical ideas with Weitz, Desplat decided that he would use metal instruments for the palace of the bears, where the piano served as a metal percussion as it used metal strings. From the onset, he used the muted brass in place of a bass, to provide a metallic sound that was "weird, spatial, and electronic". The ice bear combat sequence was the intense composition for Desplat, as he wanted it to make it more emotional and epic. He used strings to do waves, movements, arpeggios and scales, which "created a sense of movement, acceleration, and even sometimes the sense of a dance". The use of brass, percussion and strings were used to provide the epic and magical elements, while the low brass, timpani and Gran cassa were played in low tone after Ragnar's death.

Most of the choir members were men, as bass, baritone, tenor and countertenor vocals and most of the men were singing in higher register. At certain sequences, he used boys instead of women, that resulted him to utilize the choir to support the orchestra. Besides the orchestra, he used several ethnic instruments such as mandolin, bağlama, Tibetan bowls, gongs, saxophone, ethnic flute, records, chance flute, cimbalom, electric cello and Mongolian cello. The cello is played in such a way that it performs a harmonic glissando and blends with a Tuvan throat singer with a chorus pedal.

== Reception ==
James Leonard of AllMusic described the score as atmospheric as his work for The Painted Veil (2006) but weirder and otherworldly, and called it as "a lovely aural souvenir from the film". Christian Clemmensen of Filmtracks wrote "The Golden Compass remains a score better built for intellectual appreciation rather than mainstream enjoyment." Sean Wilson of MFiles wrote "Overtly it is very much a generic fantasy score in a similar mode to other big budget fantasy movies such as The Chronicles of Narnia. On the other hand fans of the composer will notice that the composer's style (particularly his idiosyncratic orchestration) gives the score that extra stylistic interest, though in a much more subtle way than John Williams' instantly recognizable style in Harry Potter with its melodic emphasis." Todd McCarthy of Variety wrote "Alexandre Desplat's active score, while not his most distinctive, remains above the norm for this sort of project." Manohla Dargis of The New York Times and Kirk Honeycutt of The Hollywood Reporter called it as epic and melancholic. Dana Stevens of Slate wrote "the swirling Alexandre Desplat score was making me drowsy".

== Track listing ==
The Golden Compass (Original Motion Picture Soundtrack) track listing
No.	Title	Length
1.	"The Golden Compass"	2:20
2.	"Sky Ferry"	2:42
3.	"Letters from Bolvangar"	2:32
4.	"Lyra, Roger and Billy"	1:28
5.	"Mrs. Coulter"	5:19
6.	"Lyra Escapes"	3:43
7.	"The Magisterium"	1:58
8.	"Dust"	1:09
9.	"Serafina Pekkala"	1:49
10.	"Lee Scoresby's Airship Adventure"	1:18
11.	"Iorek Byrnison"	5:27
12.	"Lord Faa, King of the Gyptians"	2:18
13.	"The Golden Monkey"	2:03
14.	"Riding Iorek"	4:39
15.	"Samoyed Attack"	1:21
16.	"Lord Asriel"	2:08
17.	"Ragnar Sturlusson"	6:19
18.	"Ice Bear Combat"	2:16
19.	"Iorek's Victory"	1:27
20.	"The Ice Bridge"	1:32
21.	"Rescuing the Children"	2:19
22.	"Intercision"	2:48
23.	"Mother"	3:34
24.	"Battle with the Tartars"	4:29
25.	"Epilogue"	3:32
26.	"Lyra" (written and performed by Kate Bush)	3:19
Total length:		73:49

== Accolades ==
Accolades for The Golden Compass (Original Motion Picture Soundtrack)
Award	Category	Nominee	Result	Ref.
International Film Music Critics Association	Best Original Score for a Fantasy/Science Fiction Film	Alexandre Desplat	Won	
International Film Music Critics Association	Film Score of the Year	Alexandre Desplat	Nominated	
Satellite Awards	Best Original Song	Kate Bush (for the song "Lyra")	Nominated	
World Soundtrack Awards	Soundtrack Composer of the Year	Alexandre Desplat	Nominated	
