= Summer Jam =

Summer Jam may refer to:

- Summer Jam (festival), an annual hip-hop fest held in East Rutherford, New Jersey
- Summer Jam at Watkins Glen, a 1973 rock festival
- Summer Jam (The Underdog Project song)
- Summer Jam (R.I.O. song)
- Twin Cities Summer Jam
- "Summer Jam", a song by Jake Owen from the deluxe edition of Days of Gold, 2013

== See also ==
- Summerjam, a European reggae festival
