= Mr. Magorium's Wonder Emporium (soundtrack) =

2007 film soundtrack album

Mr. Magorium Wonder's Emporium (Original Motion Picture Soundtrack)

Film score by Alexandre Desplat and Aaron Zigman
- Released: November 13, 2007
- Recorded: 2007
- Studio: AIR Studios, London; Newman Scoring Stage, 20th Century Fox Studios, Los Angeles
- Genre: Film score
- Length: 59:17
- Label: Varèse Sarabande
- Producer: Aaron Zigman

Alexandre Desplat chronology
Ségo et Sarko sont dans un bateau (2007)	Mr. Magorium's Wonder Emporium (2007)	The Golden Compass (2007)

Aaron Zigman chronology
Martian Child (2007)	Mr. Magorium's Wonder Emporium (2007)	Step Up 2: The Streets (2008)

Mr. Magorium Wonder's Emporium (Original Motion Picture Soundtrack) is the film score to the 2007 film Mr. Magorium's Wonder Emporium directed by Zach Helm starring Dustin Hoffman, Natalie Portman, Jason Bateman and Zach Mills. The original score is composed by Alexandre Desplat and Aaron Zigman and released through Varèse Sarabande on November 13, 2007.

== Background ==
Alexandre Desplat was initially attached to write the score for Mr. Magorium Wonder's Emporium and had wrote the original themes for the film. However, due to the film's post-production delay, Desplat's commitments on The Golden Compass (2007) overlapped with this project. Hence, prioritising the former, Aaron Zigman joined the film at the last minute and wrote the rest of the themes, that combined with Desplat's music. Over 70 minutes of music had been written within a span of three weeks, which Zigman found it to be challenging. The score was released through Varèse Sarabande on November 13, 2007.

== Reception ==
Jonathan Broxton of Movie Music UK wrote "Once again, Alexandre Desplat has proven himself to be one of the best composers working in film anywhere in the world today. More importantly, though, Aaron Zigman is gradually beginning to impress me more and more. From The Notebook (2004) and John Q (2002), Flicka (2006), and Bridge to Terabithia (2007) earlier this year, Zigman is developing into a composer of note in his own right, and is worth watching in future. The collaboration of these two men on Mr. Magorium’s Wonder Emporium is really excellent; this score comes highly recommended."

Thomas Glorieux of Maintitles wrote "Overall, Mr. Magorium's Wonder Emporium is an excellent buy, a wonderful addition to a score fan's library, and one that you will return to time and time again. Do not believe your first impressions, or you will be deceived. This is a children's film, but an adults' score. This is pure, unadulterated, raw emotional intensity that is not to be found in too many of today's scores. And aside from that, it's a heck of a lot of fun. Highly recommended." Tom Hoover of Scorenotes wrote "This collaboration between Desplat and Zigman was quite a success. Their music offers a touch of imagination and fantasy and should please most film music fans."

Jason Ankeny of AllMusic wrote "the individual themes originate from such different perspectives that the score as a whole lacks cohesion—at nearly one hour in length, it's a sometimes frustrating listening experience, and much less than the sum of its myriad parts." Kirk Honeycutt of The Hollywood Reporter said that "Helping to set a pace is the lush score by Alexandre Desplat and Aaron Zigman". Brian Lowry of Variety wrote that the film is "buoyantly punctuated by Alexandre Desplat and Aaron Zigman’s score".

== Track listing ==
No.	Title	Length
1.	"Main Title"	2:44
2.	"Mahoney's Debut"	2:39
3.	"Good Morning"	1:24
4.	"Night Time"	0:47
5.	"Kermit"	1:38
6.	"Dodge Ball"	1:53
7.	"Bellini"	0:59
8.	"Temper Tantrum Part 1"	2:30
9.	"The Wall's Breath"	0:42
10.	"The Flight of Magorium"	4:45
11.	"Toy Store Jam"	1:05
12.	"Temper Tantrum Part 2"	1:17
13.	"Block of Wood"	1:53
14.	"The Funeral"	2:42
15.	"Great Wisdom"	1:21
16.	"Sparkle"	2:01
17.	"Triscadecaphobia"	1:20
18.	"Magorium's Apartment"	1:02
19.	"Dancing"	1:34
20.	"Your Friend"	1:47
21.	"Last Pair"	1:16
22.	"Just Trying to Help"	1:02
23.	"Eric Builds Lincoln"	1:13
24.	"Eric and Mutant"	1:58
25.	"A Substantial Offer"	1:33
26.	"The Euphonium"	0:42
27.	"The Stare"	0:36
28.	"I'm Stuck"	1:13
29.	"You're Hired"	1:31
30.	"Tomorrow"	1:53
31.	"You Have to Live"	0:41
32.	"A New Chapter"	1:30
33.	"I'm Leaving"	0:40
34.	"Delusional"	0:38
35.	"Magic Magnet"	1:35
36.	"Finale"	2:40
37.	"Love the World You Find"	2:33
Total length:		59:17

== Personnel ==
Credits adapted from liner notes:

- Music composer – Aaron Zigman, Alexandre Desplat
- Music producer – Aaron Zigman
- Recording – Stephen Kempster
- Mixing – Michael Stern
- Mastering – Patricia Sullivan Fourstar
- Copyist – Steve Juliani
- Executive producer – Jim Garavente, Lindsay Fellows, Richard Gladstein, Zach Helm
- Executive album producer – Robert Townson
- Executive in charge of music – Lindsay Fellows

Orchestra

- Orchestra – The Hollywood Studio Symphony
- Orchestrators – Aaron Zigman, Alexandre Desplat, Bill Reichenbach, Brad Warnaar, Bruce Babcock, Dan Higgins, Gernot Wolfgang, Jerry Hey, Patrick Kirst
- Conductor – Aaron Zigman
- Contractor – Peter Rotter, Sandy De Crescent
- Concertmaster – Roger Wilkie

Instruments

- Bass – Ann Atkinson, Christian Kollgaard, Drew Dembowski, Michael Valerio, Nico Abondolo, Edward Meares
- Bassoon – Judy Farmer, Michael O'Donovan
- Cello – Antony Cooke, Armen Ksajikian, Cecelia Tsan, Christina Soule, Erika Duke-Kirkpatrick, Paul Cohen, Paula Hochhalter, Timothy Landauer, Trevor Handy, Andrew Shulman
- Clarinet – Phil O'Connor, Daniel Higgins
- Flute – Geraldine Rotella, Susan Greenberg
- Guitar – George Doering
- Harp – Katie Kirkpatrick, Maria Casale, Jo Ann Turovsky
- Horn – Daniel Kelley, David Duke, Phillip Yao, Richard Todd, Steven Becknell, Brian O'Connor
- Oboe – Leslie H. Reed, Phillip Ayling
- Percussion – Alan Estes, Brian Kilgore, Daniel Greco, Peter Limonick, Wade Culbreath, Robert Zimmitti
- Trombone – William Reichenbach, Phillip Teele, William Booth, Charles Loper
- Trumpet – Jon Lewis, Larry Hall, Malcolm Mc Nab, Gary Grant
- Tuba – James Self
- Viola – Andrew Duckles, Cassandra Richburg, David Walther, Keith Greene, Marlow Fisher, Matthew Funes, Rick Gerding, Roland Kato, Shanti Randall, Shawn Mann, Thomas Diener, Victoria Miskolczy, Brian Dembow
- Violin – Aimee Kreston, Alan Grunfeld, Alyssa Park, Amy Hershberger, Anatoly Rosinsky, Armen Anassian, Caroline Campbell, Dimitrie Leivici, Eric J. Hosler, Henry Gronnier, Irina Voloshina, Ishani Bhoola, Josefina Vergara, Julie Ann Gigante, Katia Popov, Kenneth Yerke, Kevin Connolly, Marc Sazer, Marina Manukian, Natalie Leggett, Neil Samples, Phillip Levy, Rafael Rishik, Sara Parkins, Songa Lee, Sungil Lee, Tamara Hatwan, Tereza Stanislav, Jacqueline Brand

== Accolades ==
Awards	Category	Recipient(s)	Result	Ref.
International Film Music Critics Association	Best Original Score for a Fantasy/Science Fiction Film	Alexandre Desplat and Aaron Zigman	Nominated	
