= 12th Satellite Awards =

Annual film, television, and media awards

- Date: December 16, 2007

Highlights
- Best drama film: No Country for Old Men
- Best comedy/musical film: Juno
- Best television drama: Dexter
- Best television musical/comedy: Pushing Daisies
- Best director: Joel Coen and Ethan Coen for No Country for Old Men

The 12th Satellite Awards, honoring the best in film and television of 2007, were given on December 16, 2007.

== Special achievement awards ==
Auteur Award (for his work on the film The Diving Bell and the Butterfly) – Julian Schnabel

Mary Pickford Award (for outstanding contribution to the entertainment industry) – Kathy Bates

Nikola Tesla Award (for his visual effects in films, especially with computer digital rendering and compositing) – Dennis Muren

== Motion picture winners and nominees ==
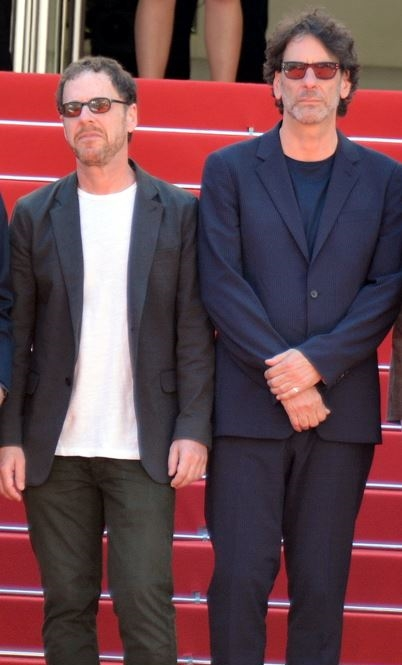
Joel Coen and Ethan Coen, Best Director winners

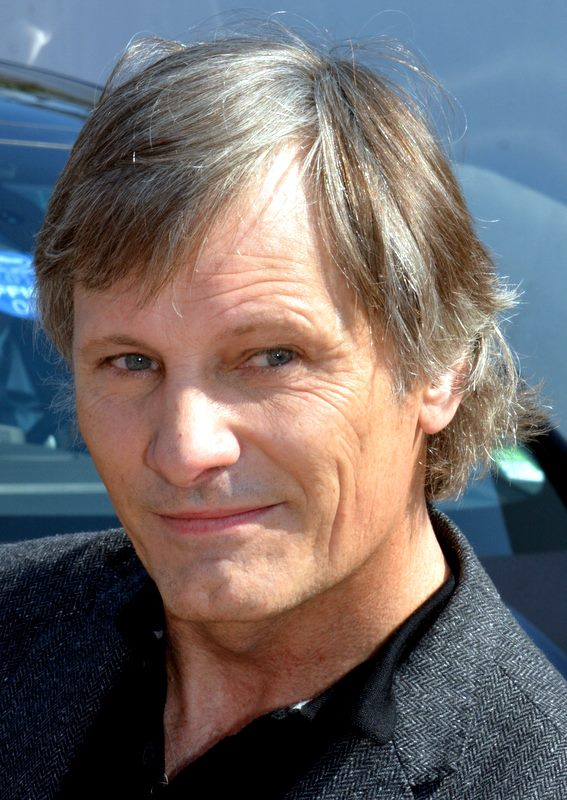
Viggo Mortensen, Best Actor in a Motion Picture – Drama winner

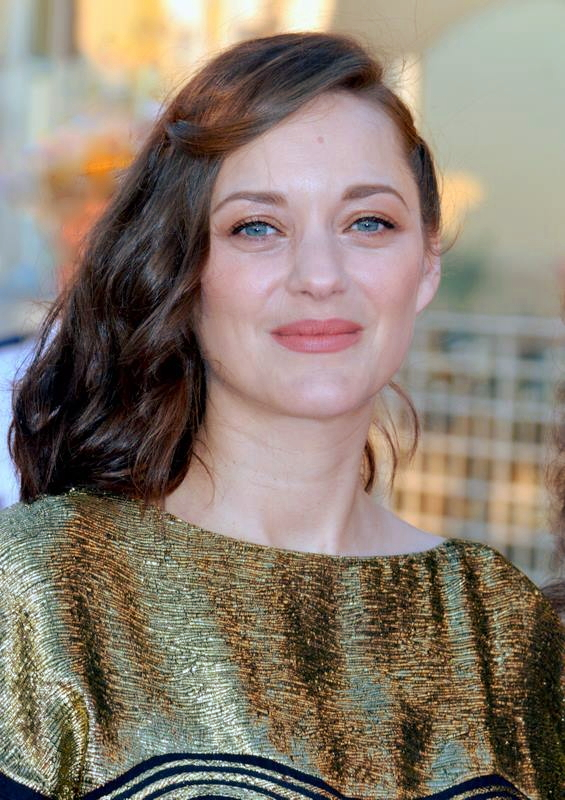
Marion Cotillard, Best Actress in a Motion Picture – Drama winner

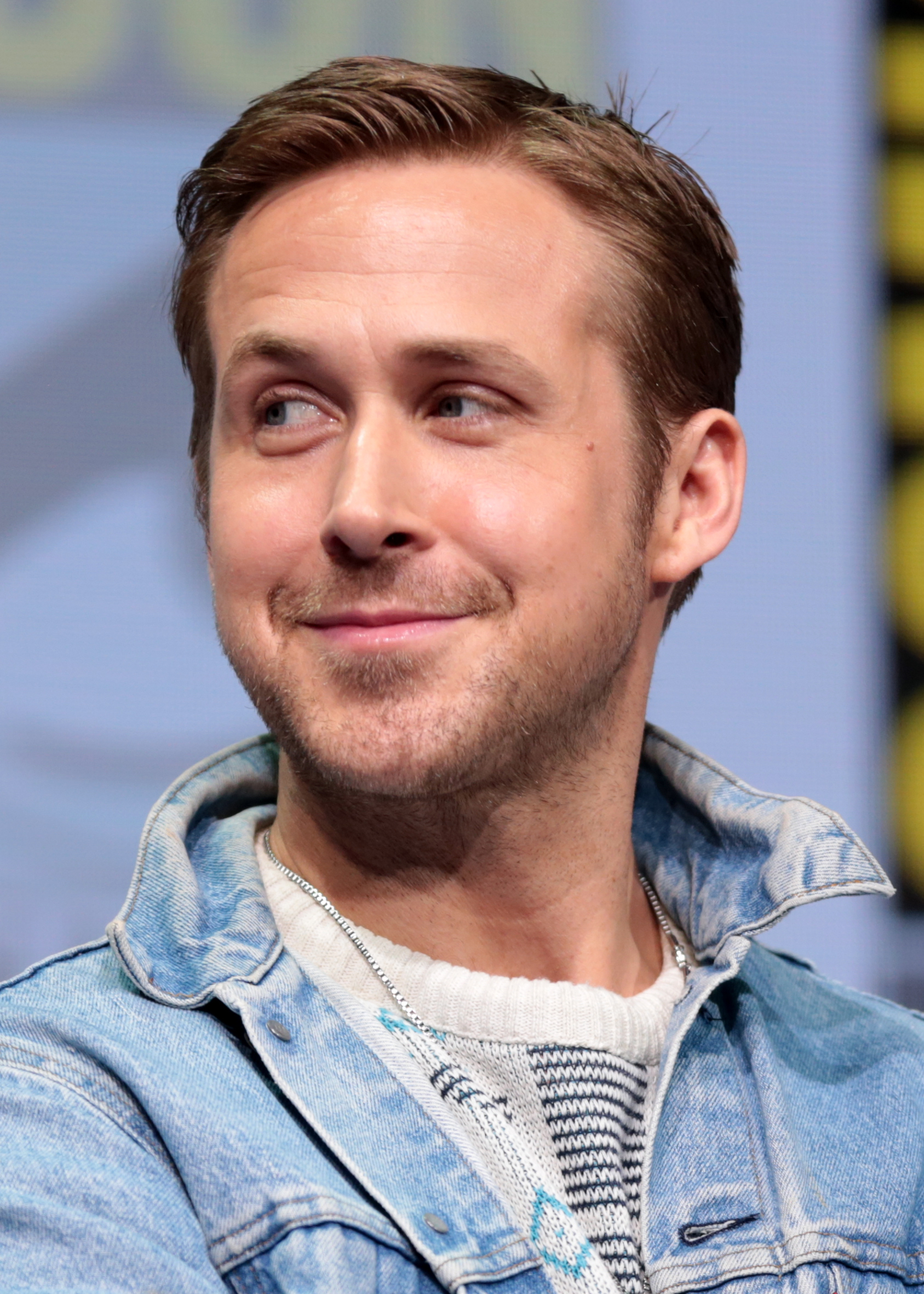
Ryan Gosling, Best Actor in a Motion Picture – Comedy or Musical winner

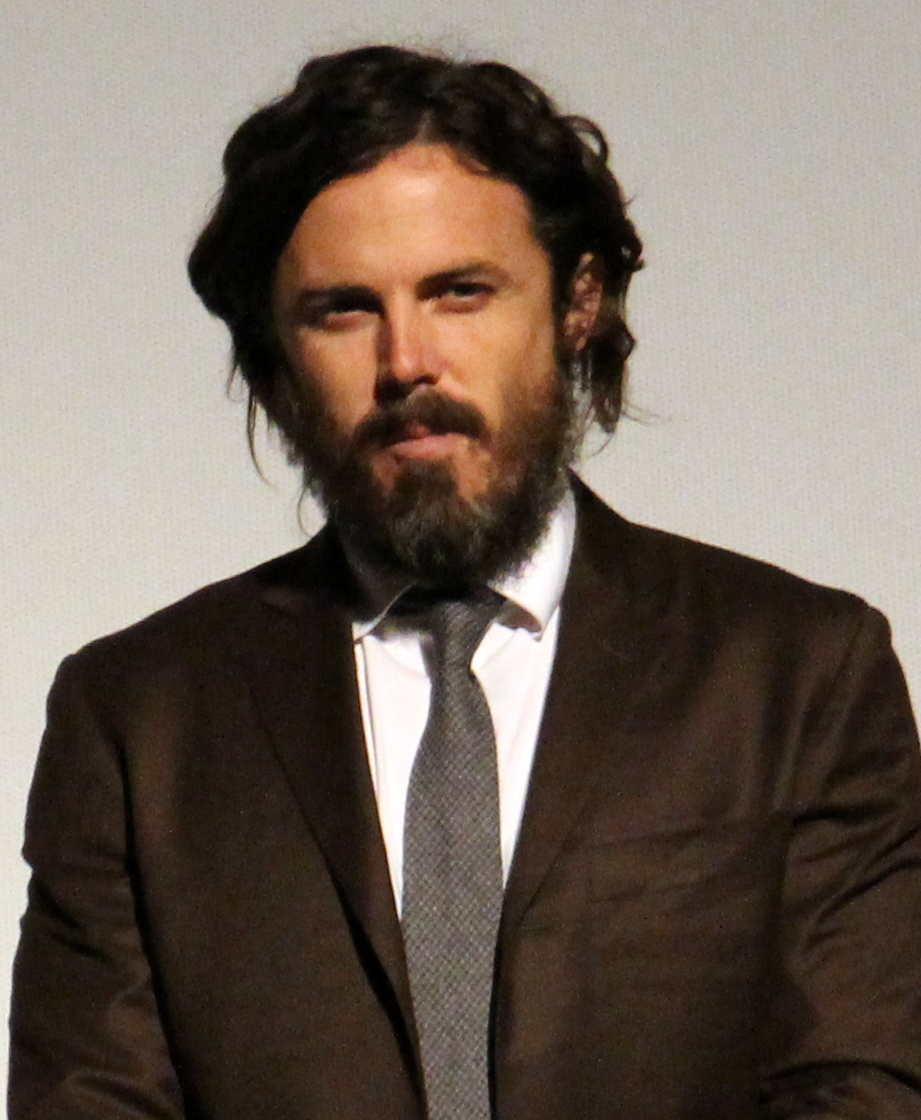
Casey Affleck, Best Supporting Actor in a Motion Picture co-winner

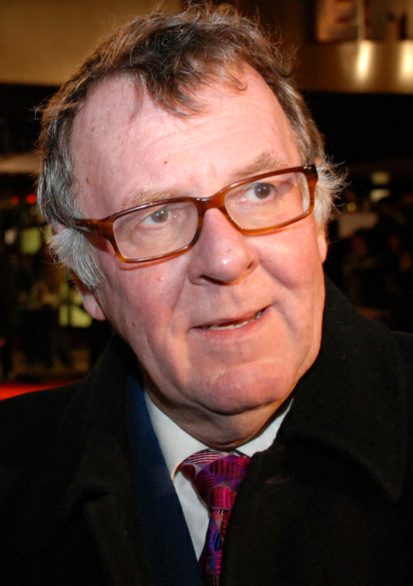
Tom Wilkinson, Best Supporting Actor in a Motion Picture co-winner

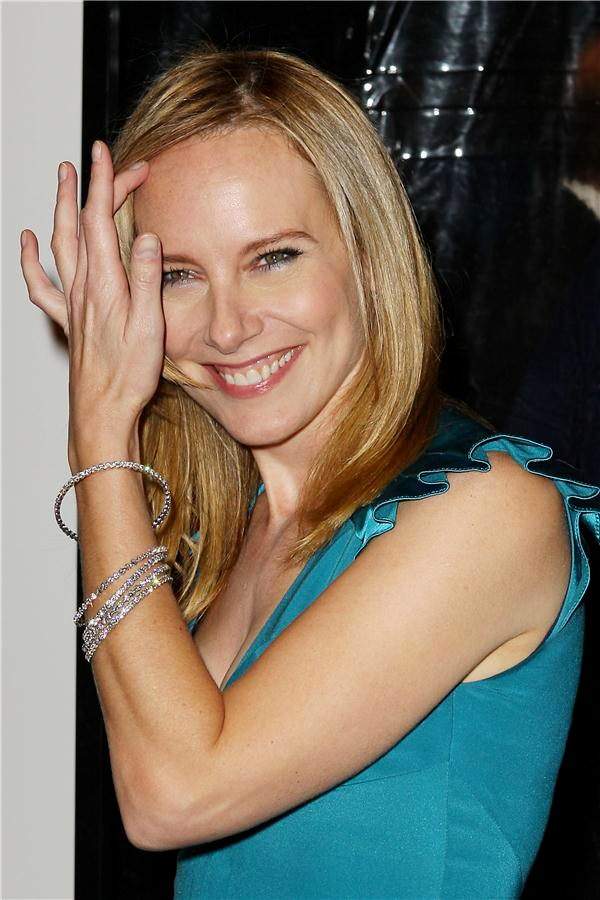
Amy Ryan, Best Supporting Actress in a Motion Picture winner

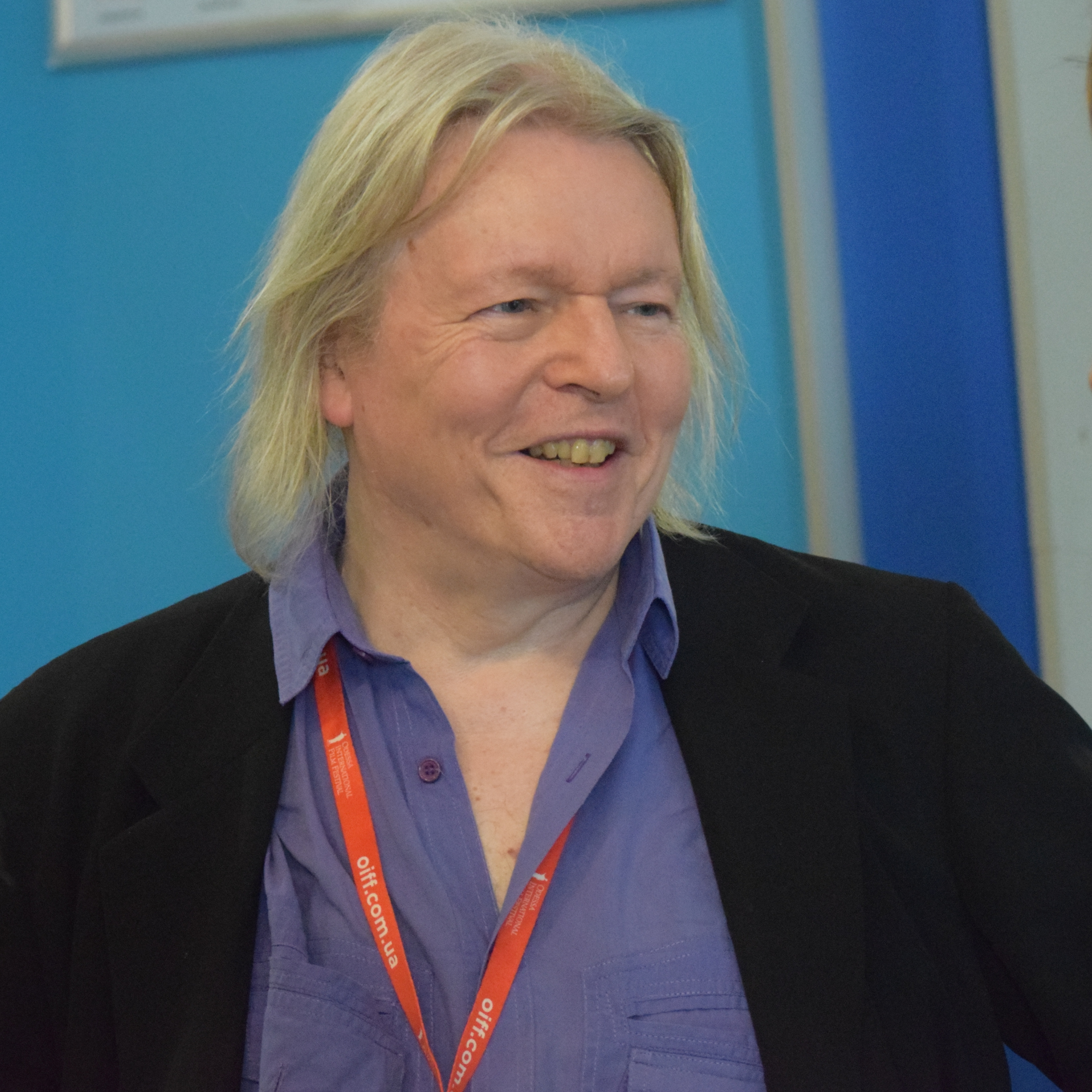
Christopher Hampton, Best Adapted Screenplay winner

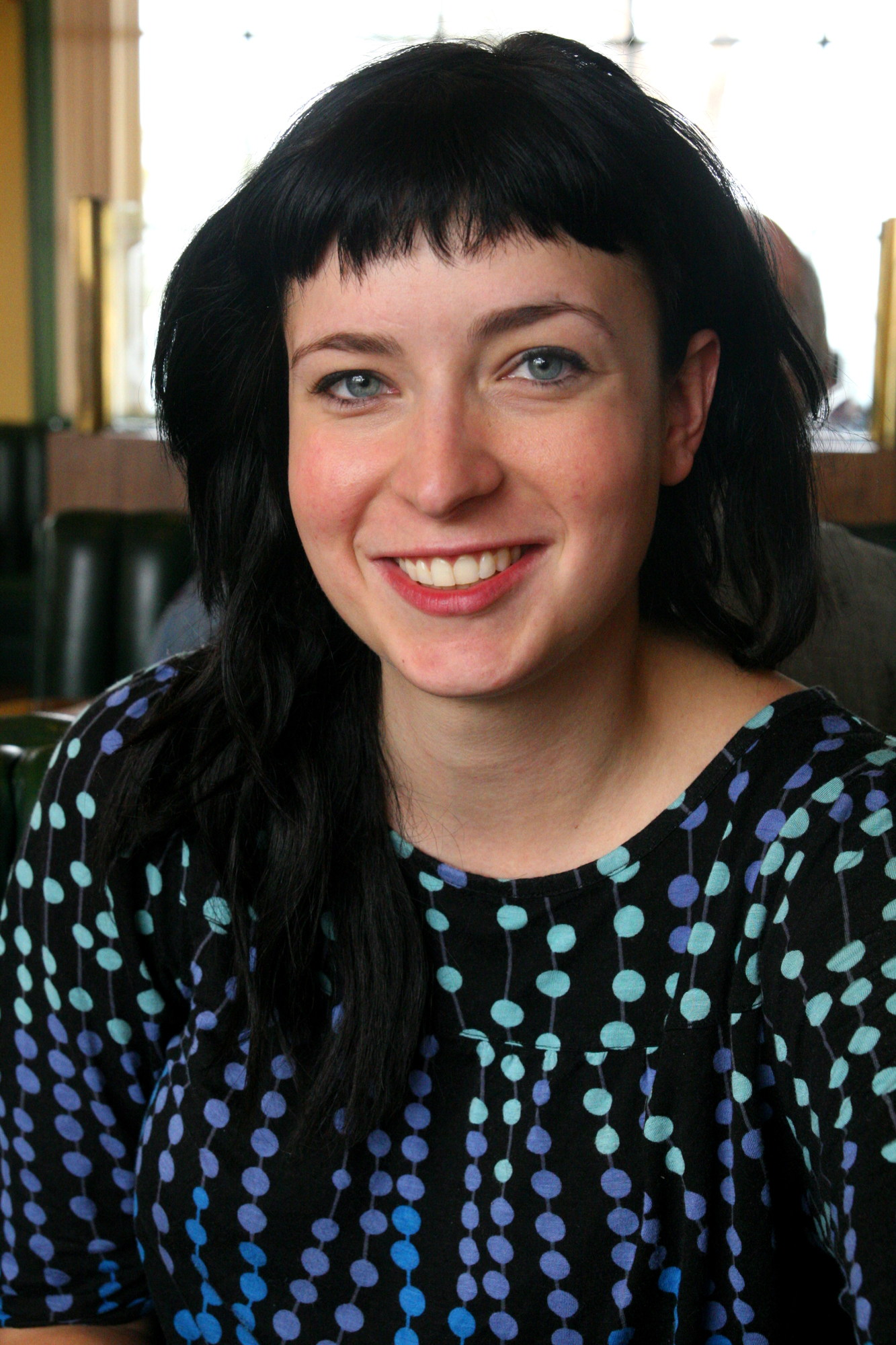
Diablo Cody, Best Original Screenplay winner

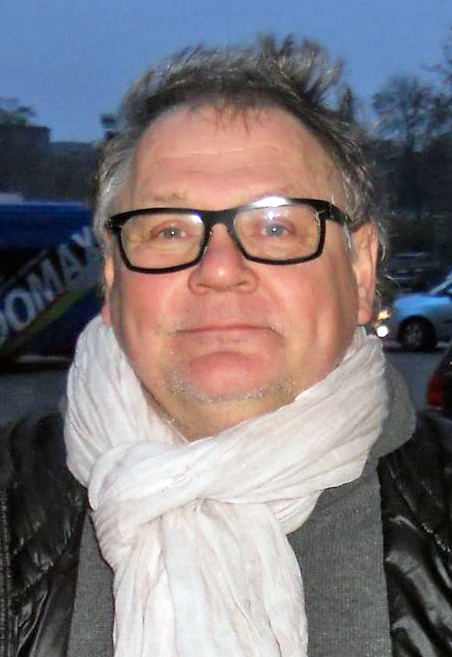
Janusz Kamiński, Best Cinematography winner

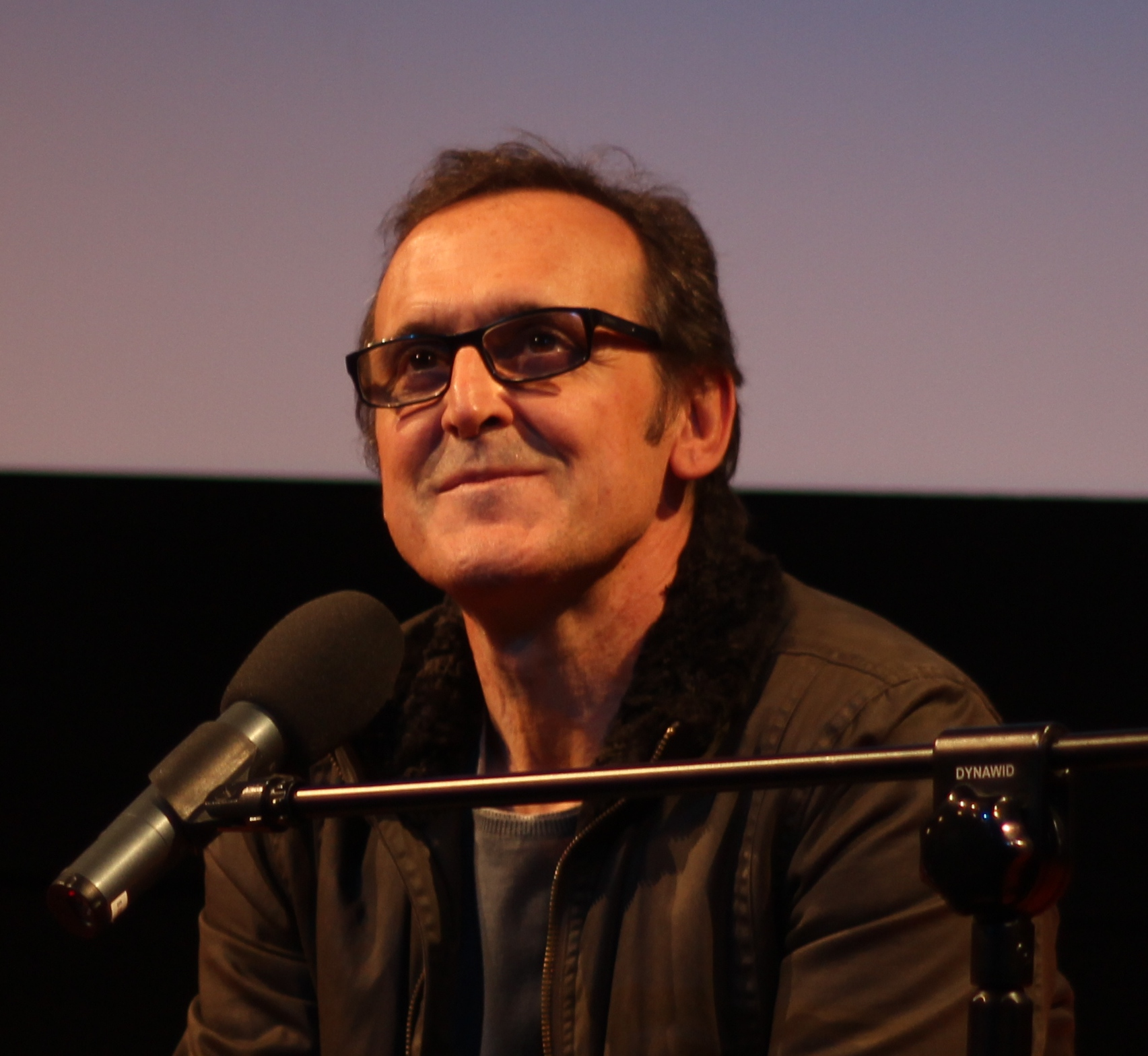
Alberto Iglesias, Best Original Score winner

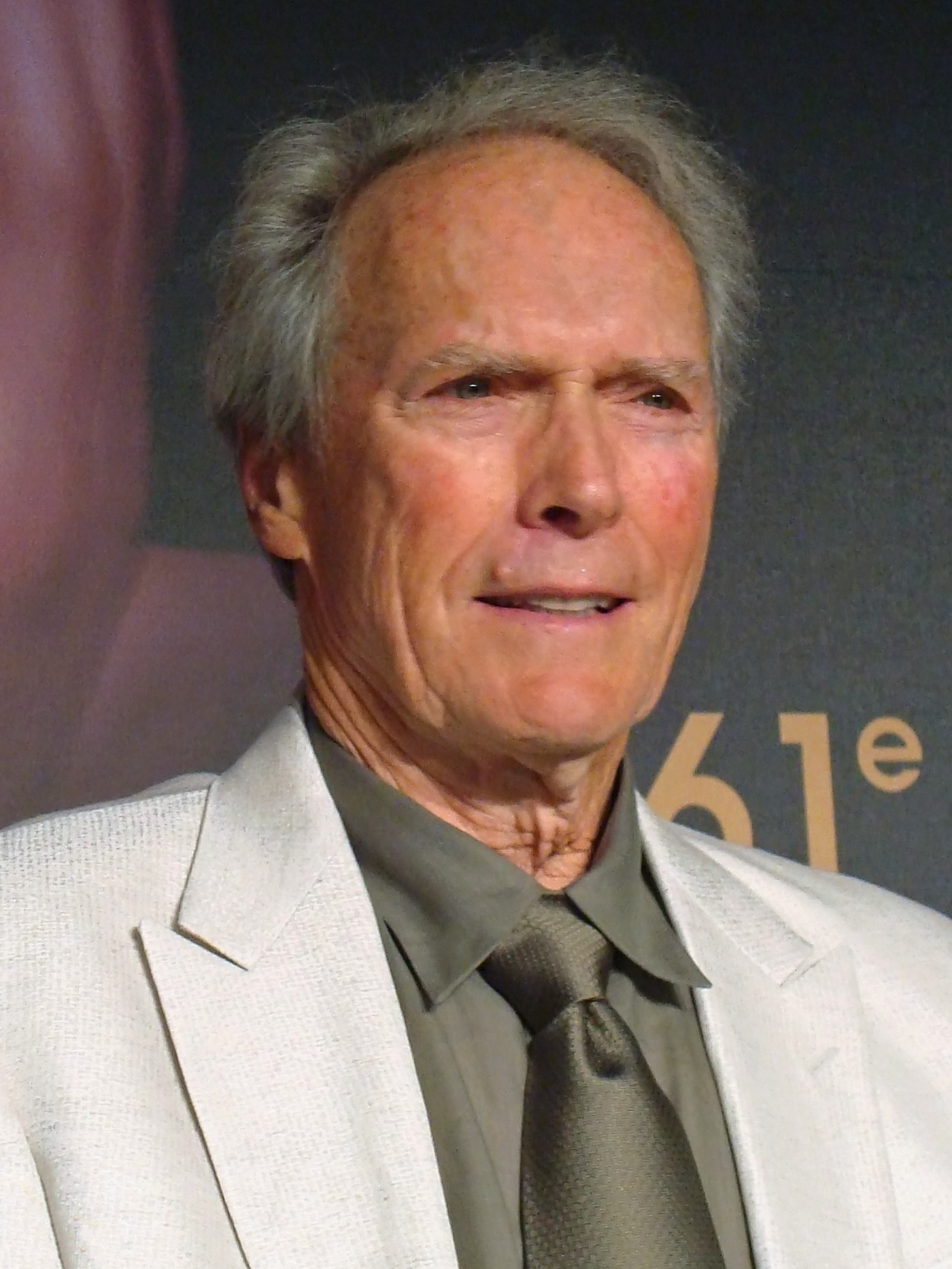
Clint Eastwood, Best Original Song co-winner

=== Best Actor – Drama ===
Viggo Mortensen – Eastern Promises

- Christian Bale – Rescue Dawn
- Josh Brolin – No Country for Old Men
- Tommy Lee Jones – In the Valley of Elah
- Frank Langella – Starting Out in the Evening
- Denzel Washington – American Gangster

=== Best Actor – Comedy or Musical ===
Ryan Gosling – Lars and the Real Girl

- Don Cheadle – Talk to Me
- Richard Gere – The Hoax
- Ben Kingsley – You Kill Me
- Clive Owen – Shoot 'Em Up
- Seth Rogen – Knocked Up

=== Best Actress – Drama ===
Marion Cotillard – La Vie en Rose (La môme)

- Julie Christie – Away from Her
- Angelina Jolie – A Mighty Heart
- Keira Knightley – Atonement
- Laura Linney – The Savages
- Tilda Swinton – Stephanie Daley

=== Best Actress – Comedy or Musical ===
Elliot Page – Juno

- Amy Adams – Enchanted
- Cate Blanchett – I'm Not There
- Katherine Heigl – Knocked Up
- Nicole Kidman – Margot at the Wedding
- Emily Mortimer – Lars and the Real Girl

=== Best Animated or Mixed Media Film ===
Ratatouille

- 300
- Beowulf
- The Golden Compass
- Persepolis
- The Simpsons Movie

=== Best Art Direction and Production Design ===
Elizabeth: The Golden Age

- Across the Universe
- Amazing Grace
- The Assassination of Jesse James by the Coward Robert Ford
- Hairspray
- Sunshine

=== Best Cinematography ===
The Diving Bell and the Butterfly (Le scaphandre et le papillon) – Janusz Kamiński

- Across the Universe – Bruno Delbonnel
- The Assassination of Jesse James by the Coward Robert Ford – Roger Deakins
- The Golden Compass – Henry Braham
- There Will Be Blood – Robert Elswit
- Zodiac – Harris Savides

=== Best Costume Design ===
Elizabeth: The Golden Age

- Amazing Grace
- Atonement
- Goya's Ghosts
- Hairspray
- La Vie en Rose (La môme)

=== Best Director ===
Joel Coen and Ethan Coen – No Country for Old Men

- David Cronenberg – Eastern Promises
- Olivier Dahan – La Vie en Rose (La môme)
- Ang Lee – Lust, Caution (Se, jie)
- Sidney Lumet – Before the Devil Knows You're Dead
- Sarah Polley – Away from Her

=== Best Documentary Film ===
Sicko

- The 11th Hour
- Darfur Now
- The King of Kong
- Lake of Fire
- No End in Sight

=== Best Film – Comedy or Musical ===
Juno

- Hairspray
- Knocked Up
- Lars and the Real Girl
- Margot at the Wedding
- Shoot 'Em Up

=== Best Film – Drama ===
No Country for Old Men

- 3:10 to Yuma
- Away from Her
- Before the Devil Knows You're Dead
- Eastern Promises
- The Lookout

=== Best Film Editing ===
American Gangster

- The Bourne Ultimatum
- Eastern Promises
- La Vie en Rose (La môme)
- The Lookout

=== Best Foreign Language Film ===
Lust, Caution (Se, jie) • Taiwan

- 4 Months, 3 Weeks and 2 Days (4 luni, 3 saptamani si 2 zile) • Romania
- La Vie en Rose (La môme) • France
- Offside • Iran
- The Orphanage (El orfanato) • Spain
- Ten Canoes • Australia

=== Best Original Score ===
"The Kite Runner" – Alberto Iglesias

- "The Assassination of Jesse James by the Coward Robert Ford" – Nick Cave
- "Atonement" – Dario Marianelli
- "Eastern Promises" – Howard Shore
- "The Lookout" – James Newton Howard
- "Ratatouille" – Michael Giacchino

=== Best Original Song ===
"Grace Is Gone" (written by Clint Eastwood and Carole Bayer Sager) – Grace Is Gone

- "Come So Far" (written by Marc Shaiman) – Hairspray
- "Do You Feel Me" (written by Diane Warren) – American Gangster
- "If You Want Me" (written by Glen Hansard and Markéta Irglová) – Once
- "Lyra" (written by Kate Bush) – The Golden Compass
- "Rise" (written by Eddie Vedder) – Into the Wild

=== Best Screenplay – Adapted ===
Atonement – Christopher Hampton

- Away from Her – Sarah Polley
- The Kite Runner – David Benioff
- Lust, Caution (Se, jie) – Hui-Ling Wang and James Schamus
- No Country for Old Men – Joel Coen and Ethan Coen
- Zodiac – James Vanderbilt

=== Best Screenplay – Original ===
Juno – Diablo Cody

- Before the Devil Knows You're Dead – Kelly Masterson
- Eastern Promises – Steven Knight
- Lars and the Real Girl – Nancy Oliver
- The Lookout – Scott Frank
- Michael Clayton – Tony Gilroy

=== Best Sound ===
The Bourne Ultimatum

- 300
- The Golden Compass
- I Am Legend
- La Vie en Rose (La môme)
- Pirates of the Caribbean: At World's End

=== Best Supporting Actor ===
Casey Affleck – The Assassination of Jesse James by the Coward Robert Ford (TIE)
Tom Wilkinson – Michael Clayton (TIE)

- Javier Bardem – No Country for Old Men
- Brian Cox – Zodiac
- Jeff Daniels – The Lookout
- Ben Foster – 3:10 to Yuma

=== Best Supporting Actress ===
Amy Ryan – Gone Baby Gone

- Ruby Dee – American Gangster
- Taraji P. Henson – Talk to Me
- Saoirse Ronan – Atonement
- Emmanuelle Seigner – La Vie en Rose (La môme)
- Tilda Swinton – Michael Clayton

=== Best Visual Effects ===
300

- Beowulf
- The Bourne Ultimatum
- Enchanted
- The Golden Compass
- Transformers

=== Outstanding Motion Picture Ensemble ===
Before the Devil Knows You're Dead

== Television winners and nominees ==
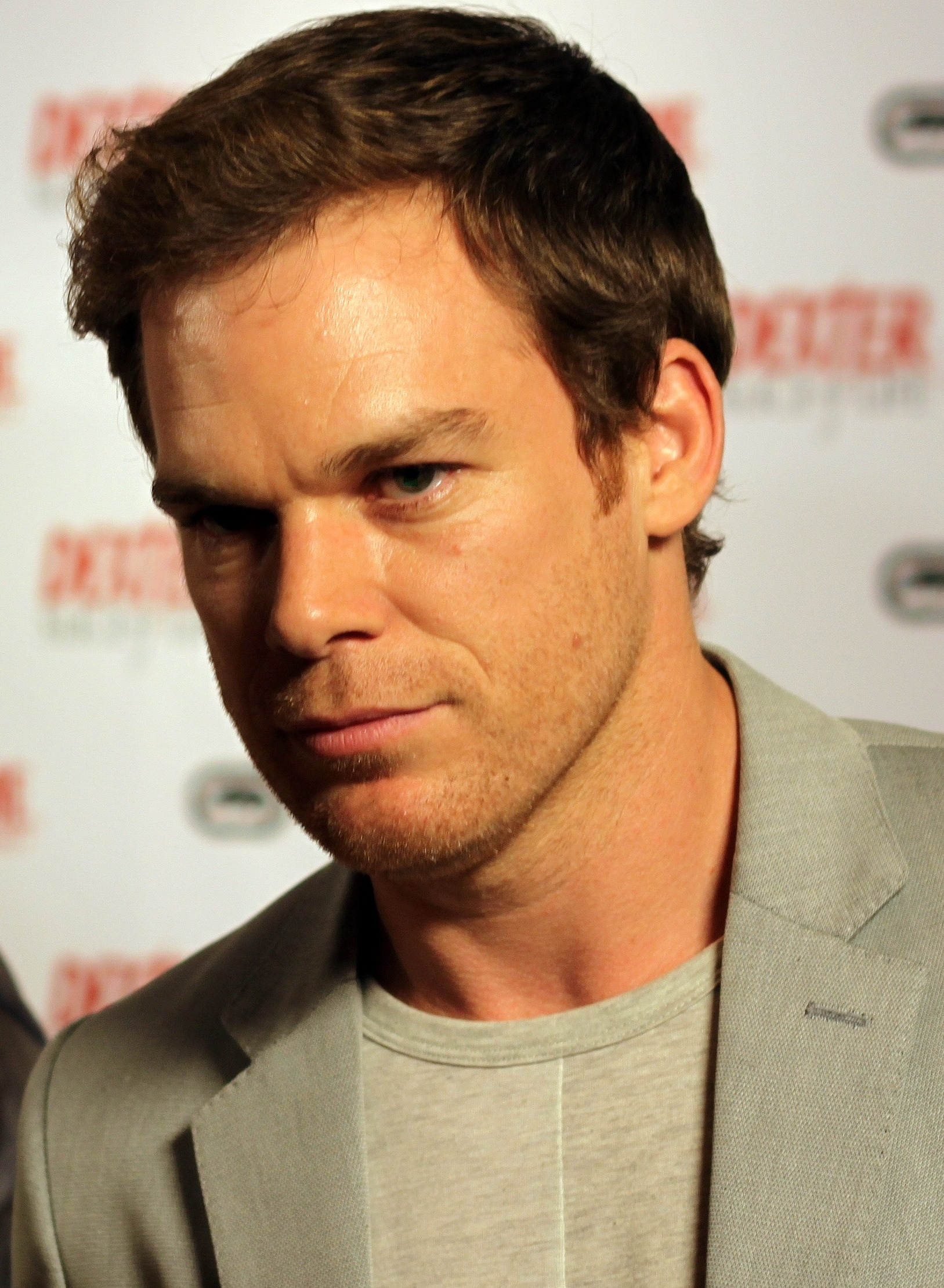
Michael C. Hall, Best Actor in a Drama Series winner

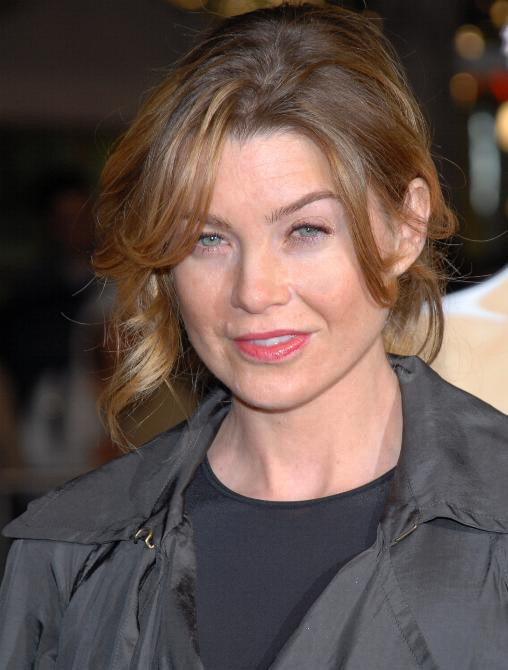
Ellen Pompeo, Best Actress in a Drama Series winner

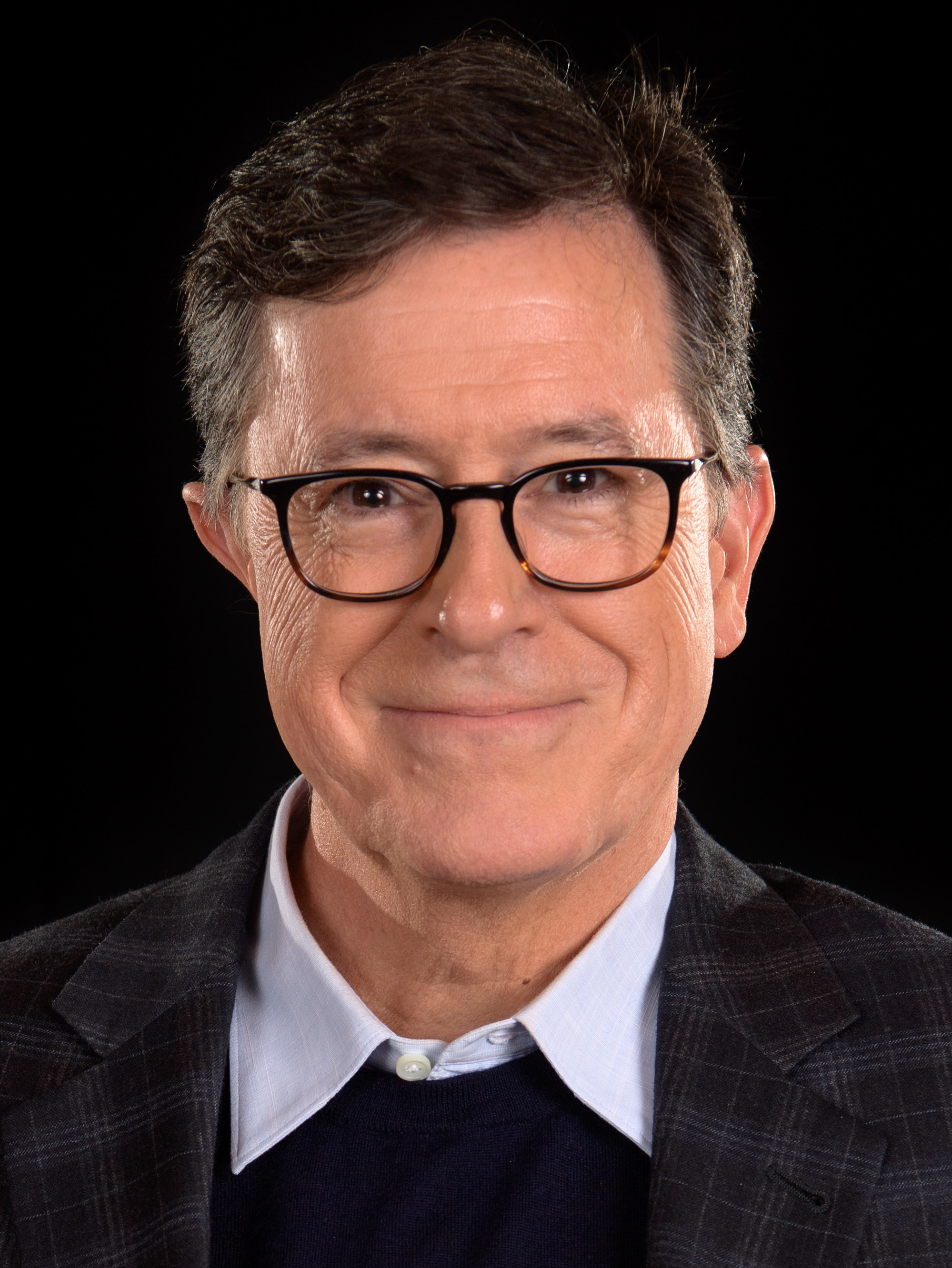
Stephen Colbert, Best Actor in a Comedy or Musical Series winner

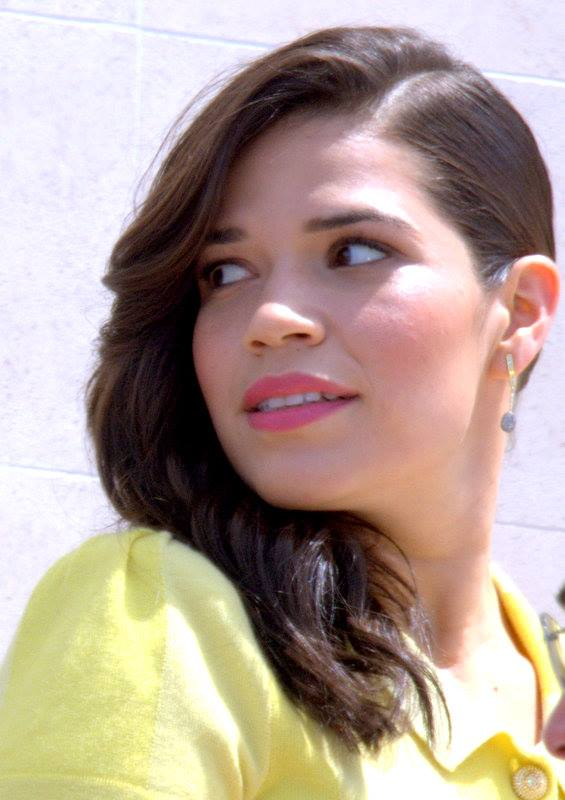
America Ferrera, Best Actress in a Comedy or Musical Series winner

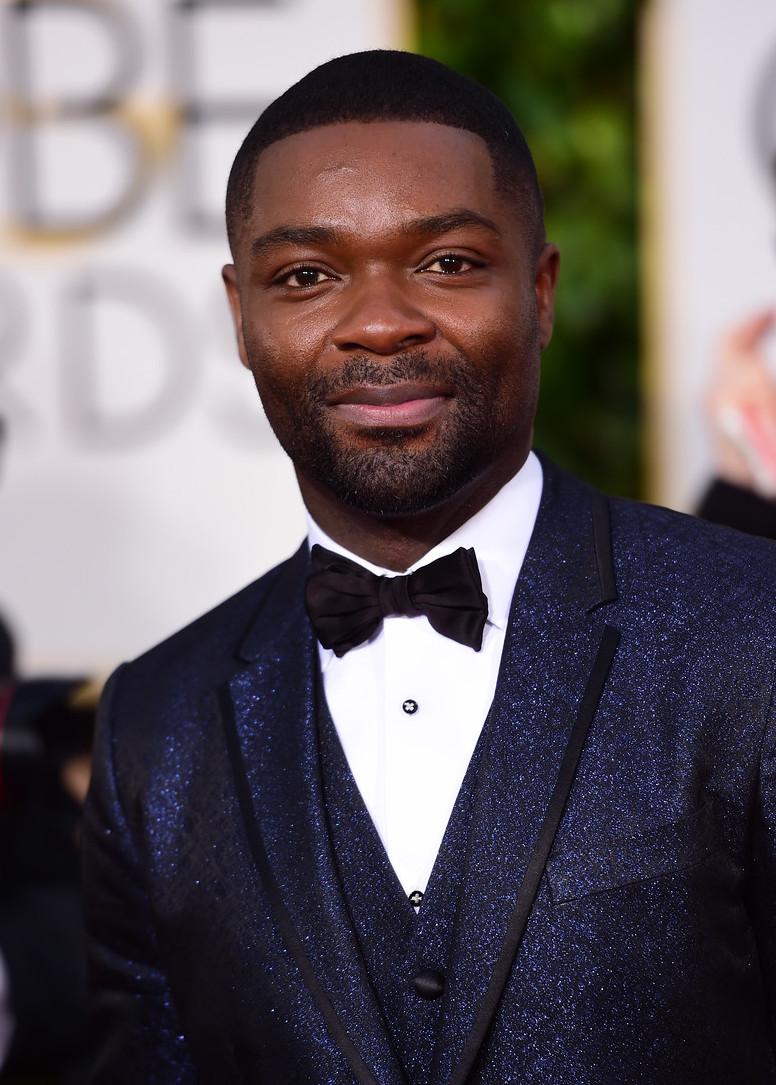
David Oyelowo, Best Actor in a Miniseries or Motion Picture Made for Television winner

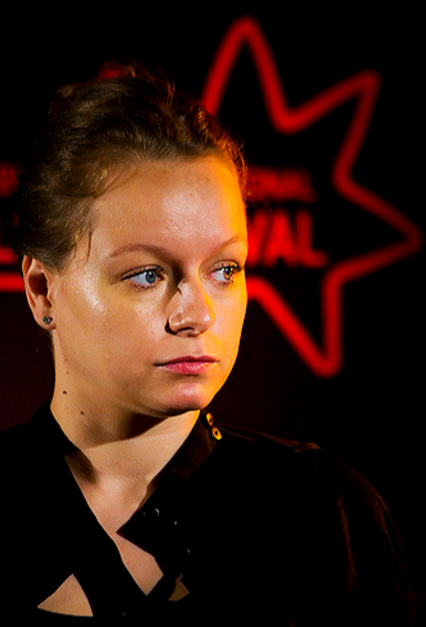
Samantha Morton, Best Actress in a Miniseries or Motion Picture Made for Television winner

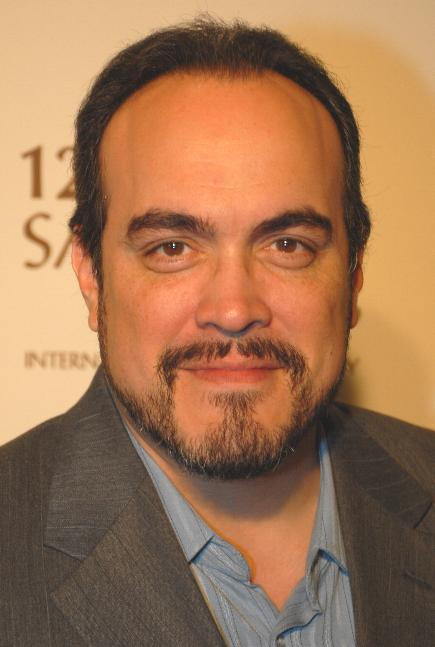
David Zayas, Best Supporting Actor in a Series, Miniseries, or Motion Picture Made for Television winner

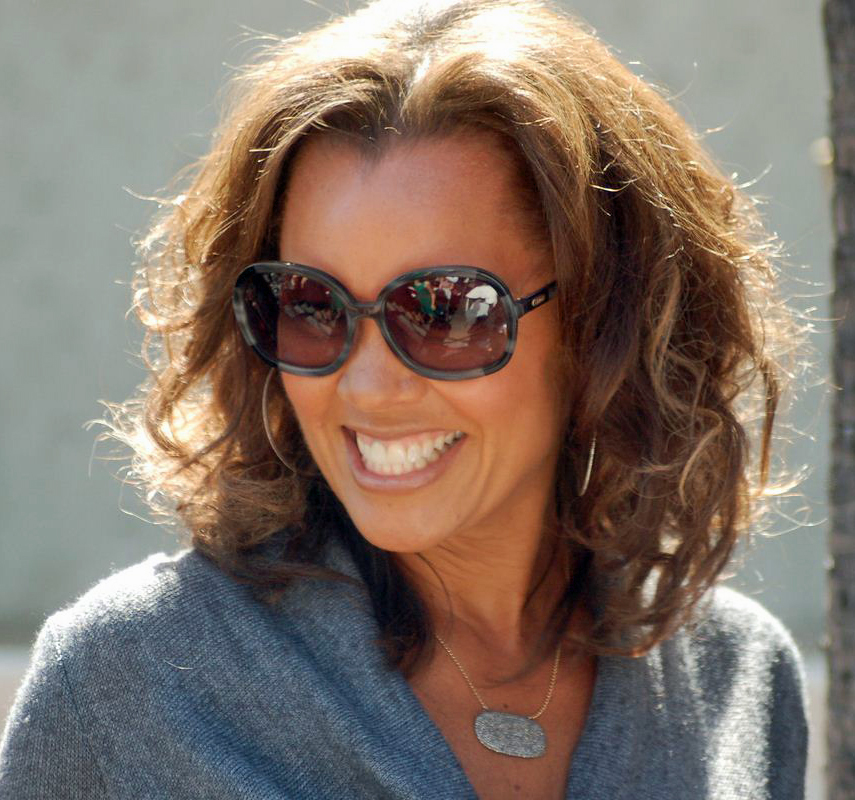
Vanessa Williams, Best Supporting Actress in a Series, Miniseries, or Motion Picture Made for Television winner

=== Best Actor – Drama Series ===
Michael C. Hall – Dexter

- Eddie Izzard – The Riches
- Hugh Laurie – House
- Denis Leary – Rescue Me
- Bill Paxton – Big Love
- James Woods – Shark

=== Best Actor – Comedy or Musical Series ===
Stephen Colbert – The Colbert Report

- Alec Baldwin – 30 Rock
- Steve Carell – The Office
- Ricky Gervais – Extras
- Zachary Levi – Chuck
- Lee Pace – Pushing Daisies

=== Best Actor – Miniseries or Motion Picture Made for Television ===
David Oyelowo – Five Days

- Jim Broadbent – Longford
- Robert Lindsay – The Trial of Tony Blair
- Aidan Quinn – Bury My Heart at Wounded Knee
- Tom Selleck – Jesse Stone: Sea Change
- Toby Stephens – Jane Eyre

=== Best Actress – Drama Series ===
Ellen Pompeo – Grey's Anatomy

- Glenn Close – Damages
- Minnie Driver – The Riches
- Sally Field – Brothers & Sisters
- Kyra Sedgwick – The Closer
- Jeanne Tripplehorn – Big Love

=== Best Actress – Comedy or Musical Series ===
America Ferrera – Ugly Betty

- Tina Fey – 30 Rock
- Anna Friel – Pushing Daisies
- Patricia Heaton – Back to You
- Felicity Huffman – Desperate Housewives
- Julia Louis-Dreyfus – The New Adventures of Old Christine

=== Best Actress – Miniseries or Motion Picture Made for Television ===
Samantha Morton – Longford

- Ellen Burstyn – Oprah Winfrey Presents: Mitch Albom's For One More Day
- Queen Latifah – Life Support
- Debra Messing – The Starter Wife
- Sharon Small – The Inspector Lynley Mysteries
- Ruth Wilson – Jane Eyre

=== Best Miniseries ===
The Amazing Mrs Pritchard

- The Company
- Five Days
- Jane Eyre
- The Starter Wife

=== Best Motion Picture Made for Television ===
Oprah Winfrey Presents: Mitch Albom's For One More Day

- Bury My Heart at Wounded Knee
- Life Support
- Longford
- The Trial of Tony Blair
- The Wind in the Willows

=== Best Series – Comedy or Musical ===
Pushing Daisies

- Chuck
- Extras
- Flight of the Conchords
- Ugly Betty
- Weeds

=== Best Series – Drama ===
Dexter

- Brothers & Sisters
- Friday Night Lights
- Grey's Anatomy
- Mad Men
- The Riches

=== Best Supporting Actor – Series, Miniseries, or Motion Picture Made for Television ===
David Zayas – Dexter

- Michael Emerson – Lost
- Justin Kirk – Weeds
- T. R. Knight – Grey's Anatomy
- Masi Oka – Heroes
- Andy Serkis – Longford
- Harry Dean Stanton – Big Love

=== Best Supporting Actress – Series, Miniseries, or Motion Picture Made for Television ===
Vanessa Williams – Ugly Betty

- Polly Bergen – Desperate Housewives
- Judy Davis – The Starter Wife
- Rachel Griffiths – Brothers & Sisters
- Jaime Pressly – My Name Is Earl
- Chandra Wilson – Grey's Anatomy

=== Outstanding Television Ensemble ===
Mad Men

== New Media winners and nominees ==
=== Best Classic DVD ===
The Graduate (40th Anniversary Edition)

- Ace in the Hole (The Criterion Collection)
- Cruising (Deluxe Edition)
- The Full Monty (Fully Exposed Edition)
- Funny Face (50th Anniversary Edition)
- Ghost (Special Collector's Edition)
- House of Games (The Criterion Collection)
- The Pirate
- RoboCop (20th Anniversary Collector's Edition)
- Stranger Than Paradise (The Criterion Collection)

=== Best Documentary DVD ===
The War

- Addiction
- Alive Day Memories: Home from Iraq
- American Experience (Episode: "The Mormons: Part I")
- Crazy Love
- Jesus Camp
- No End in Sight
- Shut Up and Sing
- Sicko
- An Unreasonable Man

=== Best DVD Extras ===
Borat (TIE)
Masters of Horror (Season 1) (TIE)

- Fiddler on the Roof (2-Disc Collector's Edition)
- Flashdance (Special Collector's Edition)
- The Graduate (40th Anniversary Edition)
- RoboCop (20th Anniversary Collector's Edition)
- The Sergio Leone Anthology
- The Silence of the Lambs (Collector's Edition)
- Viva Pedro: The Almodóvar Collection / Volver
- Wall Street (20th Anniversary Edition)

=== Best DVD Release of a TV Show ===
Dexter (Season 1)

- Daniel Deronda
- The House of Eliott (The Complete Collection)
- Lost (The Complete Third Season)
- The Muppet Show (Season 2)
- Nip/Tuck (Season 4)
- The Office (Season 3)
- Rome (Season 2)
- Twin Peaks (Season 2)
- Ugly Betty (Season 1)

=== Best Overall DVD ===
The Prestige

- Blood Diamond
- Children of Men
- The Flying Scotsman
- Little Children
- The Lives of Others
- Notes on a Scandal
- Pan's Labyrinth
- Rescue Dawn
- Romeo + Juliet (The Music Edition)

=== Best Youth DVD ===
Ratatouille

- Care Bears (25th Anniversary Edition)
- Cars
- Charlotte's Web
- Gracie
- The Jungle Book (40th Anniversary Platinum Edition)
- Little Robots (Episode: "Reach for the Sky")
- The Many Adventures of Winnie the Pooh
- The Pebble and the Penguin
- Peter Pan (2-Disc Platinum Edition)
- Transformers (Two-Disc Special Edition)

=== Outstanding Action/Adventure Game ===
God of War II

- BioShock
- Gears of War
- The Legend of Zelda: Twilight Princess
- Metal Gear Solid: Portable Ops

=== Outstanding Puzzle/Strategy Game ===
Medieval II: Total War

- Civilization IV: Beyond the Sword
- Command & Conquer 3: Tiberium Wars
- Puzzle Quest: Challenge of the Warlords
- World in Conflict

=== Outstanding Role Playing Game ===
Super Paper Mario

- The Lord of the Rings Online: Shadows of Angmar
- Persona 3
- The Witcher
- World of Warcraft: The Burning Crusade

=== Outstanding Sports/Rhythm/Music Game ===
Guitar Hero II

- Elite Beat Agents
- Forza Motorsport 2
- Pro Evolution Soccer 2007
- Wii Sports

== Awards breakdown ==
=== Film ===
Winners:

3 / 3 Juno: Best Actress & Film – Comedy or Musical / Best Screenplay – Original
2 / 2 Elizabeth: The Golden Age: Best Art Direction and Production Design / Best Costume Design
2 / 6 No Country for Old Men: Best Director / Best Film – Drama
1 / 1 The Diving Bell and the Butterfly (Le scaphandre et le papillon): Best Cinematography
1 / 1 Gone Baby Gone: Best Supporting Actress
1 / 1 Grace Is Gone: Best Original Song
1 / 1 Sicko: Best Documentary Film
1 / 2 The Kite Runner: Best Original Score
1 / 2 Ratatouille: Best Animated or Mixed Media Film
1 / 3 300: Best Visual Effects
1 / 3 The Bourne Ultimatum: Best Sound
1 / 3 Lust, Caution (Se, jie): Best Foreign Language Film
1 / 3 Michael Clayton: Best Supporting Actor
1 / 4 American Gangster: Best Film Editing
1 / 4 The Assassination of Jesse James by the Coward Robert Ford: Best Supporting Actor
1 / 4 Before the Devil Knows You're Dead: Outstanding Motion Picture Ensemble
1 / 4 Lars and the Real Girl: Best Actor – Comedy or Musical
1 / 5 Atonement: Best Screenplay – Adapted
1 / 6 Eastern Promises: Best Actor – Drama
1 / 7 La Vie en Rose (La môme): Best Actress – Drama

Losers:

0 / 5 The Golden Compass, The Lookout
0 / 4 Away from Her, Hairspray
0 / 3 Knocked Up, Zodiac
0 / 2 3:10 to Yuma, Across the Universe, Amazing Grace, Beowulf, Enchanted, Margot at the Wedding, Shoot 'Em Up, Talk to Me

=== Television ===
Winners:

3 / 3 Dexter: Best Actor – Drama Series / Best Series – Drama / Best Supporting Actor – Series, Miniseries, or Motion Picture Made for Television
2 / 3 Ugly Betty: Best Actress – Comedy or Musical Series / Best Supporting Actress – Series, Miniseries, or Motion Picture Made for Television
1 / 1 The Amazing Mrs Pritchard: Best Miniseries
1 / 1 The Colbert Report: Best Actor – Comedy or Musical Series
1 / 2 Five Days: Best Actor – Miniseries or Motion Picture Made for Television
1 / 2 Mad Men: Outstanding Television Ensemble
1 / 2 Oprah Winfrey Presents: Mitch Albom's For One More Day: Best Motion Picture Made for Television
1 / 3 Pushing Daisies: Best Series – Comedy or Musical Series
1 / 4 Grey's Anatomy: Best Actress – Drama Series
1 / 4 Longford: Best Actress – Miniseries or Motion Picture Made for Television

Losers:

0 / 3 Big Love, Brothers & Sisters, Jane Eyre, The Riches, The Starter Wife
0 / 2 30 Rock, Bury My Heart at Wounded Knee, Chuck, Desperate Housewives, Extras, Life Support, The Trial of Tony Blair, Weeds
