= For One More Day =

2006 novel by Mitch Albom

- Author: Mitch Albom
- Cover artist: Brianna Serrano
- Genre: Fiction
- Publisher: Little Brown
- Publication date: 26 September 2006
- Publication place: United States
- Media type: Print hardcover and paperback
- Pages: 208
- ISBN: 1-4013-0327-7
- OCLC: 70043491
- Dewey Decimal: 813/.6 22
- LC Class: PS3601.L335 F596 2006

For One More Day is a 2006 philosophical novel by Mitch Albom. Like his previous works (Tuesdays with Morrie and The Five People You Meet in Heaven), it features mortality as a central theme. The book tells the story of a troubled man and his mother, and explores how people might use the opportunity to spend a day with a lost relative.

== Plot ==
The book's theme is mortality: it analyzes how people might react to the chance to have a dead relative back for a day.

The book tells the story of Charles "Chick" Benetto, a former baseball player who encounters a myriad of problems with his career, finances, family, and alcohol abuse. This leads him to become suicidal. Charles goes on a drunken rampage and decides he is going to end his life in his old hometown, but when he misses the exit, he turns around driving down the wrong side of the highway causing an accident, he then jumps off of a water tower in his home town trying to kill himself again but it doesn't work. Benetto sees his mother, who had died eight years prior standing at the dugout on the field that he had landed on.

Benetto returns to his old family home, and spends one more day with his mother, where in a number of previously unknown factors related to his difficult childhood and troubled relationship with his father are revealed to him. His mother assists him in resolving his issues and getting his life back on track. The day ends when Benetto regains consciousness at the scene of the accident in a police officer's arms.

The book's epilogue describes how Benetto was inspired by his experience to quit drinking and reconcile with family, including his daughter, Maria, before his death five years later. At the end, Maria is revealed to have been the narrator of the story.

== Reception ==
The book received polarised reviews from critics. Some praised the book heavily, remarking that it was "hugely effective" and "exceptional". Other commentators criticised the book as "syrupy" and "lazy, sloppy literature". Nevertheless, the book sold well, making it to the top of The New York Times Best Seller list.

== Television adaptation ==
The book was adapted in a made-for-television movie called Oprah Winfrey Presents: Mitch Albom's For One More Day starring Michael Imperioli and Ellen Burstyn. It aired on ABC on December 9, 2007.

Despite praise for both Imperioli and Burstyn's performances, critics described the film with phrases such as "ludicrous" and "phony sincerity". The film won the 2007 Satellite Award in best television film category.
