= Chris Hawkey =

American singer-songwriter

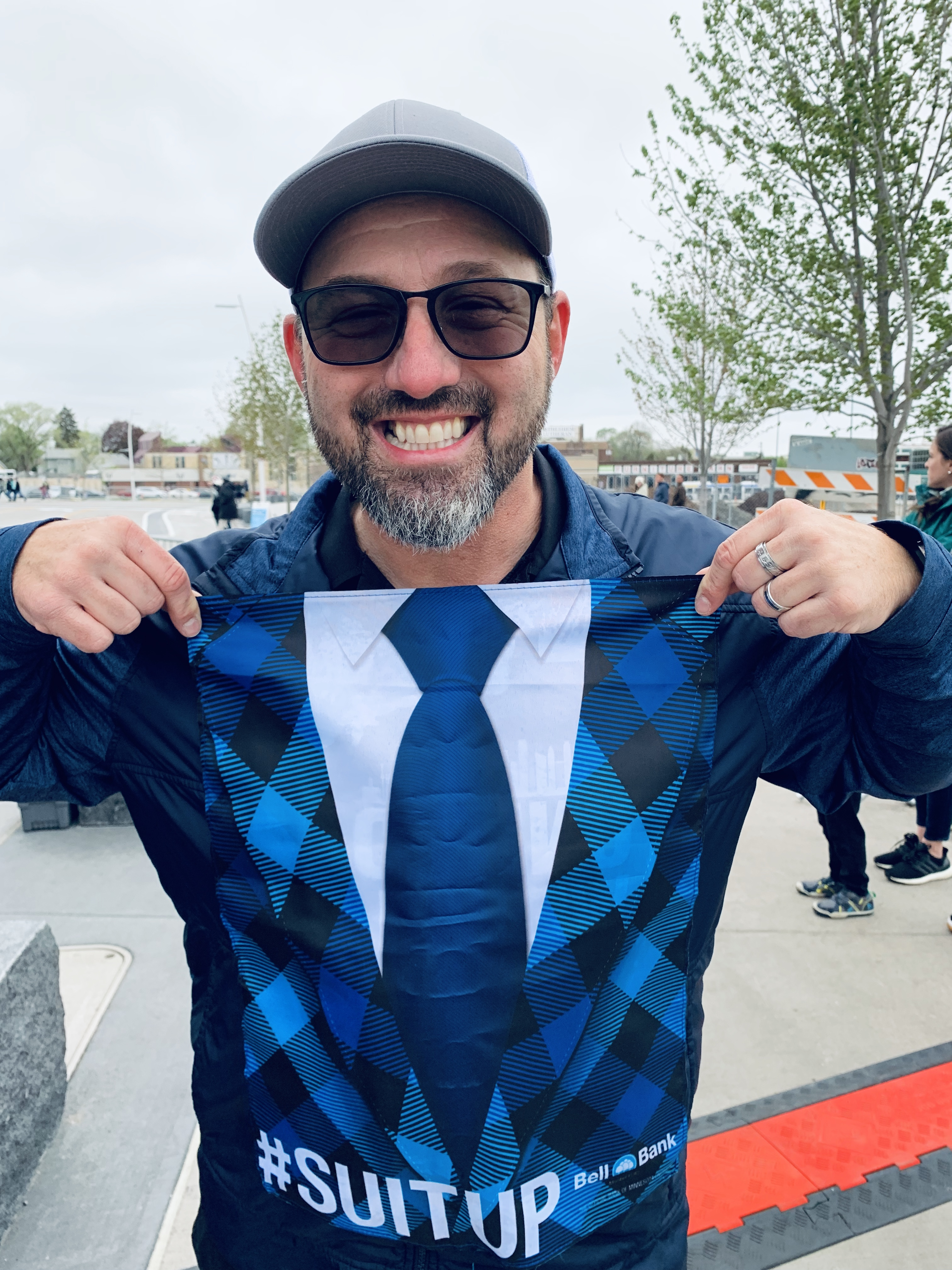
- Singer and radio announcer Chris Hawkey.

Background information
- Born: Christopher Allen Hawkey; December 25, 1970 (age 55); Union City, Indiana, U.S.
- Genres: Country
- Occupations: Singer; Songwriter; Radio Producer; Radio Host
- Instrument: Vocals
- Years active: 2001–present
- Website: www.chrishawkey.com

Christopher Allen Hawkey (born December 25, 1970) is an American country music artist who is a member of the Minneapolis band Rocket Club and is the vocalist of the Chris Hawkey Band. He lives in the Twin Cities and also produces and co-hosts a sports radio morning show, Power Trip Morning Show.

== Personal life and radio ==
Chris Hawkey was born a twin whose brother didn't survive their birth and raised in Union City, Indiana, where he graduated from Mississinawa Valley High School. Starting in 1989 he attended a broadcasting school in Dayton, Ohio, pursuing careers in both radio and music. He got a job running a control board for the syndicated Howard Stern Show before getting hired in 2001 to co-host and produce the Power Trip Morning Show on KFAN Radio, a sports radio network. Hawkey produces the radio broadcast of the Minnesota Vikings and is a play-by-play announcer for AMSOIL Championship Snocross on CBS Sports Network.

== Musical career ==
In 2001 Hawkey recorded his first solo project, "Minutes to Memories", which showcased his songwriting. He had a second solo project, "The Pursuit", which was a benefit partnership that raised money from record sales.

=== RYZ ===
Ryz was a rock band that performed mostly in the Los Angeles area in the late 1980s and early 1990s. Chris Hawkey was the lead singer of the band. They recorded such songs as "The Distance", "Wicked Ways", "Waiting and Watching", and "Wild Ones". Ryz ultimately broke up when offered the opportunity to go on tour opening for Gorky Park. Hawkey thought it was a great opportunity but other members did not want to leave their day jobs, so they went their separate directions.

=== Rocket Club ===
In 2008, Hawkey became the lead vocalist of Rocket Club, a Minneapolis band, and stayed with the group for six years. As a part of Rocket Club, he has shared the stage with such artists as Luke Bryan, Jason Aldean, Sugarland, Dierks Bentley, Miranda Lambert, and Eric Church. In 2022, the band reunited and has started recording new music.

=== Chris Hawkey Band ===
In 2014, Hawkey released his first solo country record. The 8-song collection included the hit single "My Kinda Crazy." In 2016 he released another album, Smile, which included the song "Good Liar" by Brett James. The Chris Hawkey Band includes Ryan Liestman (keyboard) and Michael Bland (drummer).

=== Twin Cities Music Festival ===
In 2019, Hawkey helped organize and performed at the Twin Cities Summer Jam.

== Discography ==
=== Albums ===
Title	Details
Minutes to Memories	Release date: 2003; Label:
The Pursuit	Release date: 2006; Label:
Chris Hawkey	Release date: 2014; Label:
Country Underneath	Release date: 2015; Label:
Shine	Release date: 2016; Label:
One Mic One Take (Live)	Release date: 2018; Label:

=== Singles ===
Year	Single	Peak positions	Album
Year	Single	US Country"	Album
2014	"My Kinda Crazy"		Chris Hawkey
2014	"Favorite Song"		
2014	"Shotgun DJ"		
2015	"Country Underneath"		Country Underneath
2016	"Good Liar"		Shine
2017	"Happy"		
