= Nicholas Daines =

UK gymnast and stuntman

Nicholas Daines is a professional gymnast and high diver from Surrey, UK, who competed in the 2003 Trampoline World Championships before becoming a Hollywood stuntman.

In 2013, Daines is European Masters High Dive champion. He won a silver medal at the Open Dutch Masters Diving Championship in 2012 and was crowned European Masters 3M Champion and 10M Champion, in Kiev in 2011.

Daines is a member of Equity and the World Stunt Academy.

He has performed stunts in over 50 TV shows and films, including Charlie and the Chocolate Factory, Die Another Day, World War Z, Neverland and four Harry Potter films.

Daines was a member of the stunt team which won a Screen Actor's Guild award for performance in Harry Potter and the Deathly Hallows (Part 2). In 2008 Nicholas was nominated for a Taurus World Stunt Award for his high fall from a glacier in Switzerland on the motion picture The Golden Compass.

Daines has appeared in advertisements for Adidas, G Star Raw and Yellow Pages. He is a stunt double for Michael Owen.
