= Rocket Club =

American country music band

- Origin: Minneapolis–Saint Paul, Minnesota, United States
- Genres: Country
- Years active: 2008-present
- Label: Feather Moon/Rocket Club
- Members: Chris Hawkey; Matt Kirkwold; Brian Kroening; Joel Sayles; Don Smithmier; Walter Powell

Rocket Club is an American country music band composed of Joel Sayles (bass, vocals), Brian Kroening (guitars), Don Smithmier (vocals, keyboards), Chris Hawkey (vocals), Matt Kirkwold (guitars), and Walter Powell (drums).

== History ==
The band's first national single, "One More Day," was written by Joel Sayles, Don Smithmier, and Twin Cities native Mark Lacek after Lacek's daughter died in the womb. The song got viral exposure via Facebook and YouTube, as well as airplay on Minneapolis radio station KEEY-FM. It is also included on a multi-artist album entitled Hope Rocks Volume II, the benefits of which go to a nonprofit organization that Mark and his wife, Susan, founded. "One More Day" debuted on the Billboard Hot Country Songs charts dated for the week of November 21, 2009.

The band's second single, "One Thing Beautiful," written by Joel Sayles and Don Smithmier, spent 14 weeks on the Billboard Hot Country Songs charts beginning July 12, 2010.

Rocket Club's debut self-titled CD was released in 2008. Their second record, American Serenade, was released in October 2010.

In 2010, the band coined the term "North Country" to describe its more guitar oriented, non-Southern form of country music. They later turned the concept into a northern anthem with the release of their 3rd single, "North Country," which debuted on the Billboard Hot Country Songs on June 14, 2011. An album of the same name was released in 2012.

The band released its fourth studio album on March 13, 2014, titled Lucky and produced by Joel Sayles. The album was named after the project that created it. In 2013, the band completed a project dubbed "Lucky 13" in which it wrote, recorded and released one new song each month for a year.

After a nearly 8-year hiatus, the band released the single, “Easy,” in February 2022. This collaboration led to a full reunion and the release of their fifth album, “Come On Home” in 2023.

== Other information ==
Smithmier is a Minnesota tech entrepreneur.

Guitarist Luke Kramer was a band member from 2011 to 2014 and performed on the “North Country” and “Lucky” albums. Billy Thommes (drums) was a founding band member and performed all every album. Founding guitarist Matt Kirkwold re-joined the band in 2022. Walter Powell (drums) joined the band in 2023.

== Discography ==
=== Albums ===
Title	Details
Rocket Club	Release date: October 21, 2008; Label: Feather Moon
American Serenade	Release date: October 1, 2010; Label: Feather Moon
North Country	Release date: April 9, 2012; Label: Feather Moon
Lucky	Release date: March 13, 2014; Label: Feather Moon
Come On Home	Release date: February 1, 2023; Label: Feather Moon

=== Singles ===
Year	Single	Peak positions	Album
Year	Single	US Country	Album
2009	"One More Day"	49	American Serenade
2010	"One Thing Beautiful"	51	American Serenade
2011	"North Country"	52	North Country

=== Music videos ===
Year	Video
2009	"One More Day"
2011	"North Country"
2012	"Four Letter World"
