= Oprah Winfrey Presents: Mitch Albom's For One More Day =

- Also known as: For One More Day
- Based on: For One More Day by Mitch Albom
- Teleplay by: Mitch Albom
- Directed by: Lloyd Kramer
- Starring: Michael Imperioli; Ellen Burstyn
- Composer: Lennie Niehaus
- Country of origin: United States
- Original language: English

Production
- Producer: Oprah Winfrey
- Cinematography: Tami Reiker
- Running time: 92 min
- Production company: Harpo Films

Original release
- Release: December 9, 2007

Related
- The Five People You Meet in Heaven (2004) (TV)

For One More Day is a 2007 television film adaptation of the Mitch Albom's 2006 novel of the same name, which was a New York Times Best Seller. Produced by Oprah Winfrey's Harpo Productions, the film stars Michael Imperioli and Ellen Burstyn as leads. Director Lloyd Kramer also directed the TV film version of Albom's 2003 novel The Five People You Meet in Heaven. Michael Imperioli who also appeared in the previous film, had his son, Vadim, play his younger version in this film.

Nick Lachey performs the song "Ordinary Day" on the soundtrack of the film. The film was first aired by ABC on December 9, 2007.

== Plot ==
The film is the story of a broken-down former baseball player, Charley Benetto (Imperioli), who is now divorced and estranged from his own daughter, on the verge of a suicide who gets to spend one more day with his estranged departed mother (Burstyn), whom he had blamed for leaving his father. Throughout the course of the movie, she takes him to various points in his life and he learns what actually was going on to get a truer picture of his life.

== Cast ==
- Michael Imperioli as Charley "Chick" Benetto
- Ellen Burstyn as Pauline "Posey" Benetto
- Scott Cohen as Len Benetto
- Samantha Mathis as Young Pauline "Posey" Benetto
- Sara Jerez as Gianna Benetto
- Vadim Imperioli as Young Charley "Chick" Benetto
- Jaclyn Tommer as Roberta Benetto
- Alice Drummond as Rose
- Emily Wickersham as Maria

== Crew ==
- Casting: Sheila Jaffe
- Production Design: Clark Hunter
- Art Direction: Hinju Kim, Fredda Slavin
- Set Decoration: Traci Kirschbaum
- Costume Design: Juliet Polcsa

== Production ==
The film was shot extensively at Bridgeport, Connecticut, New York, and at two locations in the Fairfield University campus including the Loyola Hall. The Sopranos makeup artist Stephen Kelley helped Imperioli, who was in his early 40s at the time, portray the character from age 20 into his 50s.

== Awards and nominations ==
- 2007: Satellite Awards
  - Best Television Film (won)
  - Best Actress – Miniseries or Television Film: Ellen Burstyn (nominated)
- 2007: Directors Guild of America Awards
  - Miniseries or TV Film: Lloyd Kramer (nominated)
- 2008: 14th Screen Actors Guild Awards
  - Outstanding Performance by a Female Actor in Television Movie or Miniseries: Ellen Burstyn: (nominated)
