= Twin Cities Summer Jam =

Music festival in Shakopee, Minnesota

- Genre: Rock, pop, country
- Location: Shakopee, Minnesota
- Years active: 2019-2022
- Website: tcsummerjam.com

Twin Cities Summer Jam was a music festival in Shakopee, Minnesota that took place each year in July at Canterbury Park.

Twin Cities Summer Jam was founded in 2018 as the first multi-day, multi-genre music festival in the Twin Cities, MN metro area. The goal of TC Summer Jam was to bring the best musical acts possible to an outdoor festival setting, so fans can come together for an unforgettable experience.

== History ==
The inaugural Twin Cities Summer Jam was held July 18–20, 2019. Tickets went on sale March 18, 2019.

The festival was announced in August, 2018. Tim McGraw was the first performer tied to Twin Cities Summer Jam. KFAN radio personality and country rocker Chris Hawkey teamed up with festival promoter Jerry Braam to organize the festival. Hawkey is scheduled to perform on Friday.

It was announced that the 2022 festival would be the last one due to construction of an outdoor music amphitheater in the festival location.

=== 2022 ===
Twin Cities Summer Jam took place in July 2022. Scheduled artists included:

Thursday, July 21:Hairball, Fabulous Armadillos, Anderson Daniels

Friday, July 22: Kane Brown, Nelly, Kidd G, Callista Clark, Restless Road

Saturday, July 23: Blake Shelton, Trace Adkins, Elvie Shane, 38 Special, Mason–Dixon line

=== 2021 ===
Dates for the 2021 (rescheduled 2020 dates) Summer Jam were Thursday, July 22 through Saturday, July 24. Artists that played on the main stage include:

- Thursday: Lynyrd Skynyrd, Kip Moore, Tim Montana, 32 Below
- Friday: Carrie Underwood, Brett Young, Blanco Brown, Ian Munsick, Chris Kroeze
- Saturday: Zac Brown Band, Ashley McBryde, Niko Moon, Fabulous Armadillos, Shane Martin

Local artists Street Talk, Jake Nelson Band, Johnny O'Neil, Hell Burnin' Sinners, Anderson Daniels, and Girls Night Out played on the K102 Stage.

=== 2020 (postponed to 2021) ===
Dates for the 2020 Summer Jam were Thursday, July 23 through Saturday, July 25. Artists that were scheduled to perform included:

- Thursday: Pitbull and Nelly
- Friday: Zac Brown Band and Third Eye Blind
- Saturday: Carrie Underwood

The 2020 festival was postponed due to the COVID-19 pandemic, with some of the artists returning for 2021.

=== 2019 ===
The festival's first announced lineup featured headliners Rascal Flatts on Thursday, July 18; Aerosmith on Friday, July 19; and Tim McGraw on Saturday, July 20. The lineup included pop, rock, and country artists and bands.

The lineup, ordered as advertised on the festival's website, is as follows:

- Aerosmith
- Tim McGraw
- Rascal Flatts
- Pitbull
- REO Speedwagon
- Buckcherry
- Soul Asylum
- Chris Hawkey
- Hobo Johnson and The Lovemakers
- Quietdrive
- Elvie Shane
- Christina Taylor

== Pepsi Rising Star Competition ==
In, 2019, Pepsi sponsored a performance competition where musicians and bands auditioned via submitted video for the chance to perform at the festival. Six finalists were named and competed for three final spots at Mall of America on June 29, 2019. The finalists were country singer Todd Hurst, rock band Lake Avenue, pop singer Russ Parish, country singer Erin Grand, rock duo Exactlyno, and pop group Briggsy Pop.

Grand, Lake Avenue, and Parrish won the competition in the country, rock and pop categories, respectively.

== See also ==
- List of country music festivals
