= Lyra (song) =

Song by Kate Bush

from the album The Golden Compass soundtrack
- Language: English
- Released: 26 November 2007
- Recorded: 2007; EMI Abbey Road Studios, London, England and Kate Bush's studio
- Genre: Art rock
- Length: 3:19
- Label: New Line Records; EMI Records
- Songwriter: Kate Bush
- Producer: Kate Bush

"Lyra" is a song written, produced, and performed by British recording artist Kate Bush, from the 2007 soundtrack album The Golden Compass from the film of the same name. It is used in the closing credits of the film. Bush was commissioned to write the song, with the request that it make reference to the lead character, Lyra Belacqua.

== Background ==
According to Del Palmer, Bush was asked to do the song at very short notice and the whole project was completed in 10 days. The song was produced and recorded by Bush in her own studio, and features the Magdalen College, Oxford choir. It contains the introduction of an unused song written for Disney's Dinosaur.

== Critical reception and recognition ==
"Lyra" was nominated for the International Press Academy's Satellite Award for Best Original Song.

== Chart performance ==
The song reached number 187 on the UK Singles Chart, charting on downloads from the album alone.
