= The Golden Compass (film) =

2007 film by Chris Weitz

- American theatrical release poster
- Directed by: Chris Weitz
- Screenplay by: Chris Weitz
- Based on: Northern Lights by Philip Pullman
- Produced by: Bill Carraro; Deborah Forte
- Starring: Nicole Kidman; Sam Elliott; Eva Green; Ian McKellen; Ian McShane; Freddie Highmore; Kathy Bates; Kristin Scott Thomas; Daniel Craig; Dakota Blue Richards
- Cinematography: Henry Braham
- Edited by: Anne V. Coates; Peter Honess; Kevin Tent
- Music by: Alexandre Desplat
- Production companies: New Line Cinema; Ingenious Film Partners; Scholastic Entertainment; Depth of Field
- Distributed by: New Line Cinema; (United States); Entertainment Film Distributors; (United Kingdom)
- Release dates: 27 November 2007 (London premiere); 5 December 2007 (United Kingdom); 7 December 2007 (United States)
- Running time: 113 minutes
- Countries: United States; United Kingdom
- Language: English
- Budget: $180 million
- Box office: $372 million

The Golden Compass is a 2007 fantasy adventure film written and directed by Chris Weitz, based on the 1995 novel Northern Lights by Philip Pullman. It stars Nicole Kidman, Sam Elliott, Eva Green, Dakota Blue Richards and Daniel Craig. In the film, Lyra joins a race of water-workers and seafarers on a trip to the far North in search of children kidnapped by the Gobblers, a group supported by the world's rulers, the Magisterium.

Development on the film was announced in February 2002, but difficulties over the screenplay and the selection of a director (including Weitz departing and returning) caused significant delays. Richards was cast as Lyra in June 2006, with Kidman and Craig joining soon thereafter. Principal photography began that September at Shepperton Studios and lasted for several months. Location filming also took place in England, Switzerland, and Norway.

The Golden Compass premiered in London on 27 November 2007, and was theatrically released in the United Kingdom by Entertainment Film on 5 December and in the United States by New Line Cinema on 7 December. The film received mixed reviews and grossed $372 million against a budget of $180 million. It won Best Visual Effects at the 80th Academy Awards and Best Special Visual Effects at the 61st British Academy Film Awards.

== Plot ==
On an alternate Earth, a church called the Magisterium controls people's beliefs under the auspices of the Authority. Every person's soul exists as their own animal companion, a dæmon, and they must remain in close proximity. When young, people's dæmons change form reflecting their moods, but at the onset of puberty the dæmons settle into one form.

Lyra Belacqua is an orphan raised at Jordan College with her dæmon Pantalaimon or "Pan". Her uncle is Lord Asriel, an explorer and scholar of the college. When he returns from seeking the elusive Dust — cosmic particles that the Magisterium forbids being mentioned — Asriel reveals that Dust at the North Pole links to infinite worlds. He is granted funding for another expedition though, if proven, his theory would undermine the Magisterium's control.

Kidnappers called "the Gobblers" abduct children, including Lyra's friends, Roger Parslow and Billy Costa, a young Gyptian.

Marisa Coulter, a wealthy "friend" of the college, invites Lyra to stay with her in London. Just before she leaves, the Master of the college entrusts Lyra with her uncle's alethiometer, an artefact that reveals the truth, warning her to keep it secret. Mrs. Coulter becomes domineering after Lyra boasts of knowing about Dust. Lyra discovers she leads the Gobblers. After Mrs. Coulter's dæmon tries to steal the alethiometer, she and Pan flee, but are captured. A band of Gyptians save Lyra from the Gobblers, and she joins the Gyptian army sailing north to Trollesund in Norwegian Lapland to rescue their abducted children.

Gyptian elder Farder Coram recognizes the alethiometer that, with his guidance, Lyra learns to decipher. Serafina Pekkala, queen of a witch clan, flies to the Gyptian ship and tells Lyra the children are at a Magisterial experimental station in Bolvangar. In league with the Magisterium, Mrs. Coulter sends two venomous mechanical spy-flies after Lyra; one is caught by Farder Coram and sealed in a tin, but the other escapes.

Asriel reaches Svalbard, the Kingdom of the Ice Bears, but is captured by Samoyed tribesmen hired by Mrs. Coulter, and imprisoned by the Ice Bears’ king, Ragnar Sturlusson, who usurped the throne.

At Trollesund, Lyra befriends Texan aeronaut Lee Scoresby, who suggests she hire him and his friend Iorek Byrnison, an armoured bear. Once a prince of the Ice Bears, Iorek was defeated in combat and exiled in shame. After Farder and Lyra find Iorek and help him recover his armour, he and Scoresby join the Gyptian trek to Bolvangar.

Following directions from the alethiometer, Lyra finds Billy Costa in a stupor clutching a dried fish in place of his dæmon. The Gobblers have experimented on him using "intercision", which separated him from his dæmon. They return to the Gyptian camp, which is attacked by Samoyeds who capture Lyra. She is taken to the Ice Bear king, Ragnar, with Iorek and Lee in pursuit in Lee's hot air balloon. Lyra tricks Ragnar into single combat with Iorek, who kills Ragnar and reclaims the throne.

Iorek carries Lyra to Bolvangar, but she is forced to cross a chasm over a narrow ice bridge alone before it collapses. Reaching the station, Lyra reunites with Roger. Caught by scientists, Lyra and Pan are thrown into the intercision chamber, but are unconscious when they are rescued by Mrs. Coulter. Lyra wakes up in Mrs. Coulter’s quarters and she explains to Lyra that the Magisterium believe intercision protects children from Dust's corrupting influence, when their dæmon's form settles. Mrs. Coulter admits she could not let Lyra be intercised as she is her mother, who was forced to give her up; Lyra then realises Asriel is her father. Mrs. Coulter asks for the alethiometer, but Lyra gives her the sealed tin containing the spy-fly, which stuns her mother. Lyra destroys the intercision machine, then leads the children outside, where they are confronted by Tatar guards and their wolf dæmons. The guards are defeated by Iorek, Scoresby, the Gyptians, and witches led by Serafina.

Scoresby flies Lyra, Roger, Iorek, and Serafina north in his balloon in search of Asriel. Serafina relates a prophecy with Lyra at its crux in an upcoming war with the Magisterium, plotting to inflict their controlling Authority over all other worlds in the multiverse. Lyra commits to fighting the Magisterium.

== Cast ==
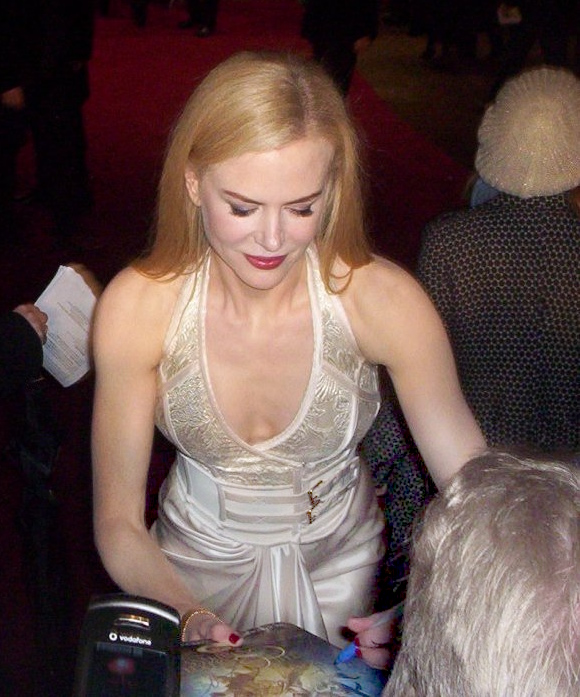
Nicole Kidman at the film's premiere.

- Dakota Blue Richards as Lyra Belacqua, an orphan and the ward of the Master of Jordan College, Oxford at the behest of her uncle, Lord Asriel, who embarks on a voyage to battle the forces of evil and rescue her best friend. New Line Cinema announced 11-year-old Richards' casting in June 2006. It was her first acting role.
- Nicole Kidman as Marisa Coulter, a beguiling and influential woman from the Magisterium with an unnamed, silent but aggressive golden monkey dæmon, who takes an interest in Lyra, because secretly she is her mother – a fact that is known only by a very few. Kidman was author Philip Pullman's preferred choice for the role ten years before production of the film, and despite initially rejecting the offer to star as she did not want to play a villain, she signed on after receiving a personal letter from Pullman.
- Daniel Craig as Lord Asriel, Lyra's strict and mysterious adventurer uncle, who is later revealed to be her father. In July 2006, it was reported that Paul Bettany was in talks to play the role.
- Sam Elliott as Lee Scoresby, a Texan aeronaut of a hot air balloon, who comes to Lyra's aid. Pullman has singled out Elliott's performance as one the film got "just right."
- Eva Green as Serafina Pekkala, a witch queen.
- Jim Carter as John Faa, the king of the Gyptians.
- Tom Courtenay as Farder Coram, Gyptian second-in-command and advisor to John Faa.
- Clare Higgins as Ma Costa, mother of Billy and Tony Costa and the matriarch of a Gyptian family that aids Lyra.
- Ben Walker as Roger Parslow, an orphaned kitchen boy at Jordan College, Oxford and Lyra's best friend, who is kidnapped by the Gobblers and taken away north to Bolvangar.
- Charlie Rowe as Billy Costa, son of Ma Costa and Tony Costa's younger brother, who is kidnapped by the Gobblers along with Roger and taken to Bolvangar.
- Steven Loton as Tony Costa, son of Ma Costa and Billy's older brother.
- Derek Jacobi as the Magisterial emissary.
- Christopher Lee as the Magisterium's first high councilor. Lee's casting was also at New Line's behest, rather than that of Chris Weitz.
- Simon McBurney as Fra Pavel, a Magisterial agent.
- Jack Shepherd as the Master, head of Jordan College.
- Magda Szubanski as Mrs Lonsdale, housekeeper in charge of Lyra at Jordan College.
- Hattie Morahan as Sister Clara, a nurse at the Bolvangar Station.
- Jason Watkins as a senior official at the Bolvangar Station.

=== Voice cast ===
- Ian McKellen as Iorek Byrnison, an armoured Ice Bear, panserbjørn, a skilled metalworker and warrior, who becomes Lyra's friend and comrade in arms. Nonso Anozie was initially cast and recorded lines for the part, but were replaced by McKellen at a late stage as New Line wanted a bigger name in the role. New Line president of production Toby Emmerich claimed that he "never thought Anozie sounded like Iorek" and while he initially trusted director Weitz's casting decision, he "never stopped thinking that this guy didn't sound right." The recasting was against Weitz's wishes, though he later said "if you're going to have anyone recast in your movie, you're happy it's Ian McKellen."
- Freddie Highmore as Pantalaimon, Lyra's dæmon taking many forms. Pan was originally to be voiced by an older actor, but they called in Highmore instead, as it would be more of an intimate relationship if Pan and Lyra were the same age, and also would underscore the contrast between Lyra's relationship with him versus her relationships with older male characters such as Lord Asriel, Lee Scoresby and Iorek.
- Ian McShane as Ragnar Sturlusson, King of the Panserbjørne. Ragnar's name in the book was Iofur Raknison, but the name was changed to prevent confusion between him and Iorek. However, in the German-language version of the film, the dialogue retains the name "Iofur Raknison", whilst the subtitles reflect the change.
- Kathy Bates as Hester, Lee Scoresby's hare (jackrabbit) dæmon.
- Kristin Scott Thomas as Stelmaria, Lord Asriel's snow leopard dæmon.

== Production ==
=== Development ===
"Peter's operation was so impressive that, well, I realised the distance between me and Peter Jackson... At that moment, I realised the sheer scope of the endeavor. And I thought, 'You know what? I can't do this'."
— Director Chris Weitz on his initial departure from the project

On 11 February 2002, following the success of New Line Cinema's The Lord of the Rings: The Fellowship of the Ring, the studio bought the rights to Philip Pullman's His Dark Materials trilogy. In July 2003, Tom Stoppard was commissioned to write the screenplay. Directors Brett Ratner and Sam Mendes expressed interest in the film, but a year later, Chris Weitz was hired to direct after approaching the studio with an unsolicited 40-page treatment. The studio rejected the script, asking Weitz to start from scratch. Since Weitz was an admirer of Stoppard's work, he decided not to read the adaptation in case he "subconsciously poached things from him." After delivering his script, Weitz cited Barry Lyndon and Star Wars as stylistic influences on the film. In 2004, Weitz was invited by The Lord of the Rings director Peter Jackson onto the set of King Kong (2005) in order to gather information on directing a big-budget film, and to receive advice on dealing with New Line Cinema, for whom Jackson had worked on Lord of the Rings. After a subsequent interview in which Weitz said the novel's attacks on organised religion would have to be softened, he was criticised by some fans, and on 15 December 2004, Weitz resigned as director of the trilogy, citing the enormous technical challenges of the epic. He later indicated that he had envisioned the possibility of being denounced by both the book's fans and its detractors, as well as a studio hoping for another Lord of the Rings.

On 9 August 2005, British director Anand Tucker took over from Weitz. Tucker felt the film would thematically be about Lyra "looking for a family", and Pullman agreed: "He has plenty of very good ideas, and he isn't daunted by the technical challenges. But the best thing from the point of view of all who care about the story is his awareness that it isn't about computer graphics; it isn't about fantastic adventures in amazing-looking worlds; it's about Lyra." Tucker resigned on 8 May 2006, citing creative disagreements with New Line, and Weitz returned to direct. Weitz said "I'm both the first and third director on the film ... but I did a lot of growing in the interim."

According to producer Deborah Forte, Tucker wanted to make a smaller, less exciting film than New Line wanted. New Line production president Toby Emmerich said of Weitz's return: "I think Chris realised that if he didn't come back in and step up, maybe the movie wasn't going to get made ... We really didn't have a Plan B at that point." Weitz was attracted back to the project after receiving a letter from Pullman asking him to reconsider. Since his departure, blueprints, production design and visual effects strategies had been put into position, and while Weitz admitted that his fears did not vanish, the project suddenly seemed feasible for the director.

=== Filming ===
Filming began at Shepperton Studios on 4 September 2006, with additional sequences shot in Switzerland and Norway. Filming also took place at the Old Royal Naval College at Greenwich, Chiswick House in London, and in Radcliffe Square, Christ Church, Oxford, Exeter College, Oxford, The Queen's College, Oxford, The Historic Dockyard Chatham and Hedsor House in Buckinghamshire.

=== Design ===
Production designer Dennis Gassner says of his work on the film:

The whole project is about translation—translation from something you would understand into something that is in a different vernacular. So, it's a new signature, looking into another world that seems familiar but is still unique. There's a term I use—called 'cludging'—it's taking one element and combining it with another element to make something new. It's a hybrid or amalgamation, and that's what this movie is about from a design perspective. It's about amalgamating ideas and concepts and theoretical and physical environments.

Rhythm & Hues Studios (R&H) created the main dæmons and Framestore CFC created all the bears. British company Cinesite created the secondary dæmons.

== Differences from the novel ==
Numerous scenes from the novel did not feature in the film or were markedly changed. On 7 December 2007, New York magazine reviewed draft scripts from both Stoppard and Weitz; both were significantly longer than the final version, and Weitz's draft (which, unlike Stoppard's, did not feature significant additions to the source material) was pronounced the best of the three. The magazine concluded that instead of a "likely three hours of running time" that included such scenes as Mrs. Coulter's London party and Lyra's meeting with a witch representative, the studio had opted for a "failed" length of under 2 hours in order to maximize revenue.

On 9 October 2007, Weitz revealed that the final 3 chapters from Northern Lights had been moved to the film's potential sequel, The Subtle Knife, in order to provide "the most promising conclusion to the first film and the best possible beginning to the second," though he also said less than a month later that there had been "tremendous marketing pressure" to create "an upbeat ending." (The San Francisco Chronicle found this "truncated" ending abrupt.) Author Pullman publicly supported these changes, saying that "every film has to make changes to the story that the original book tells—not to change the outcome, but to make it fit the dimensions and the medium of film." In addition to removing the novel's unsettling ending, the film reverses the order in which Lyra travels to Bolvangar, the Gobbler's outpost, and then Svalbard, the armoured bears' kingdom. (Neither deviation from the book features in Scholastic Publishing's The Golden Compass: The Story of the Movie novelisation.) In July 2009, Weitz told a Comic Con audience that the film had been "recut by [New Line], and my experience with it ended being quite a terrible one"; he also told Time magazine that he had felt that by "being faithful to the book I was working at odds with the studio."

Tasha Robinson of The A.V. Club argued that through the use of a spoken introduction and other exposition-filled dialogue, the film fails by "baldly revealing up front everything that the novel is trying to get you to wonder about and to explore slowly." Youyoung Lee wrote in a December 2007 Entertainment Weekly that the film "leaves out the gore", such as the book's ritualistic heart-eating that concludes the bear fight, "to create family-friendlier fare." Lee also said that the film "downplays the Magisterium's religious nature", but Robinson argued that the depiction of the church in the film is as "a hierarchical organisation of formally robed, iconography-heavy priests who dictate and define morality for their followers, are based out of cathedrals, and decry teachings counter to theirs as 'heresy.' ... doing ugly things to children under cover of secrecy." Robinson then asks, "Who are most people going to think of besides the Catholic Church?"

Although the character of Mrs. Coulter has black hair in the novel, Pullman responded to the blonde Kidman's portrayal by saying, "I was clearly wrong. You sometimes are wrong about your characters. She's blonde. She has to be."

== Controversies ==
Prior to release, the film faced criticism from secularist and religious organisations due to the source material's anti-religious themes. Several key themes of the novels, such as the rejection of religion and the abuse of power in a fictionalized version of the Church, were diluted in the adaptation. Director Weitz said that "in the books the Magisterium is a version of the Catholic Church gone wildly astray from its roots", but that the organization portrayed in his film would not directly match that of Pullman's books. Instead, the Magisterium represents all dogmatic organizations.

Attempting to reassure fans of the novels, Weitz said that religion would instead appear in euphemistic terms, yet the decision was criticized by some fans, anti-censorship groups, and the National Secular Society (of which Pullman is an honorary associate), which said "they are taking the heart out of it, losing the point of it, castrating it ..." and "this is part of a long-term problem over freedom of speech." The Atlantic wrote: "With $180 million at stake, the studio opted to kidnap the book's body and leave behind its soul." The changes from the novel have been present since Tom Stoppard's rejected version of the script, and Pullman expected the film to be "faithful", although he also said: "They do know where to put the theology and that's off the film." A Christianity Today review of the film noted that "'Magisterium' does refer, in the real world, to the teaching authority of the Catholic Church, and the film [is] peppered with religiously significant words like 'oblation' and 'heresy'", adding that when one character smashes through the wall of a Magisterium building, the damaged exterior is "decorated with [Christian] Byzantine icons."

On 7 October 2007, the Catholic League called for a boycott of the film. League president William A. Donohue said he would not ordinarily object to the film, but that while the religious elements are diluted from the source material, the film will encourage children to read the novels, which he says denigrate Christianity and promote atheism for children. He cited Pullman telling The Washington Post in 2001 that he is trying to undermine the basis of Christian belief. The league hoped that "the film [would fail] to meet box-office expectations and that [Pullman's] books attract few buyers", declaring the boycott campaign a success after a North American opening weekend which was lower than anticipated.

Albert Mohler, the president of the Southern Baptist Theological Seminary, agreed that the broad appeal of the film was a dangerous lure to the novels, which he criticised for carrying a clear agenda to expose what Pullman believes is the "tyranny of the Christian faith" and for providing "a liberating mythology for a new secular age." Denny Wayman of the Free Methodist Church made the assertion that The Golden Compass is a "film trying to preach an atheistic message." Other evangelical groups, such as the Christian Film and Television Commission, adopted a "wait-and-see" approach to the film before deciding upon any action, as did the Catholic Church in England and Wales. Theologian Donna Freitas argued that the books were "deeply theological, and deeply Christian in their theology". In November 2007, a review of the film by the director and staff reviewer of the Office for Film and Broadcasting of the United States Conference of Catholic Bishops (USCCB) appeared on the website of the Catholic News Service and in Catholic newspapers across the country. The review suggested that instead of a boycott, it may be appropriate for Catholic parents to "talk through any thorny philosophical issues" with their children. However, on 10 December 2007 the review was removed from the website at the USCCB's request. On 19 December 2007, the Vatican newspaper, L'Osservatore Romano, published an editorial in which it denounced the film as godless.

Pullman said of Donohue's call for a boycott, "Why don't we trust readers? Why don't we trust filmgoers? Oh, it causes me to shake my head with sorrow that such nitwits could be loose in the world." In a discussion with Donohue on CBS's Early Show, Ellen Johnson, president of American Atheists, said that rather than promote atheism, the film would encourage children to question authority, saying that would not be a bad thing for children to learn. Director Weitz says that he believes His Dark Materials is "not an atheistic work, but a highly spiritual and reverent piece of writing", and Nicole Kidman defended her decision to star in the film, saying that the source material had been "watered down a little" and that her religious beliefs would prevent her from taking a role in a film she perceived as anti-Catholic. Some commentators indicated that they believed both sides' criticism would prove ultimately impotent and that the negative publicity would prove a boon for the film's box-office. Sales were in fact poor; one week after the film's release, Roger Ebert said of the Catholic campaign, "any bad buzz on a family film can be mortal, and that seems to have been the case this time." The planned film trilogy has not been continued, prompting actor Sam Elliott to blame censorship and the Catholic Church.

== Release ==
=== Theatrical ===
The film premiered in London on 27 November 2007, and was released on 5 December 2007, in British cinemas by Entertainment Film Distributors and released on 7 December 2007, in American theaters by New Line Cinema.

=== Home media ===
The film was released on DVD and Blu-ray on 29 April 2008.

Shortly before the film's release, Weitz suggested that an extended cut of the film could be released on DVD, saying "I'd really love to do a fuller cut of the film"; he further speculated that such a version "could probably end up at two-and-a-half hours." This proposed cut would presumably not include the original ending: MTV reported in December 2007 that Weitz hoped to include that material at the beginning of a possible The Subtle Knife adaptation, and that a Compass Director's Cut might feature "a moment" of it as a "teaser." so far, however, no extended version has been released, as of 2014.

On 9 June 2020 Weitz revealed on Twitter that it would take $17 million for him to complete VFX for his directors cut making him think there is no financial incentive for them to finish it and release it.

== Reception ==
=== Box-office ===
The North American opening weekend return was "a little disappointing" for New Line Cinema, earning US$25.8 million with total domestic box-office of $70 million compared to an estimated $180 million production budget. Despite this, the film's fortunes rebounded as its performance outside the United States was described as "stellar" by Variety, and as "astonishing" by New Line Cinema. In the United Kingdom, the film grossed $53,198,635 and became the second-highest-grossing non-sequel of 2007 there (behind The Simpsons Movie). In Japan, the film was officially released in March 2008 on 700 screens, ultimately grossing $33,501,399; but previews of the film between 23 and 24 February 2008, earned $2.5 million. By 6 July 2008, it had earned $302,127,136 internationally, totaling $372,234,864 worldwide. Overseas rights to the film were sold to fund the $180 million production budget for the film, so most of these profits did not go to New Line Cinema. This has been cited as a possible "last straw" in Time Warner's decision to merge New Line Cinema into Warner Bros. Pictures.

=== Critical response ===
Reviews of The Golden Compass were mixed. On the review aggregator website Rotten Tomatoes, the film has an approval rating of 42%, based on 196 reviews, with an average score of 5.60/10. The critical consensus reads: "Without the bite or the controversy of the source material, The Golden Compass is reduced to impressive visuals overcompensating for lax storytelling." On Metacritic, the film has a weighted average score of 51 out of 100, based on reviews from 33 critics, indicating "mixed or average reviews". Audiences polled by CinemaScore gave the film an average grade of "B" on an A+ to F scale.

Manohla Dargis of The New York Times said that the film "crams so many events, characters, ... twists and turns, sumptuously appointed rooms and ethereally strange vistas ... that [it] risks losing you in the whirl" and that while The Golden Compass is "an honorable work," it is "hampered by its fealty to the book and its madly rushed pace." James Berardinelli of ReelReviews gave the film 2.5 stars out of 4, calling it "adequate, but not inspired" and criticising the first hour for its rushed pace and sketchily-developed characters. James Christopher of The Times of London was disappointed, praising the "marvellous" special effects and casting, but saying that the "books weave a magic the film simply cannot match" and citing a "lack of genuine drama."

Time rated it an "A−" and called it a "good, if familiar fantasy," saying "The find is Dakota Blue Richards ... who's both grounded and magical." Peter Bradshaw of The Guardian rated it 4 stars out of 5, praising Nicole Kidman's casting and saying it had "no other challengers as [2007's] big Christmas movie." Leonard Maltin gave the film 3 out of 4 stars, and said that "Richards is persuasive" and that it "does a good job of introducing us to an unfamiliar world." Critic Roger Ebert awarded the film 4 out of 4 stars and called it "a darker, deeper fantasy epic than the Rings trilogy, The Chronicles of Narnia or the Potter films," saying that it "creates villains that are more complex and poses more intriguing questions. As a visual experience, it is superb. As an escapist fantasy, it is challenging ... I think [it] is a wonderfully good-looking movie, with exciting passages and a captivating heroine."

Pullman was described by an interviewer from The Times in Britain as sounding "ambivalent" and "guarded" about the film, saying in March 2008: "A lot of things about it were good... Nothing's perfect. Nothing can bring out all that's in the book. There are always compromises." He hoped, however, that the rest of the trilogy would be adapted with the same cast and crew. In July 2009, after this possibility had been exhausted, Weitz told Time magazine that he thought the film's special effects ended up being its "most successful element."

Debbie Day of Premiere magazine said "The Golden Compass ultimately fails as a film in its broad strokes and inadequate scene development."

=== Accolades ===
The Golden Compass won the 2008 Academy Award for Best Visual Effects and the BAFTA Film Award for Special Visual Effects notably beating what many considered to be the front-runner, Michael Bay's Transformers, which had swept the VES awards prior. It was also nominated for 2 Critics' Choice Awards in 2007 ("Best Family Film," and "Best Young Actress" for Dakota Blue Richards), 5 Satellite Awards and the Hugo Award for Best Dramatic Presentation, Long Form. The Golden Compass was nominated for the National Movie Award for Best Family Film, but lost to Disney/Pixar's WALL-E.

Award	Category	Nominee	Result
Academy Awards	Best Art Direction	Dennis Gassner (art director); Anna Pinnock (set decorator)	Nominated
Academy Awards	Best Visual Effects	Michael L. Fink; Bill Westenhofer; Ben Morris; Trevor Wood	Won
BAFTA Awards	Best Special Visual Effects	Michael L. Fink; Bill Westenhofer; Ben Morris; Trevor Wood	Won
Saturn Awards	Best Fantasy Film		Nominated
Saturn Awards	Best Performance by a Younger Actor	Dakota Blue Richards	Nominated
Saturn Awards	Best Costume	Ruth Myers	Nominated
Saturn Awards	Best Special Effects	Michael L. Fink; Bill Westenhofer; Ben Morris; Trevor Wood	Nominated
Excellence in Production; Design Awards	Fantasy Film	Dennis Gassner (production designer); Richard L. Johnson (supervising art director); Chris Lowe (art director); Andy Nicholson (art director); Tino Schaedler (art director - digital sets); James Foster (standby art director); Gavin Fitch (assistant art director); Helen Xenopoulos (assistant art director)	Won
Critics' Choice Movie Awards	Best Young Actress	Dakota Blue Richards	Nominated
Critics' Choice Movie Awards	Best Family Film		Nominated
Golden Trailer Awards	Best Animation/Family TV Spot		Nominated
Golden Trailer Awards	Best Animation/Family Poster		Nominated
Hugo Awards	Best Dramatic Presentation - Long Form	Chris Weitz (written by/director); Philip Pullman (based on the novel by)	Nominated
IFMCA Awards	Best Original Score for a Fantasy/Science Fiction Film	Alexandre Desplat	Won
IFMCA Awards	Film Score of the Year	Alexandre Desplat	Nominated
ALFS Awards	British Breakthrough - Acting	Dakota Blue Richards	Nominated
Golden Reel Awards	Best Sound Editing - Music in a Feature Film	Gerard McCann (supervising music editor); Peter Clarke (music editor); Robert Houston (additional music editor); Andrew Dudman (additional music editor); Sam Okell (additional music editor); Stuart Morton (additional music editor)	Nominated
National Movie Awards	Best Family Film		Nominated
National Movie Awards	Best Performance - Female	Nicole Kidman	Nominated
National Movie Awards	Best Performance - Female	Dakota Blue Richards	Nominated
Satellite Awards	Best Motion Picture, Animated or Mixed Media		Nominated
Satellite Awards	Best Cinematography	Henry Braham	Nominated
Satellite Awards	Best Original Song	Kate Bush (for the song "Lyra")	Nominated
Satellite Awards	Best Sound	Mike Prestwood Smith; Mark Taylor; Glenn Freemantle	Nominated
Satellite Awards	Best Visual Effects	Michael L. Fink; Bill Westenhofer; Ben Morris; Trevor Wood	Nominated
Visual Effects Society Awards	Outstanding Visual Effects in an Effects Driven Motion Picture	Michael L. Fink; Bill Westenhofer; Ben Morris; Trevor Wood	Nominated
World Soundtrack Awards	Soundtrack Composer of the Year	Alexandre Desplat	Nominated
Taurus Awards	Best High Work	Paul Herbert; Nicholas Daines	Nominated
Young Artist Awards	Best Family Feature Film (Fantasy or Musical)		Nominated
Young Artist Awards	Best Performance in a Feature Film - Leading Young Actress	Dakota Blue Richards	Nominated

== Music ==
French composer Alexandre Desplat composed the film's music. British singer Kate Bush wrote and performed the song "Lyra" which is played over the end credits. The film's soundtrack album was released on 11 December 2007, by New Line Records.

== Video game ==
The video game for this film was released in November 2007 in Europe and December 2007 in North America and Australia for the PC, Wii, PlayStation 2, PlayStation 3, PlayStation Portable, Nintendo DS and the Xbox 360. It was developed by Shiny Entertainment and published by Sega.

Players take control of the characters Lyra Belacqua and Iorek Byrnison in Lyra's attempt to save her friend Roger from the General Oblation Board. As this game does not fully take into account the changes made by the final version of the film, a small amount of footage from the film's deleted ending can be viewed near the end of the game, and the order in which Lyra travels to Bolvangar and Svalbard follows the book and not the film.

== Future ==
=== Cancelled sequels ===
At the time of The Golden Compass's theatrical release, Weitz pledged to "protect [the] integrity" of the prospective sequels by being "much less compromising" in the book-to-film adaptation process. New Line Cinema commissioned Hossein Amini to write a screenplay based on the second book in the trilogy, The Subtle Knife, potentially for release in May 2010, with the third book of the trilogy, The Amber Spyglass, to follow. However, New Line president Toby Emmerich stressed that production of the second and third films was dependent on the financial success of The Golden Compass. When The Golden Compass did not meet expectations at the United States box-office, the likelihood of a sequel was downplayed by New Line. According to studio co-head Michael Lynne, "The jury is still very much out on the movie, and while it's performed very strongly overseas, we'll look at it early 2008 and see where we're going with a sequel."

In February 2008, Weitz told The Daily Yomiuri, a Japanese newspaper, that he still hoped for the sequels' production: "at first it looked like we were down for the count because in the U.S. [the film] underperformed, but then internationally it performed [better] than expectations. So, a lot depends on Japan, frankly... I think if it does well enough here we'll be in good shape for that." Although producer Deborah Forte had, in March 2008, expressed optimism that the sequels would be made, by October 2008, the two planned sequels were officially placed on hold, according to New Line Cinema, because of financial concerns during the global recession. Sam Elliott, however, stated, "The Catholic Church ... lambasted them, and I think it scared New Line off."

=== Television reboot ===
From 2019, 12 years after the film's disappointment that caused the two sequels to be scrapped, a three-season television series adaptation of all three novels of His Dark Materials was made, culminating in 2022. It starred Dafne Keen as Lyra and Ruth Wilson as Mrs Coulter. It was produced by Bad Wolf and New Line Productions and was broadcast on both BBC One and HBO. The series followed the novels more closely, retaining more nuances of the story-line, and received a much better reception than the film adaptation.

== See also ==
- List of films about witchcraft
