= The Last Supper (2025 film) =

2025 biblical drama film

- Theatrical release poster
- Directed by: Mauro Borrelli
- Screenplay by: Mauro Borrelli; John Collins
- Based on: The Last Supper in the New Testament of the Bible
- Produced by: Michael Scott; Shawn Boskie; Kenneth Halsband; Ivan Cohen; Manu Gargi
- Starring: James Oliver Wheatley; Jamie Ward; Charlie MacGechan; Nathalie Rapti Gomez; Robert Knepper; James Faulkner
- Cinematography: Vladislav Opelyants
- Edited by: Vance Null
- Music by: Leo Z
- Production companies: Pinnacle Peak Pictures; Canyon Productions; Grand Canyon University; Great American/Pure Flix; Wellspring Entertainment; Skyrun Pictures
- Distributed by: Pinnacle Peak Pictures
- Release date: March 14, 2025
- Running time: 114 minutes
- Country: United States
- Language: English
- Box office: $6.6 million

The Last Supper is a 2025 American Christian drama film co-written and directed by Mauro Borrelli. It stars James Oliver Wheatley, Jamie Ward, Charlie MacGechan, Nathalie Rapti Gomez, Robert Knepper, and James Faulkner. Chris Tomlin is one of the executive producers. The film was released on March 14, 2025, by Pinnacle Peak Pictures.

== Plot ==
The film is about the last days of Jesus.

== Cast ==
- James Oliver Wheatley as Saint Peter
- Jamie Ward as Jesus Christ
- Charlie MacGechan as John the Apostle
- Nathalie Rapti Gomez as Mary Magdalene
- Robert Knepper as Judas Iscariot
- James Faulkner as Caiaphas
- Henry Garrett as Nicodemus
- Mayssae El Halla as Mary, mother of Jesus
- Daniel Fathers as Joseph of Arimathea
- Harry Anton as Simon the Zealot

== Reception ==
=== Box office ===
In the United States and Canada, The Last Supper opened alongside Novocaine, The Day the Earth Blew Up: A Looney Tunes Movie, Black Bag, and Opus, and grossed $2.8 million, finishing sixth at the box office during the weekend of March 14–16.

=== Critical response ===
Audiences polled by CinemaScore gave the film an average grade of "A–" on an A+ to F scale.

== See also ==
- List of films based on the Bible
