= Rest and Relaxation =

- Teaser poster
- Directed by: Rebecca Rajadnya
- Written by: Rebecca Rajadnya
- Produced by: Adam Chitayat; Amanda Jabes; Christine Taylor
- Starring: Sunita Mani; Christine Taylor; Scott Cohen; Nicholas Podany; Christopher Egan; Zenobia Shroff
- Cinematography: Aaron Kovalchik
- Edited by: Yuval Shapira; Aacharee Ungsriwong
- Music by: Elijah Fox
- Production company: Tiny Office Productions
- Country: United States
- Language: English

Rest and Relaxation is an upcoming American coming-of-age drama film written and directed by Rebecca Rajadnya. It stars Sunita Mani, Christine Taylor, Scott Cohen, Nicholas Podany, Christopher Egan, and Zenobia Shroff.

== Premise ==
Seeking solace at a secluded bed and breakfast, Amandeep encounters eclectic guests who challenge her preconceptions of family and force her to reckon with future uncertainties head on.

== Cast ==
- Sunita Mani as Amandeep
- Christine Taylor as Joanie Danver
- Scott Cohen
- Nicholas Podany
- Christopher Egan
- Zenobia Shroff as Roshni
- Daniel K. Isaac as Daniel
- Kathryn Gallagher
- Isa Mooney as Liz
- Gemma Mchilhenny

== Production ==
In July 2020, it was reported that a coming-of-age drama film written and directed by Rebecca Rajadnya was in development. By August 21, 2025, principal photography had begun, with Sunita Mani cast in the lead role as Amandeep. Filming took place in the Catskill Mountains and wrapped a month later, with Christine Taylor, Scott Cohen, Nicholas Podany, Christopher Egan, Zenobia Shroff, Daniel K. Isaac, Kathryn Gallagher, Isa Mooney, and Gemma Mchilhenny rounding out the cast. Aaron Kovalchik served as the cinematographer. Yuval Shapira and Aacharee Ungsriwong edited the film.
