= Juliet & Romeo (film) =

2025 American musical film

- Theatrical release poster
- Directed by: Timothy Scott Bogart
- Written by: Timothy Scott Bogart
- Based on: Romeo and Juliet by William Shakespeare
- Produced by: Timothy Scott Bogart; Jessica Martins; Chris Torto; Bradley Bogart; Andrea Iervolino
- Starring: Clara Rugaard; Jamie Ward; Jason Isaacs; Tayla Parx; Dan Fogler; Nicholas Podany; Ferdia Walsh-Peelo; Rupert Graves; Martina Ortiz Luis; Alex Grech; Dennis Andres; Ledisi; Max Parker; Zac Bellward; Rebel Wilson; Rupert Everett; Derek Jacobi
- Cinematography: Byron Werner
- Edited by: Camilla Toniolo; Andrea Bottari
- Music by: Evan Kidd Bogart; Justin Gray
- Production companies: Hero Entertainment Partners; Rainmaker Films; Iervolino & Lady Bacardi Entertainment
- Distributed by: Briarcliff Entertainment
- Release date: May 9, 2025
- Running time: 122 minutes
- Countries: Italy; United States
- Language: English
- Box office: $548,029

Juliet & Romeo is a 2025 musical romantic drama film written, co-produced, and directed by Timothy Scott Bogart, based on the play Romeo and Juliet by William Shakespeare.

The film received negative reviews from critics.

== Cast ==
- Clara Rugaard as Juliet
- Jamie Ward as Romeo
- Jason Isaacs as Lord Montague
- Tayla Parx as Rosaline
- Dan Fogler as The Apothecary
- Nicholas Podany as Mercutio
- Ferdia Walsh-Peelo as Tybalt
- Rupert Graves as Prince Escalus
- Iara del Bustio as Prince Escalus's herald
- Martina Ortiz Luis as Veronica
- Alex Grech as Tommaso
- Dennis Andres as Lord Paris
- Ledisi as Vesante
- Max Parker as Benvolio
- Zac Bellward as Leopold
- Rebel Wilson as Lady Capulet
- Rupert Everett as Lord Capulet
- Derek Jacobi as The Friar

== Musical numbers ==
1. "Stranger" – Romeo, Juliet
2. "What If I Loved You" – The Apothecary, Veronica, Mercutio, Romeo
3. "Better Than This" – Veronica, Cast
4. "Beat the Same" – Romeo, Juliet
5. "I Should Write This Down" – The Apothecary, The Friar
6. "The Mask I Wear" – Juliet, Rosaline, Vesante, Lady Capulet, Veronica
7. "Don't Look Down" – Juliet, Romeo
8. "Beat the Same" (Reprise)† – Juliet, Romeo
9. "Secrets" – Juliet, Romeo
10. "Streets on Fire" – Tybalt, Mercutio, Rosaline, Vesante (Note: Verses by Juliet, Romeo, and Benvolio are absent in the film.)
11. "Someone to Love Again" – Veronica, Rosaline, Romeo, Juliet
12. "Conversations" – Romeo, Juliet
13. "This Time" – Juliet
14. "In the End" – Romeo, Juliet
15. "Beat the Same" (Finale) – Romeo, Juliet
16. "What If I Loved You" (end credits) – Veronica, Mercutio, Romeo

† denotes songs absent from the soundtrack.

== Production ==
The film is a modern reimagining of the original play Romeo and Juliet (1597) by William Shakespeare. It is written and directed by Timothy Scott Bogart. Producers include Bogart, Jessica Martins and Chris Torto. It features a soundtrack co-created and overseen by E. Kidd Bogart.

The film was originally announced with the title Verona, then Verona's Romeo & Juliet. Jamie Ward and Clara Rugaard were cast as Romeo and Juliet in February 2023. Other cast members announced included Rebel Wilson, Rupert Everett, Jason Isaacs and Derek Jacobi. Also cast that month were Dan Fogler, Ledisi, Tayla Parx, Ferdia Walsh-Peelo and Rupert Graves.

Principal photography was reported to have completed by mid-March 2023. Filming took place on-location in Italy in Verona and Castle of Torrechiara.

== Soundtrack ==
Juliet & Romeo (Original Motion Picture Soundtrack)
| No. | Title | Artist(s) | Length |
|---|---|---|---|
| 1. | "Stranger" | Jamie Ward; Clara Rugaard | 3:34 |
| 2. | "What If I Loved You" | Dan Fogler; Martina Ortiz Luis; Nicholas Podany; Ward | 3:22 |
| 3. | "Better Than This" | Ortiz Luis; Cast | 3:41 |
| 4. | "Beat the Same" | Ward; Rugaard | 3:45 |
| 5. | "I Should Write This Down" | Fogler; Derek Jacobi | 3:03 |
| 6. | "I Should Write This Down (Friar Reprise)†" | Jacobi | 1:36 |
| 7. | "The Mask I Wear" | Rugaard; Tayla Parx; Ledisi; Rebel Wilson; Ortiz Luis; Quinn Bogart | 4:19 |
| 8. | "Don't Look Down" | Rugaard; Ward | 3:57 |
| 9. | "Secrets" | Rugaard; Ward | 3:15 |
| 10. | "Streets on Fire" | Ferdia Walsh-Peelo; Parx; Ledisi; Rugaard; Podany; Ward; Max Parker | 3:16 |
| 11. | "Conversations" | Ward; Rugaard | 3:33 |
| 12. | "Someone to Love Again" | Parx; Rugaard; Ortiz Luis; Ward | 4:28 |
| 13. | "This Time" | Rugaard | 2:28 |
| 14. | "In the End" | Rugaard; Ward | 1:55 |
| 15. | "Beat the Same (Reprise)" | Rugaard; Ward | 4:24 |
| Total length: | | | 50:36 |

† denotes songs absent from the final film.

== Release ==
The film's title was changed from Verona to Verona's Romeo & Juliet, and later to Juliet & Romeo. It was released in North America by Briarcliff Entertainment on May 9, 2025.

== Reception ==
=== Critical response ===
On the review aggregator website Rotten Tomatoes, 26% of 35 critics' reviews are positive, with an average rating of 4.2/10. The website's consensus reads: "Wherefore art thou, good movie?" Metacritic, which uses a weighted average, assigned the film a score of 31 out of 100, based on 9 critics, indicating "generally unfavorable" reviews.

Courtney Howard of Variety wrote, "Improperly developed, poorly executed and containing no indelible music numbers for us to tap our toes to, this La La Land-wannabe take on the Bard's story serves to frustrate and bore."

William Bibbiani of TheWrap wrote, "It seems like an earnest attempt to tell an old story in a slightly new way. The problem is it's an ill-advised attempt. Maybe I'm overthinking it, but to quote Shakespeare, 'Teach me how to forget to think.' I can't help but think, no one can, and I can't help but think rather poorly of this re-telling. Never was a film I'm more likely to forget, than this of Romeo and his Juliet."

=== Box office ===
The film opened in 1,350 theaters and grossed $289,489 on its opening weekend, an average of $214 per venue.
