= His Dark Materials (TV series) =

2019 British fantasy television series

- Genre: Adventure; Fantasy drama; Mystery
- Based on: His Dark Materials by Philip Pullman
- Written by: Jack Thorne
- Starring: Dafne Keen; Ruth Wilson; Anne-Marie Duff; Clarke Peters; James Cosmo; Ariyon Bakare; Will Keen; Lucian Msamati; Gary Lewis; Lewin Lloyd; Daniel Frogson; James McAvoy; Georgina Campbell; Lin-Manuel Miranda; Ruta Gedmintas; Lia Williams; Amir Wilson; Nina Sosanya; Jade Anouka; Sean Gilder; Simone Kirby; Andrew Scott; Adewale Akinnuoye-Agbaje; Jonathan Aris; Chipo Chung; Simon Harrison; Kobna Holdbrook-Smith; Jamie Ward; Amber Fitzgerald-Woolfe; Sian Clifford; Alex Hassell
- Composer: Lorne Balfe
- Countries of origin: United Kingdom; United States
- Original language: English
- No. of series: 3
- No. of episodes: 23

Production
- Executive producers: Jane Tranter; Dan McCulloch; Otto Bathurst; Carolyn Blackwood; Joel Collins; Toby Emmerich; Deborah Forte; Julie Gardner; Tom Hooper; Ben Irving; Philip Pullman; Ryan Rasmussen; Jack Thorne
- Producer: Laurie Borg
- Editors: Niven Howie; Nick Arthurs; Dan Roberts; Chris Gill; David Fisher
- Running time: 47–59 minutes
- Production companies: BBC Studios; Bad Wolf; New Line Productions; Scholastic

Original release
- Network: BBC One (United Kingdom); HBO (United States)
- Release: 3 November 2019 – 18 December 2022 (Note: The third series premiered first on HBO on 5 December 2022, with weekly releases following. The series was released in full on BBC iPlayer on 18 December 2022.)

His Dark Materials is a fantasy drama television series based on the trilogy of novels by Philip Pullman. It is produced by Bad Wolf and New Line Productions, for BBC One and HBO, with the latter handling international distribution. The show follows the orphan Lyra Belacqua as she searches for a missing friend and discovers a kidnapping plot related to an invisible cosmic substance called Dust.

The eight-episode first series premiered on 3 November 2019 on BBC One in the United Kingdom, and on 4 November on HBO in the United States and other markets. The seven-episode second series premiered on 8 November 2020 in the UK, and on 16 November 2020 in the US. The eight-episode third and final series premiered first on HBO on 5 December 2022, and on 18 December 2022 in the UK. All three series received generally positive reviews, with praise going towards its cast, visuals, production values, musical score and its faithfulness to the source material.

== Premise ==
His Dark Materials is set in a multi-world reality, with the action moving from one world to another. The series is based on Philip Pullman's trilogy of the same name, and opens in an alternative world where all humans' souls manifest as animal companions called daemons. It follows the life of a young girl named Lyra, an orphan living with the scholars at Jordan College, Oxford, in a world governed by the Magisterium, a religious and political body. Lyra discovers a dangerous secret that involves Lord Asriel and Marisa Coulter, and is the subject of a witches' prophecy that she will change the world. In her search for a missing friend, Lyra also uncovers a series of kidnappings and a link to a mysterious substance called Dust, which leads her on a journey of epic proportions and ultimately to other worlds. The witches' prophecy also links Lyra's destiny to Will Parry, a teenager from the conventional world, who is himself being pursued by figures connected to his long-lost father.

== Cast ==
=== Main cast ===
- Dafne Keen as Lyra Belacqua (later known as Lyra Silvertongue), a girl who was raised at Jordan College
- Ruth Wilson as Marisa Coulter, a powerful figure at the Magisterium who is Lyra's mother
- Anne-Marie Duff as Maggie "Ma" Costa, a Gyptian woman who previously nursed Lyra (series 1)
- Clarke Peters as The Master of Jordan College (series 1)
- James Cosmo as Farder Coram van Texel, an elderly Gyptian and Serafina's former lover (series 1)
- Ariyon Bakare as Lord Carlo Boreal, an authoritative figure at the Magisterium who crosses between two worlds; in Will's world, he is known as Sir Charles Latrom (series 1–2)
- Will Keen as Father Hugh MacPhail (later Cardinal and Father President), a Magisterium official
- Lucian Msamati as Lord John Faa, of the Western Gyptians (series 1)
- Gary Lewis as Thorold, Asriel's assistant (series 1–2)
- Lewin Lloyd as Roger Parslow, a kitchen boy who is Lyra's best friend (series 1 and 3; guest series 2)
- Daniel Frogson as Tony Costa, Ma Costa's elder son (series 1)
- James McAvoy as Lord Asriel Belacqua, a scholar and explorer who is Lyra's father, and leads the resistance against the Authority (series 1 and 3; guest series 2)
- Georgina Campbell as Adele Starminster, a reporter (series 1)
- Lin-Manuel Miranda as Lee Scoresby, an aeronaut
- Ruta Gedmintas as Serafina Pekkala, a witch who is the Queen of the Lake Enara witches, and Coram's former lover
- Lia Williams as Dr Cooper, a Magisterium scientist operating at Bolvangar, and later in Geneva (series 1 and 3)
- Amir Wilson as Will Parry, a secondary school student from Oxford, whose father disappeared 13 years previously
- Nina Sosanya as Elaine Parry, Will's sick mother (series 1–2; guest series 3)
- Jade Anouka as Ruta Skadi, a witch queen and a former lover of Lord Asriel (series 2–3)
- Sean Gilder as Father Graves, a member of the Magisterium (series 2)
- Simone Kirby as Dr Mary Malone, a physicist from Will's world (series 2–3)
- Andrew Scott as Colonel John Parry, a marine and explorer who is Will's father; in Lyra's world, he is known as a shaman named Stanislaus Grumman (series 2–3; guest series 1)
- Terence Stamp as Giacomo Paradisi, the bearer of the subtle knife residing in Cittàgazze (series 2)
- Adewale Akinnuoye-Agbaje as Ogunwe, a resistance fighter recruited by Lord Asriel (series 3)
- Jonathan Aris as Commander Roke, an inches-tall Gallivespian who works as Lord Asriel's spy (series 3)
- Chipo Chung (series 3) and Sophie Okonedo (voice cast series 2) as Xaphania, an angel allied with Lord Asriel
- Simon Harrison as Baruch, an angel who seeks Will to recruit him to Lord Asriel's cause (series 3)
- Kobna Holdbrook-Smith as Balthamos, Baruch's companion (series 3)
- Jamie Ward as Father Gomez, a member of the Magisterium (series 3)
- Amber Fitzgerald-Woolfe as Ama, a deaf girl who brings supplies to Mrs Coulter while she is in hiding (series 3)
- Sian Clifford as Agent Salmakia, a Gallivespian spy (series 3)
- Alex Hassell as Metatron, the Authority's regent (series 3)

=== Voice cast ===
- Helen McCrory (series 1–2) and Victoria Hamilton (series 3) as Stelmaria, Asriel's snow leopard daemon
- Kit Connor as Pantalaimon, or Pan, Lyra's daemon. When Lyra was a child, Pan had the ability to shape-shift into different animals, although his most common form was a white ermine. In season 3, Pan eventually settled in the form of a pine marten.
- Eloise Little as Salcilia, Roger's daemon (series 1)
- Phoebe Scholfield as Alicia, the Master's raven daemon (series 1)
- Libby Rodliffe as Lyuba, Tony Costa's daemon (series 1)
- Cristela Alonzo as Hester, Lee Scoresby's jackrabbit daemon (series 1–2)
- David Suchet as Kaisa, Serafina Pekkala's gyrfalcon daemon, (as opposed to the book's snow goose)
- Joe Tandberg as Iorek Byrnison (voice and motion capture), an armoured polar bear.
- Peter Serafinowicz (voice) and Joi Johannsson (motion capture) as the ice bear, Iofur Raknison (series 1)
- Sope Dirisu as Sergi, Ruta Skadi's raptor daemon (series 2–3), (as opposed to the book's bluethroat)
- Lindsay Duncan as Octavia, Father MacPhail's lizard daemon (series 2–3)
- Phoebe Waller-Bridge as Sayan Kötör, John Parry's osprey daemon (series 2)
- Kate Ashfield as Atal, a Mulefa (series 3)
- Emma Tate as Gracious Wings and her fellow harpies who guard the Land of the Dead (series 3)
- Patricia Allison as Kirjava, Will's cat daemon (series 3)
- Tuppence Middleton as Father Gomez's spider daemon (series 3)

Additionally, lead puppeteer Brian Fisher provides the uncredited vocalisations for Mrs Coulter's golden snub-nosed monkey daemon.

=== Recurring cast ===
- Simon Manyonda as Benjamin de Ruyter, a Gyptian who aids Tony Costa (series 1)
- Geoff Bell as Jack Verhoeven (series 1)
- Tyler Howitt as Billy Costa, a Gyptian boy captured by the Gobblers and Ma Costa's younger son (series 1)
- Mat Fraser as Raymond van Gerrit, a Gyptian who disagrees with John Faa (series 1)
- Ian Peck as Cardinal Sturrock, the head of the Magisterium (series 1–2)
- David Langham as Father Garret
- Robert Emms as Thomas, an agent working for Boreal who spies on Will's family (series 1)
- Morfydd Clark as Sister Clara (series 1)
- Frank Bourke as Fra Pavel Rasek, a representative and alethiometrist of the Consistorial Court of Discipline
- Jamie Wilkes as Inspector Walters, "the pale-faced man" and an associate of Boreal and Thomas (series 1–2)
- Ray Fearon as Mr Hanway, Will's school boxing coach (series 1; guest series 2)
- Remmie Milner as Lena Feldt, a witch who accompanies Serafina in finding Lyra (series 2)
- Bella Ramsey as Angelica, a girl living in Cittàgazze (series 2)
- Ella Schrey-Yeats as Paola, Angelica's sister (series 2)
- Sasha Frost as Reina Miti, a witch who accompanies Serafina in finding Lyra (series 2)
- Lewis MacDougall as Tullio, a boy living in Cittàgazze who stole the Subtle Knife and is the brother of Angelica and Paola (series 2)
- Lauren Grace as Joseph, a young woman in Ogunwe's army who remains in his world and encounters Mary (series 3)
- Sorcha Groundsell as Maddy, Joseph's sister who remains with her in Ogunwe's world (series 3)
- Wade Briggs as Alarbus, an archangel who is captured by Asriel (series 3)
- Peter Wight as the boatman who takes Lyra and Will to the Land of the Dead (series 3)

== Episodes ==
Series	Episodes	Originally released		Ave. UK viewers (millions)	Ave. US viewers (millions)
Series	Episodes	First released	Last released	Ave. UK viewers (millions)	Ave. US viewers (millions)
1	8	3 November 2019	22 December 2019	7.063	0.423
2	7	8 November 2020	20 December 2020	4.923	0.246
3	8	5 December 2022	26 December 2022	3.368	0.149

=== Series 1 (2019) ===
No. overall	No. in series	Title	Directed by	Written by	Original release date	Viewers (millions)
1	1	"Lyra's Jordan"	Tom Hooper	Jack Thorne	3 November 2019 (UK)	9.723 (UK)
1	1	"Lyra's Jordan"	Tom Hooper	Jack Thorne	4 November 2019 (US)	0.424 (US)
Young Lyra Belacqua is raised as a ward of Jordan College in Oxford. Her closest friends are her daemon Pantalaimon ("Pan") and a servant boy named Roger Parslow. Lyra admires her uncle, Lord Asriel (who has a snow leopard daemon named Stelmaria), a polar explorer whose research into Dust and parallel worlds is regarded as heretical by the ruling Magisterium. Lyra saves Asriel from being poisoned by the Master of Jordan College, who foresees Lyra's future importance through an alethiometer, an instrument belonging to Lord Asriel and one of only six ever made. After Asriel leaves on another polar expedition, Marisa Coulter, also an explorer, arrives. She offers to mentor Lyra and promises to search for Roger, who has been kidnapped by the mysterious "Gobblers": the second recent such disappearance, after the Gyptian boy Billy Costa. The Master gives Lyra the alethiometer, saying that it tells the truth and is for her protection. She must figure out how to use it and tell no one she has it, including Mrs Coulter. Lyra accompanies Mrs Coulter to London hoping to search for Roger. Meanwhile, the Gyptians pursue the Gobblers to London.
2	2	"The Idea of North"	Tom Hooper (Note: Additional direction by William McGregor)	Jack Thorne	10 November 2019 (UK)	7.708 (UK)
2	2	"The Idea of North"	Tom Hooper	Jack Thorne	11 November 2019 (US)	0.369 (US)
Lyra settles into Mrs Coulter's luxurious London apartment, assured that her benefactress is actively searching for Roger. The Gyptians' attempt to rescue the missing children fails. At Oxford, the Master of Jordan College denies Lord Boreal, a Consistorial Court priest, access to what is believed to be Stanislaus Grumman's severed head that Asriel recently found in the north. Boreal travels through a portal to an alternate Oxford. He hires Thomas, a mercenary, to find Grumman. Lyra grows wary of Mrs Coulter's nameless monkey daemon, which never speaks, and her close Magisterium ties. When Lyra is caught eavesdropping on Mrs Coulter and Father MacPhail, Mrs Coulter's daemon attacks Pan. Mrs Coulter inadvertently reveals that Lord Asriel is Lyra's father. Mrs Coulter secretly visits Roger, Billy, and the other kidnapped children, saying they are going on an adventure to "the North". Lyra discovers that Mrs Coulter heads the General Oblation Board of London (GOB). During a party at Mrs Coulter's apartment, journalist Adele Starminster confirms to Lyra that the Oblation Board is known as "Gobblers", prompting Lyra and Pan to flee with the alethiometer. Boreal later crushes Adele's daemon, killing her. Lyra and Pan are captured by a Gobbler.
3	3	"The Spies"	Dawn Shadforth	Jack Thorne	17 November 2019 (UK)	7.216 (UK)
3	3	"The Spies"	Dawn Shadforth	Jack Thorne	18 November 2019 (US)	0.348 (US)
Tony Costa and Benjamin rescue Lyra from the Gobblers and bring her to the Gyptians' camp. Lyra accepts their protection, and agrees to help find Roger and the other missing children. Mrs Coulter learns that Lyra has an alethiometer and sends two robotic "spy-flies" to track her. Boreal crosses back to the alternate world, where Thomas informs him that Grumman is an explorer named John Parry who has a wife and son. Boreal hires another man to find them. Ma Costa reveals that Mrs Coulter is Lyra's mother. Asriel killed Mrs Coulter's husband when he tried to take revenge for their affair. Lyra was kept hidden at Jordan College. Lyra helps the Gyptian king, John Faa, to persuade the others to travel North and find the captive children. Tony and Benjamin raid Mrs Coulter's apartment, finding a list of missing children, including Billy Costa. The boys are discovered; Tony narrowly escapes but Benjamin is killed. Lyra can intuitively read the alethiometer, which says Benjamin is dead. She is attacked by the spy-flies. Farder Coram captures one spy-fly, but the other returns to Mrs Coulter, divulging Lyra's location.
4	4	"Armour"	Otto Bathurst	Jack Thorne	24 November 2019 (UK)	6.876 (UK)
4	4	"Armour"	Otto Bathurst	Jack Thorne	25 November 2019 (US)	0.396 (US)
Texan aeronaut Lee Scoresby and his daemon Hester travel to Trollesund in the Far North seeking Iorek Byrnison, a disgraced armoured bear. Trollesund's Magisterium citizens stole his armour several years earlier, forcing him to work as an indentured labourer. Lyra and the Gyptians sail to Trollesund to search for the kidnapped children. Farder Coram contacts his former lover, a witch queen named Serafina Pekkala; her daemon, Kaisa, promises that Serafina will help the Gyptians. Though the Gyptian elders believe Iorek is untrustworthy, Lyra and Scoresby enlist Iorek's help in finding the children. With Lyra's assistance, Iorek recovers his armour locked inside a church. Iorek and Scoresby join Lyra and the Gyptians as they travel north. Meanwhile, a Magisterium priest attempts to replace Mrs Coulter as head of the Gobblers with Father MacPhail. She offers to give Lord Asriel to the Magisterium. He is being held prisoner by Iofur Raknison, the king of the armoured bears. In exchange, she will continue her experiments and wants the alethiometer to reveal "Who is Lyra Belacqua?". Travelling north, she meets with Iofur, offering him a baptism and induction into the Magisterium in exchange for working with her.
5	5	"The Lost Boy"	Otto Bathurst	Jack Thorne	1 December 2019 (UK)	6.688 (UK)
5	5	"The Lost Boy"	Otto Bathurst	Jack Thorne	2 December 2019 (US)	0.467 (US)
Lyra and the Gyptians travel farther north with Scoresby and Iorek. The alethiometer signals Lyra to go to a nearby fishing village; Faa reluctantly allows her to go after Iorek agrees to take her. In an alternate world, Will Parry looks after his mentally ill mother, Elaine, while attending secondary school. They are stalked by Thomas and Boreal, who are seeking information about Will's father, John Parry. Elaine gives Will his father's letters, explaining his disappearance. Boreal determines that Parry has been travelling between worlds ever since his disappearance thirteen years earlier; evidence could be found in Will's home. Farder Coram meets with Serafina Pekkala to discuss the other worlds and a coming war. Lyra and Iorek arrive at the fishing village and find Billy Costa, who has been surgically separated from his daemon. They return Billy to his family, but he dies soon after. A Samoyed raiding party capture Lyra and bring her to Bolvangar, the Gobblers' base.
6	6	"The Daemon-Cages"	Euros Lyn	Jack Thorne	8 December 2019 (UK)	6.357 (UK)
6	6	"The Daemon-Cages"	Euros Lyn	Jack Thorne	9 December 2019 (US)	0.393 (US)
Lyra, posing as "Lizzie", finds Roger among the captive children at Bolvangar. She learns that the Gobblers are using an experimental procedure called intercision to surgically sever the children from their daemons. Mrs Coulter visits Bolvangar and discovers Lyra, saving her from undergoing an intercision. Mrs Coulter attempts to persuade Lyra to join her, claiming Dust is the source of sin that affects all adults. She attempts to get Lyra's alethiometer, but Lyra attacks her with the captured spy-fly. Lyra escapes and destroys the intercision machine and the base's generator. The children are rescued by the Gyptians, Iorek, Scoresby and Serafina Pekkala, who kill the scientists and mercenaries, although Mrs Coulter escapes. The Gyptians return south with the rescued children, while Lyra and Roger travel north with Scoresby and Iorek in the hot-air balloon to reach Lord Asriel on Svalbard. However, flying bat-like monsters called cliff-ghasts attack them, and Lyra falls from the airship. Meanwhile, Will Parry reads his father's letters as Thomas and another mercenary spy on him.
7	7	"The Fight to the Death"	Jamie Childs	Jack Thorne	15 December 2019 (UK)	6.073 (UK)
7	7	"The Fight to the Death"	Jamie Childs	Jack Thorne	16 December 2019 (US)	0.485 (US)
Lyra survives the fall, but is captured by an armoured bear and taken to Iofur Raknison's palace on Svalbard. She convinces Iofur that she is Iorek's artificial daemon, created by scientists at Bolvangar, and manipulates Iofur into fighting Iorek, with her as the prize. Iorek defeats and kills Iofur, reclaiming his rightful place as bear king. He reunites Lyra with Roger, and they travel to Asriel's laboratory. Meanwhile, Mrs Coulter, Father MacPhail and the Magisterium's soldiers head for Svalbard to find and kill Asriel. Elsewhere, Scoresby and Hester have crash-landed. Serafina arrives and tells them Lyra needs help. Lyra, Roger and Iorek reach Asriel's laboratory in the Svalbard mountains. Lyra and Asriel are reunited, though her arrival initially distresses Asriel. Meanwhile, Boreal crosses back to the alternate world and visits Elaine Parry, who resists sharing information about her husband. Will and Elaine return home after Boreal's mercenary has broken into the house. Will takes his mother to a neighbour's house and returns to retrieve his father's letters. When Thomas and the Pale-Face Man return, Will kills Thomas in self-defence, then flees.
8	8	"Betrayal"	Jamie Childs	Jack Thorne	22 December 2019 (UK)	5.865 (UK)
8	8	"Betrayal"	Jamie Childs	Jack Thorne	23 December 2019 (US)	0.502 (US)
At Svalbard, Lord Asriel informs Lyra about his Dust research and parallel worlds, explaining that the Magisterium fears Dust as the source of human sin. In the other world, Boreal has the Pale-Faced Man continue searching for Will, and reports him as missing to the police. Later, Asriel takes Roger to a point near the Aurora Borealis, intending to sever his daemon to create a bridge into another world. Learning Roger is in danger, Lyra, with King Iorek and the armoured bears, pursues him. Mrs Coulter and the Magisterium military arrive in airships and attack Iorek and his bears. Lyra is unable to save Roger, who is severed from his daemon and killed. His death causes an explosion and creates a bridge to another world. Mrs Coulter arrives and Asriel fails to persuade her to accompany him and challenge the Authority. Pan tells Lyra he does not believe that Dust is bad as was claimed. Lyra crosses the bridge. Meanwhile, a fugitive Will discovers a portal into another world.

=== Series 2 (2020) ===
No. overall	No. in series	Title	Directed by	Written by	Original release date	Viewers (millions)
9	1	"The City of Magpies"	Jamie Childs	Jack Thorne	8 November 2020 (UK)	5.660 (UK)
9	1	"The City of Magpies"	Jamie Childs	Jack Thorne	16 November 2020 (US)	0.227 (US)
Lyra steps through the portal and enters Cittàgazze, the "City in the Sky". She meets Will Parry, who arrived several days earlier. Will is startled by Lyra's daemon, Pan. He and Lyra learn both their worlds have an Oxford and other similarities. Only children are left in the city. They warn of ghostly spectres that absorb adult human souls. The witches prepare for war and task Lee Scoresby with finding Stanislaus Grumman, an explorer who reportedly died in the North. Aboard a submarine, Mrs Coulter tortures a captured witch who partially reveals a prophecy surrounding a child. Mrs Coulter claims to know that witches can travel between different worlds. Before the witch reveals the name tied to the prophecy, witch queen Ruta Skadi arrives and kills her and some submarine crew, then injures Cardinal Sturrock before escaping. Meanwhile, Lyra asks the alethiometer about Will. Later, Will has a vision of a knife and heads to the Tower of Angels at the city centre.
10	2	"The Cave"	Jamie Childs	Jack Thorne and Francesca Gardiner	15 November 2020 (UK)	5.027 (UK)
10	2	"The Cave"	Jamie Childs	Jack Thorne and Francesca Gardiner	23 November 2020 (US)	0.229 (US)
In Will's world, he visits his mother while Lyra heads to Oxford where she encounters Charles Latrom (Lord Boreal). The alethiometer guides Lyra to Mary Malone, an Oxford physicist researching Dark Matter (Dust). Lyra shows Mary the alethiometer, and Mary demonstrates her research that similarly allows computer communication with Dust. Cardinal Sturrock dies, making Father MacPhail a possible successor. Dr Lanselius, the witches' peace envoy, testifies that Ruta Skadi's attack was a lone act. He is falsely convicted of spying, heresy and treason. Will meets his paternal grandparents who want his father's letters. Will leaves as they are calling to report him to police. Mary connects Lyra to her computer. The particles form screen images that Lyra interprets. Lyra tells Will the alethiometer told her to help him. Mrs Coulter urges McPhail to take a bold action to increase his chances of being elected Cardinal. MacPhail then bombs the witches' territories, killing many. Thorold, Asriel's jailed assistant, tells Mrs Coulter that Asriel had intended to sacrifice Lyra to open up the other world, but instead used Roger. When MacPhail is chosen Cardinal, Mrs Coulter threatens blackmail to ensure his continued cooperation.
11	3	"Theft"	Leanne Welham	Jack Thorne and Sarah Quintrell	22 November 2020 (UK)	4.721 (UK)
11	3	"Theft"	Leanne Welham	Jack Thorne and Sarah Quintrell	30 November 2020 (US)	0.234 (US)
The witches vow retribution for their destroyed lands. A mysterious figure whispers for Lee Scoresby to "return". Boreal's henchman confronts Lyra in Mary Malone's office but she flees with Mary's help. Outside, Charles Latrom (Boreal) offers Lyra a lift. After exiting his car, she discovers the alethiometer missing from her backpack. Scoresby finds his balloon has inexplicably flown to Yenisei. Dr Haley, an astronomy scholar there, confirms Grumman is alive and declares him a heretic. Haley, a Magisterium agent, attempts to shoot Scoresby, who is arrested after killing Haley in self-defence. In Cittàgazze, Will sees someone inside the tower. Mrs Coulter arrives in Yenisei and discovers Scoresby jailed there. He conceals Lyra's whereabouts, but Mrs Coulter later frees him, knowing he will protect Lyra. Mary attempts to communicate with Dust. Serefina Pekkala's daemon, Kaisa, and Iorek discuss Lyra and the prophecy. Lord Boreal says he will return the alethiometer if Will and Lyra bring him a knife kept in the Tower of the Angels in Cittàgazze.
12	4	"Tower of the Angels"	Leanne Welham	Jack Thorne and Namsi Khan	29 November 2020 (UK)	4.757 (UK)
12	4	"Tower of the Angels"	Leanne Welham	Jack Thorne and Namsi Khan	7 December 2020 (US)	0.264 (US)
Years ago, the Subtle Knife was forged to travel between worlds, but overuse has created spectres. Scoresby finds Will's father, John Parry, now a shaman known as Jopari, who confirms he is Stanislaus Grumman. Jopari claims he "summoned" Scoresby and needs his help to find the Subtle Knife, named Æsahættr, and bring it to Lord Asriel. Mary rejects Boreal's offer to fund her and Oliver's research. Lyra and Will ascend the Tower of the Angels in Cittàgazze and encounter Giacomo Paradisi, the elderly knife bearer. A youth named Tullio has just attacked him and stolen the Subtle Knife. Will recovers the Knife, but his right-hand little finger and ring finger are partially severed during the struggle; Paradisi proclaims Will is now the knife bearer and shows how to cut portals between worlds. After Lyra and Will depart with the knife, Paradisi, no longer protected, fatally poisons himself to thwart the spectres. Spectres consume Tullio's soul. Scoresby agrees to help Jopari if Lyra is put under the Subtle Knife's protection. Mary communicates with Dust, which are angels, through her computer. Lord Boreal leads Mrs Coulter through Cittàgazze to the alternate Oxford to find Lyra. Serafina Pekkala and Ruta Skadi attack the Magisterium airships guarding the portal, then travel through to search for Lyra.
13	5	"The Scholar"	Leanne Welham	Francesca Gardiner	6 December 2020 (UK)	4.817 (UK)
13	5	"The Scholar"	Leanne Welham	Francesca Gardiner	14 December 2020 (US)	0.216 (US)
Cardinal MacPhail claims the witches' deadly airship attack is a sign that the Authority is punishing the Magisterium for lacking devotion. MacPhail then falsely accuses Father Graves, his rival for the cardinalate, of losing faith, and has him arrested. He instructs his alethiometrist, Fra Pavel, to learn Mrs Coulter's location and what she seeks. Mrs Coulter and Boreal arrive at Boreal's other Oxford house to await Lyra and Will's arrival. Mrs Coulter visits Mary Malone, introducing herself as Lyra's mother. Later, the Cave (Mary's research computer) instructs Mary to play the serpent, journey to another world, and save the girl and boy, before shutting itself down. Paola and Angelica blame Lyra and Will for the spectres consuming their brother, Tullio's, soul. Lyra arrives at Boreal's residence, distracting him, while Will cuts a window into his house to retrieve the alethiometer. Lyra encounters Mrs Coulter there, and Pan viciously attacks Coulter's daemon. Will, struggling with Boreal, grabs the alethiometer, then cuts a window back to Cittàgazze, escaping with Lyra. Boreal warns Mrs Coulter about the spectres when she wants to pursue Lyra. Mary steps through the window to Cittàgazze.
14	6	"Malice"	Jamie Childs	Jack Thorne and Lydia Adetunji	13 December 2020 (UK)	4.782 (UK)
14	6	"Malice"	Jamie Childs	Jack Thorne and Lydia Adetunji	21 December 2020 (US)	0.202 (US)
The witches see Angels flying overhead. Ruta Skadi believes they are joining Lord Asriel in a coming war. She follows, wanting to find Asriel to help him destroy the Magisterium. Fra Pavel informs Cardinal MacPhail that the alethiometer shows Mrs Coulter is searching for Lyra, who features in a prophecy. Paola, Angelica, and other children, wanting to avenge Tullio, attack Will and Lyra. Serafina arrives and saves them. The witches cast a healing spell on Will's wounded hand, but need more powerful medicinal plants growing in their lands. Spectres nearly devour one witch, but Will repels them with the Subtle Knife. Mary arrives in Cittàgazze, unknowingly protected by Angels. She encounters Paola and Angelica and promises to help find the adults that fled. Boreal and Mrs Coulter also enter Cittàgazze, searching for Lyra, Will and the Subtle Knife. They encounter spectres that Mrs Coulter can control by suppressing her humanity. She fatally poisons Boreal, as he hinders her ambitions. Lee and Parry, flying to Cittàgazze in Lee's balloon, are pursued by Magisterium airships. Parry uses his shaman powers to summon storms and a flock of birds that take down two airships. A third ship shoots Lee's balloon, forcing him to land.
15	7	"Æsahættr"	Jamie Childs	Jack Thorne	20 December 2020 (UK)	4.696 (UK)
15	7	"Æsahættr"	Jamie Childs	Jack Thorne	28 December 2020 (US)	0.347 (US)
As Lyra, Will and the witches continue travelling, Serafina sends two witches ahead as scouts. Elsewhere, Ruta Skadi overhears creatures called cliff-ghasts discussing a coming war that Lord Asriel cannot win without Æsahættr (the Subtle Knife). In Cittàgazze, Mrs Coulter captures and then tortures a witch to reveal Lyra's location and the prophecy about Lyra being the second Eve who brings a second Fall of Man. After finding the adults' campsite, Angelica and Paola leave Mary, who continues searching. Pursued by Magisterium soldiers, Lee urges Parry to flee while he fights them off. Lee is mortally wounded and summons Serafina with a cloud pine branch, but dies before she arrives. Parry is reunited with Will and urges him to fulfill his destiny as the knife bearer before they can return home. Parry is fatally shot, and, before dying, tells Will the Angels will guide him to Asriel. In a desolate world, the Angels pledge Lord Asriel their support in the coming war against the Authority. Mrs Coulter abducts Lyra. On a ship, Coulter vows to protect Lyra, who appears drugged and is confined inside a trunk. In a post-credits scene, Roger and Lyra call to one another in an unknown location.

=== Series 3 (2022) ===
No. overall	No. in series	Title	Directed by	Written by	Original release date	Viewers (millions)
16	1	"The Enchanted Sleeper"	Amit Gupta	Jack Thorne and Amelia Spencer	5 December 2022 (US)	0.154 (US)
16	1	"The Enchanted Sleeper"	Amit Gupta	Jack Thorne and Amelia Spencer	18 December 2022 (UK)	4.599 (UK)
After retreating to a remote island fortress, Mrs Coulter keeps Lyra in a drugged state. Ama, a deaf girl, provides them with supplies and medicines. While unconscious, Lyra is haunted by visions of her late friend, Roger. Meanwhile, Will encounters Balthamos and Baruch, two rebel Angels who assumed human form. They want Will to take the knife to Asriel. Will refuses to accompany them until he finds Lyra, so Balthamos reluctantly agrees to accompany him. In another world, Lord Asriel rescues Ogunwe, a rebel leader fighting against the "Temple", one of many arms of the Authority. Asriel recruits Ogunwe and his rebel army into his Republic of Heaven. Meanwhile, Lyra awakens, and she and Pan attempt to escape, but Coulter quickly recaptures her, due to Lyra's semi-drugged state. Balthamos and Will encounter Iorek Byrnison. They enlist his support after helping him free a fellow bear from human villagers.
17	2	"The Break"	Amit Gupta	Jack Thorne and Amelia Spencer	5 December 2022 (US)	0.154 (US)
17	2	"The Break"	Amit Gupta	Jack Thorne and Amelia Spencer	24 December 2022 (UK)	N/A (<3.046) (Note: Not reported in the weekly top 50 programmes.) (UK)
In Geneva, Cardinal MacPhail oversees a crackdown on dissidents. Fra Pavel Rasek consults his alethiometer and determines Mrs Coulter is hiding Lyra on an island in the "German Sea". MacPhail orders Father Gomez to find and kill Lyra. MacPhail regards Lyra as the new "Eve" that will bring sin to all worlds. Meanwhile, Alarbus, an Angel loyal to the Authority, murders Baruch. After both Angels crash into Lord Asriel's camp, Asriel imprisons and interrogates Alarbus, who reveals the Authority plans to destroy Dust to subjugate all worlds. Asriel tasks the Gallivespian spy, Commander Roke, and his agent, Salmakia, with spying on the Magisterium. In Ogunwe's world, Dr Malone encounters two young girls who stayed behind because their father remained with the Temple. Using the Subtle Knife, Will and a hidden Balthamos reach Coulter's island and, with Ama, rescue Lyra, though the Knife breaks because Mrs Coulter reminds Will of his mother. Will, Lyra, Balthamos, and Agent Salmakia escape Father Gomez's strike team and flee into another world. Soon after, Asriel arrives on Mrs Coulter's island in his Intention Craft.
18	3	"The Intention Craft"	Charles Martin	Jack Thorne	12 December 2022 (US)	0.132 (US)
18	3	"The Intention Craft"	Charles Martin	Jack Thorne	1 January 2023 (UK)	3.338 (UK)
Lyra's dream about Roger concludes, and she determines to travel to the Land of the Dead to rescue him. Will wishes to obey his father's final request to take the Subtle Knife to Lord Asriel, leading them to argue. Will and Lyra ask Iorek to mend the Knife. Iorek is reluctant but agrees, with the process requiring Will to dispel doubt over his actions. Will succeeds by picturing Lyra, and, with the Knife repaired, agrees to travel with Lyra to the Land of the Dead before seeking Asriel. Will cuts into the world from Lyra's dream, and they follow the figures they find there, ignoring Pan's wariness. Meanwhile, Asriel's forces agree to work with the captured Mrs Coulter. She is given freedom of the camp, though she falsely claims knowing nothing about Will's Knife. Asriel discovers her deception and shows her the captured angel Alarbus as proof of the Authority's corruption. Combining the severing technology with his device to travel between worlds, Asriel slices Alarbus into pieces and sends him to the Authority's regent, Metatron, as a warning. Mrs Coulter slips away and escapes in Asriel's flying Intention Craft. Elsewhere, Dr Malone continues her journey, while MacPhail employs Dr Cooper.
19	4	"Lyra and Her Death"	Charles Martin	Jack Thorne	12 December 2022 (US)	0.132 (US)
19	4	"Lyra and Her Death"	Charles Martin	Jack Thorne	8 January 2023 (UK)	3.308 (UK)
In the Land of the Dead, Lyra and Will are sent to a holding area where humans await death. There they learn that every person has a "Death", a figure that accompanies them through their life until they die. Will and Pan suggest turning back, but Lyra summons her Death, who agrees to take them where dead beings cross over. The boatman takes only Lyra and Will across, leaving Pan and Will's as yet unseen daemon behind. Mrs Coulter returns to the Magisterium. Claiming to still be loyal, Coulter tries convincing MacPhail that she can protect Lyra from temptation. Commander Roke, who stowed away on the Intention Craft, helps Coulter find Dr Cooper's laboratory where she is manufacturing a directional bomb. Roke attacks Dr Cooper and takes the lock of Lyra's hair that will guide the bomb to her. Mrs Coulter burns the hair, but fails to escape. MacPhail, who retained some of Lyra's hair, says he will sever Mrs Coulter from her daemon and use the released energy to trigger the bomb and assassinate Lyra. In a new world, Mary encounters a large quadruped mammal that brings her food and appears to communicate.
20	5	"No Way Out"	Weronika Tofilska (Note: Additional direction by Russell Dodgson)	Amelia Spencer	19 December 2022 (US)	0.162 (US)
20	5	"No Way Out"	Weronika Tofilska	Amelia Spencer	15 January 2023 (UK)	3.028 (UK)
Angels guide Mary to an uncharted world where she befriends the Mulefa, sentient quadruped mammals. She begins learning their language and experiences visions from the rebel Angels revealing she will act as the biblical Serpent. Lyra and Will reach the Land of the Dead where they find Roger and Lee Scoresby among the deceased, eternally trapped in Purgatory. Lyra tells everyone to remember the living world, to protect them from Harpies. Will attempts to slice a hole out of Purgatory, but the Subtle Knife does not work in the lower region; they set off for higher ground. Mary improvises a spyglass by coating amber pieces with seed pod oil, letting her see Dust escaping the Mulefa's world, slowly killing it. MacPhail and Dr Cooper prepare Mrs Coulter for detonating the bomb. However, Dr Cooper experiences guilt and halts the operation. MacPhail kills Dr Cooper and Commander Roke while Mrs Coulter's daemon frees her. MacPhail takes Mrs Coulter's place, but she disables the bomb before detonation. When Alarbus tells the Regent Metatron that Will is the new Knife Bearer, Metatron triggers the mechanism, killing MacPhail. The bomb detonates in the Land of the Dead.
21	6	"The Abyss"	Amit Gupta; Weronika Tofilska	Francesca Gardiner	19 December 2022 (US)	0.162 (US)
21	6	"The Abyss"	Amit Gupta; Weronika Tofilska	Francesca Gardiner	22 January 2023 (UK)	2.932 (UK)
Will and Lyra survive the bomb, but the explosion creates chasms across multiple worlds. Mrs Coulter escapes the Magisterium headquarters and returns to Lord Asriel, believing Lyra perished in the explosion. Witch queen Ruta Skadi, who is working with Asriel, dies when her daemon Sergi is pulled into a chasm. Asriel realises Angels can also be killed this way. Iorek Byrnison confronts Asriel about the consequences of his rebellion against the Authority, and tells Asriel that Lyra is alive in the Land of the Dead. Lyra and Will persuade the Harpies to let everyone leave Purgatory and enter Heaven in exchange for their life stories. Will is reunited with his father, John Parry, who urges him to find his daemon and return to his own world. Lyra and Will lead the others to Purgatory's highest point where Will opens a window, allowing the dead to leave. Lyra and Will bid farewell to Roger and Lee before the dead step through the window and dissolve, becoming one with the universe. Lyra and Will's actions incur Metatron's wrath. Asriel and Coulter prepare for their showdown with the Regent.
22	7	"The Clouded Mountain"	Amit Gupta; Russell Dodgson	Francesca Gardiner	26 December 2022 (US)	N/A (US)
22	7	"The Clouded Mountain"	Amit Gupta; Russell Dodgson	Francesca Gardiner	29 January 2023 (UK)	3.002 (UK)
Metatron and his Angel army converge above Asriel's rebel camp at the Clouded Mountain. Asriel leads the Republic of Heaven's forces against Metatron's legion. Spectres swarm the rebel camp, sucking out many combatants' souls; Mrs Coulter uses her mental ability to repel them. When Will and Lyra return to Lyra's world, Serafina Pekkala and other witches search for the two teens' daemons to reunite them. Ogunwe's soldiers rendezvous with Lyra and Will and escort them back to the camp. Metatron summons Mrs Coulter and Asriel to the Clouded Mountain, where he reveals himself as a former mortal, Enoch, who became divine. Mrs Coulter feigns loyalty to Metatron while Metatron defeats Asriel in combat. As Coulter's daemon activates the bomb beneath the Clouded Mountain, Asriel's daemon helps him and Coulter to pull Metatron into the abyss, killing them all. Coulter's daemon reaches out to Lyra before dissolving. While Asriel's forces celebrate their victory, Lyra and Will discover the Authority's prison that fell from the Clouded Mountain. Will cuts it open and the ancient Angel immediately dies. Having sent their daemons to the Mulefa's world, Will and Lyra follow them there.
23	8	"The Botanic Garden"	Harry Wootliff	Francesca Gardiner	26 December 2022 (US)	N/A (US)
23	8	"The Botanic Garden"	Harry Wootliff	Francesca Gardiner	5 February 2023 (UK)	N/A (<2.895) (UK)
Balthamos fatally crushes Gomez's insect daemon in the Mulefa world, but its venom kills him. The Mulefa lead Will and Lyra to Mary, who explains about Dust having a shared consciousness. Mary reveals she left a convent to experience life beyond religion. When Will and Lyra realise they are in love, Dust rains downward, restoring all worlds. Serafina Pekkala arrives and urges Pan and Will's daemon to find their humans. The angel Xaphania tells Mary her role as the Serpent is complete, and all windows between worlds except for the exit from the Land of the Dead must be closed. Lyra and Will sadly agree they must separate, promising to reunite in the afterlife. Lyra discovers the alethiometer no longer works for her. The group return to Lyra's world. Before Mary departs for her Oxford, Serafina helps her see her own daemon. Lyra and Will say goodbye before Will permanently closes the window between them. He breaks the Subtle Knife so Angels can seal the openings that previous Knife Bearers never closed. Lyra returns to Jordan College while Will reunites with his mother. Each midsummer's day, as promised, Lyra and Will sit in their respective worlds' Oxford Botanic Garden to remember each other.

== Production ==
=== Development ===
The three His Dark Materials novels, written by Philip Pullman from 1995 to 2000, achieved critical and commercial success and were adapted into a 2007 feature film, The Golden Compass. The film was criticised by religious organisations, who objected to the story's anti-religious elements, as well as by fans of the trilogy who disliked the dilution of these elements. Despite earning $372 million worldwide, the film underperformed at the box office in North America, making any sequels unlikely.

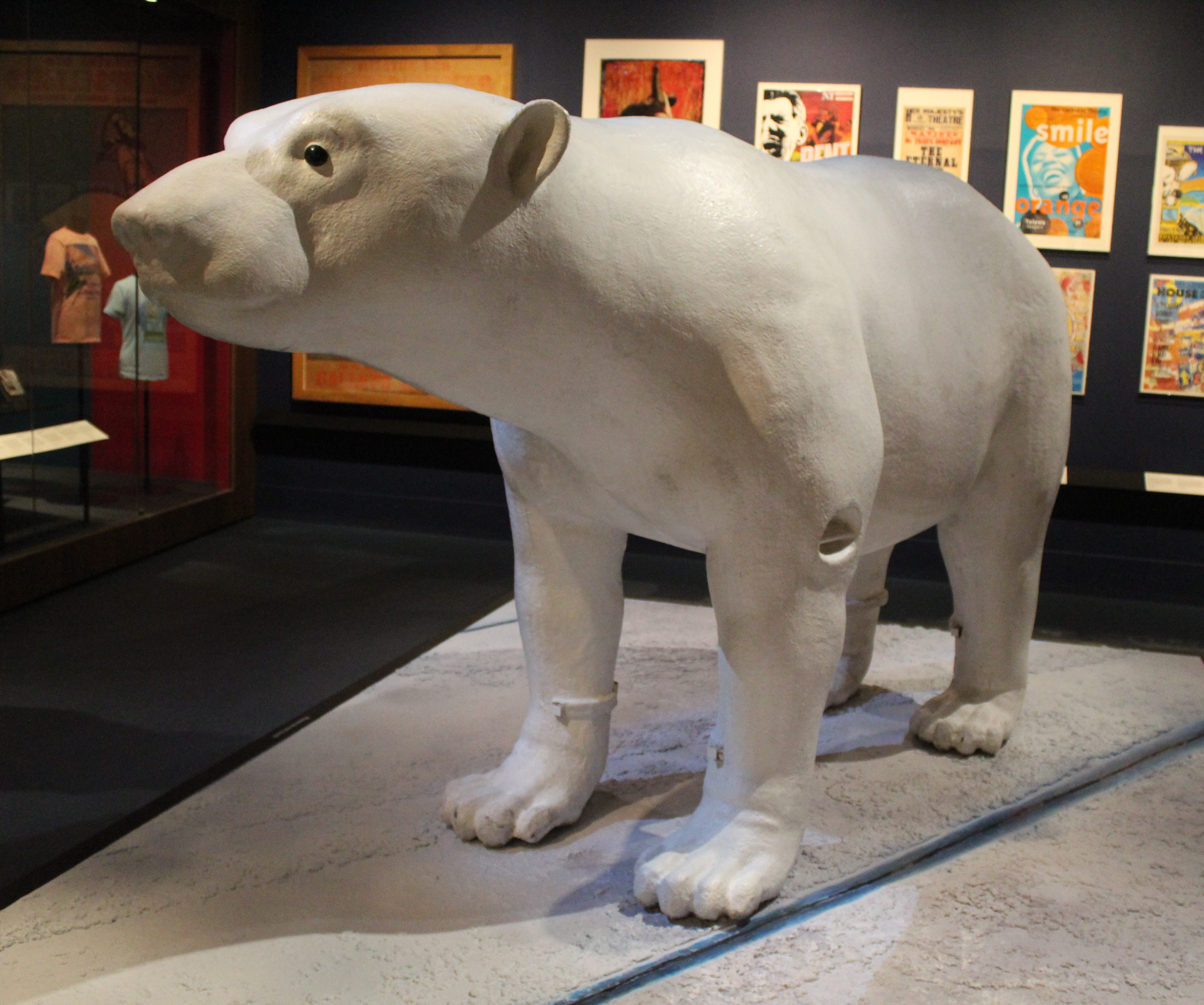
Reference figure of Iorek Byrnison, Victoria and Albert Museum, London

After several years, the rights reverted to Pullman. In November 2015, BBC One announced that it had commissioned a television adaptation of the trilogy, to be produced by Bad Wolf and New Line Cinema. The eight-part adaptation had a planned premiere date in 2017. In April 2017 writer Jack Thorne told Radio Times that the series was still in pre-production. He said, "It's at an exciting point where we're just throwing things at the page and trying to work out what works and what doesn't", and that he wanted to ensure that they were being loyal to the books. Director Otto Bathurst explained that some elements of the book and film had been changed to give the series a more modern feel, compared to the original's Victoriana fantasy.

On 12 September 2018, HBO was announced as the co-producer and international distributor of the series. On 10 October 2018, Miranda reported that he had wrapped up filming for his role. On 14 December 2018, it was announced that filming for the first series was complete.

Before the series premiered, it was renewed for a second series of eight episodes, primarily adapting the second book in the trilogy, The Subtle Knife. Filming of the second series began before the premiere of the first, which was considered "a necessary move considering the age of the show's young star". While filming for series 2 was mostly completed before the COVID-19 pandemic, a standalone episode focusing on Lord Asriel was left unfinished. As a consequence the series ultimately only consisted of seven episodes. Although McAvoy completed a small amount of filming before production was shut down, his appearance in the second series's final episode was filmed during the pandemic, repurposed from material written for the abandoned episode.

By November 2020, work had begun on six of eight scripts for a third series adapting The Amber Spyglass. The commission was confirmed in December 2020, for a series of eight episodes, and production began in early 2021. Filming for the third series took place between 24 May and 31 October 2021.

=== Casting ===
Promotional image showing lead characters and locations

On 8 March 2018, it was announced that Dafne Keen had signed on to star in the series to play Lyra with director Tom Hooper signed on to direct. Lin-Manuel Miranda would star as Lee Scoresby. On 8 June 2018, it was reported that James McAvoy, Clarke Peters, and Ruth Wilson had joined the cast.

On 27 July 2018, the BBC and Bad Wolf revealed the cast and crew for the series.

On 1 July 2020, it was revealed that Bella Ramsey had been cast in the role of Angelica in series 2. Casting Director Kahleen Crawford said, "Ella and Bella were so strong in their performances. If I’m remembering correctly, it was essentially decided that their parts should be made bigger – and there would be more for them to do onscreen."

Additional casting for the third series was announced on 22 June 2021, including Adewale Akinnuoye-Agbaje as Commander Ogunwe, Jamie Ward as Father Gomez, Kobna Holdbrook-Smith as Balthamos, Simon Harrison as Baruch, and Amber Fitzgerald-Woolfe as Ama. Chipo Chung was also reported as playing the angel Xaphania, who was voiced by Sophie Okonedo in series 2.

On 20 September 2021, it was announced that Sian Clifford and Jonathan Aris had been cast in series 3.

=== Music ===
On 14 August 2019, it was announced that Lorne Balfe was hired to score the series. Speaking about the job, Balfe stated that he "wanted to write a musical letter to the creators of the show", also mentioning that the series was a "mammoth task" and one of his biggest projects yet. Scoring primarily took place in St David's Hall in Cardiff, Wales with the BBC National Orchestra of Wales, while the ethnic Bulgarian choir was recorded in Bulgaria with additional remote sessions taking place at the Synchron Scoring Stage in Vienna, Austria with the Synchron Stage Orchestra. Also featured on the score are cellist Tina Guo, Red Hot Chili Peppers drummer Chad Smith, classical French horn player Sarah Willis, violinist Lindsey Stirling, and recordist Richard Harvey. Two soundtrack albums were released: a musical anthology with thematic pieces and an album containing all the cues used in the series. Silva Screen Records released the albums digitally on 3 November 2019 and 20 December 2019, respectively.

Lorne Balfe's His Dark Materials score was nominated for two awards: for Best Original Score for a Television Series at the 2020 International Film Music Critics Association (IFMCA) awards and for Music – Original Title at the 2020 Royal Television Society awards.

== Release ==
On 24 July 2019, it was announced that the series would premiere in the fourth quarter of 2019 in the UK and the US. On 12 September 2019, sources revealed that the series was set to premiere on 3 November 2019 on BBC One and the following night on HBO. In New Zealand, the series is broadcast by Sky TV and is available on streaming service Neon. The series began on 5 November 2019. In Australia, the series is distributed by the cable and satellite television company Foxtel through their HBO output deal.

The second series premiered on 8 November 2020 in the UK, and on 16 November 2020 in the US. The third series premiered on HBO on 5 December 2022, and premiered in the UK on 18 December 2022, with the series being released in full on BBC iPlayer, and airing weekly on BBC One.

=== Home media ===
The three series of the programme were gradually released on Blu-ray and DVD, between 2020 and 2023, after each season ended.

== Reception ==
=== Critical response ===
==== Series 1 ====
Series one received mostly positive reviews from critics. On Rotten Tomatoes, the first series has an approval rating of 77% based on reviews from 114 critics, with an average rating of 5.75/10. The website's critical consensus reads: "The daemon is in the details and while His Dark Materials' visual splendor and exceptional performances deftly capture the essence of Philip Pullman's seminal novels, it could use a little more magic." On Metacritic, the series has a score of 69 out of 100 based on reviews from 22 critics, indicating "generally favorable reviews".

Dan Fienberg of The Hollywood Reporter wrote that "this effort nails much of what makes the books pop, and both the special effects and a star-studded cast led by Dafne Keen and Ruth Wilson are in fine form." However, he followed that by saying: "What never fully worked for me in the four episodes... sent to critics is the necessary feeling of narrative and thematic momentum. It's vastly better than the movie, but neither fun nor smart enough to quite succeed." Caroline Framke of Variety wrote: "Despite the rich complexities of the novel's world of daemons, power-hungry players and warring faiths, HBO's His Dark Materials feels like it could have been plucked from most any other fantasy epic out there." Beth Elderkin of Gizmodo was critical of the show's inability to capture the connection between humans and daemons.

Ben Lawrence of The Telegraph gave the first episode 4 out of 5 stars, calling it "a fine piece of drama, capturing the strangeness and childlike wonder of the books, but also their rigour and bite. This is intelligent populism writ large." Huw Fullerton of the Radio Times gave the first episode a positive review: "While there is a slight element of table-setting in the series' first hour the appeal of the actors and setting are beguiling enough to pull you through all the exposition and explanation." Fullerton praised Wilson for her performance, saying she "nearly walks away with the whole series". David Levesley of British GQ wrote that His Dark Materials as a whole illustrates the fundamental problem with remaking adaptations: "the execution doesn't feel far enough removed from the previous version to actually make for a significantly better product".

==== Series 2 ====
Series two received generally positive reviews from critics. On Rotten Tomatoes, the second series has an approval rating of 85% based on reviews from 33 critics, with an average rating of 6.87/10. The website's critical consensus reads: "His Dark Materials' chilly emotional core and imposing complexity is unlikely to win over the unconverted, but its sophomore season rewards the faithful with impeccable production values and cerebral thrills." On Metacritic, series 2 has a score of 71 out of 100 based on reviews from 4 critics, indicating "generally favorable reviews".

Stuart Jeffries of The Guardian praised the series, and in particular the villainous Mrs Coulter, calling Pullman's creation a compelling monster, and that writer Jack Thorne clearly "revels in punching up Coulter as a combination of Iago and Lady Macbeth with a hint, at her most pantomimic, of Cruella de Vil" and "you never know what she might do next". Jeffries was critical of the musical score, comparing it to "The Boy Who Cried Wolf", leaving audiences in doubt if the next dramatic moment was quite as significant as the music was suggesting, and undermining the two good lead actors who convey the necessary dramatic tension in their performances. Ed Cumming of The Independent wrote: "His Dark Materials looks great, it's robustly made, and there are great actors everywhere, occupying well-built universes. But it doesn't inspire as much wonder as it ought to." Ed Power of The Irish Times was critical of the series. Despite the strong cast, he called it "slow-moving and inhospitable towards newcomers" and plodding in its execution. Power blamed Pullman's source material: "frankly the whole thing is a bit of a drag. It's never fun being preached to, not even by an atheist." He concludes "His Dark Materials has a lot going for it. But it desperately lacks a sense of fun and, crucial for fantasy, the promise of escapism."

==== Series 3 ====
Series three received generally positive reviews from critics. On Rotten Tomatoes, the final series has an approval rating of 90% based on reviews from 21 critics, with an average rating of 7.30/10. The website's critical consensus reads: "In perhaps its most stirring season, the final installment of His Dark Materials rewards its viewers with a heart-wrenching conclusion befitting this faithful adaptation." Stuart Jeffries of The Guardian gave it four out of five stars, praising the performances and visual effects.

=== Accolades ===
Year	Award	Category	Nominee(s)	Result	Ref.
2020	Annie Awards	Outstanding Achievement for Character Animation in an Animated Television/Broadcast Production	Aulo Licinio	Won	
2020	British Academy Television Craft Awards	Best Costume Design	Caroline McCall	Nominated	
2020	British Academy Television Craft Awards	Best Photography & Lighting: Fiction	Suzie Lavelle	Nominated	
2020	British Academy Television Craft Awards	Best Sound: Fiction	Dillon Bennett, Jon Thomas, Gareth Bull and James Ridgeway	Nominated	
2020	British Academy Television Craft Awards	Best Special, Visual & Graphic Effects	Framestore, Painting Practice, Real SFX and Russel Dodgson	Won	
2020	British Academy Television Craft Awards	Best Titles & Graphic Identity	Elastic, Painting Practice	Won	
2020	Satellite Awards	Best Television Series – Genre	His Dark Materials	Nominated	
2020	Visual Effects Society Awards	Outstanding Visual Effects in a Photoreal Episode	Russell Dodgson, James Whitlam, Shawn Hillier and Robert Harrington	Nominated	
2020	Royal Television Society Craft & Design Awards	Design – Titles	Titles Team	Won	
2020	Royal Television Society Craft & Design Awards	Effects	Framestore, Russell Dodgson, Dan May, Danny Hargreaves	Won	
2020	Royal Television Society Craft & Design Awards	Music – Original Title	Lorne Balfe	Nominated	
2020	Royal Television Society Craft & Design Awards	Production Design – Drama	Joel Collins	Won	
2021	British Academy Television Craft Awards	Best Production Design	Joel Collins	Nominated	
2021	British Academy Television Craft Awards	Best Sound: Fiction	Jon Thomas, Gareth Bull, James Ridgway, Dillon Bennett, Eilam Hoffman	Won	
2021	British Academy Television Craft Awards	Best Special, Visual & Graphic Effects	Russell Dodgson, James Whitlam, Jean-Clement Soret, Robert Harrington, Dan May, Brian Fisher	Won	
2021	Satellite Awards	Best Television Series – Genre	His Dark Materials	Nominated	
2021	Saturn Awards	Best Television Presentation (under 10 episodes)	His Dark Materials	Nominated	
2021	Royal Television Society Craft & Design Awards	Costume Design – Drama	Caroline McGall	Nominated	
2021	Royal Television Society Craft & Design Awards	Effects	Effects Team	Nominated	
2021	Royal Television Society Craft & Design Awards	Make Up Design – Drama	Jacqueline Fowler	Nominated	
2021	Royal Television Society Craft & Design Awards	Production Design – Drama	Joel Collins	Nominated	
