= Moosa Mostafa =

British Actor

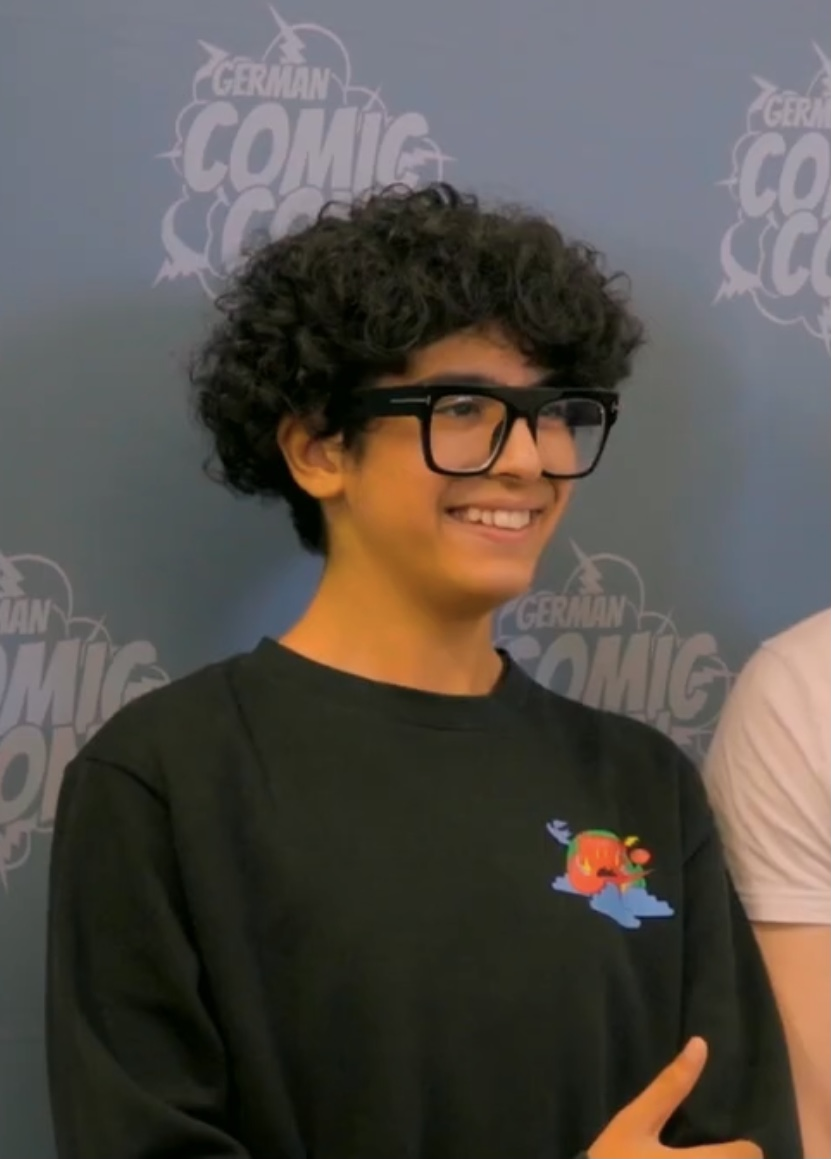
- Mostafa at the 2023 German Comic Con
- Born: 23 February 2008 (age 18); Leamington Spa, England
- Alma mater: Guildhall School of Music and Drama
- Occupation: Actor
- Years active: 2015–present

Moosa Mostafa (born 22 February 2008) is an English actor. On television, he is known for his roles in the Netflix series Wednesday (2022–now) and The Last Bus (2023).

== Early life ==
Mostafa was born in Leamington Spa, Warwickshire and is of Arab descent. Mostafa attended Warwick School and completed his GCSEs exams during the production of Wednesday.

== Career ==
In 2022, Mostafa began starring as Eugene Ottinger in the Netflix series Wednesday.

In 2023, he played as Nas in The last Bus, also on Netflix. and appeared in Nativity Rocks!, in 2018 as a student of St Bernadette's class.

== Filmography ==
Project name	Project date	Project type
The last Bus	2023	Series (1 season)
Wednesday	2022-now	Series (2 seasons as of 2026)
Nativity rocks!	2018	Movie
