= Jamie Ward (actor) =

Australian actor

- Born: Australia
- Education: Western Australian Academy of Performing Arts
- Occupation: Actor

Jamie Ward is an Australian actor and former singer.

== Early life ==
Ward was raised in Yokine, a suburb of Perth in Western Australia. He later graduated from the Western Australian Academy of Performing Arts. He relocated to London in 2012.

== Career ==
=== Music ===
Ward was previously in the four-piece alt-pop band, Balcony, which started in South London. In 2020, the band supported Lewis Capaldi on tour, as well as the Australian singer, Tones and I.

=== Theatre ===
He had roles in his home country in the Sydney Theatre Company's Spring Awakening as Hanschen, and Gordon Frost's adaptation of Dr Zhivago as Young Yurii Zhivago. He also appeared with the Australian Opera Company. He made his West End theatre debut in London as Marius in Les Miserables in 2013.

=== Film and television ===
He had early roles in British television series The Durrells and starred in children's television show Ride He appeared in zombie thriller The Rezort and filmed American drama Tyrant. He appeared in the film adaptation of the Dalia Sofer novel Septembers of Shiraz, in which he appears alongside Salma Hayek and Adrien Brody.

He played Father Gomez in the final season of the television adaptation of His Dark Materials in 2022. In February 2023, he was cast as Romeo in the musical modern reimagining of the Shakespeare play Juliet & Romeo.

He portrays Lorenzo in Stan original television series Invisible Boys. He was cast as Jesus Christ in Pinnacle Peak Pictures' film The Last Supper.

He is set to appear as Pell in the third season of Netflix's adaptation of One Piece.

== Partial filmography ==
Key
†	Denotes works that have not yet been released

Feature roles
Year	Title	Role	Notes
2015	The Rezort	Mike	
2015	Septembers of Shiraz	Parviz Amin	
2016	The Durrells	Angel	3 episodes
2016–2017	Ride	Santiago	3 episodes
2016	Tyrant	Nabil	5 episodes
2018	Monster Party	Jeremy	
2019	Cliffs of Freedom	Young Demetri	
2022	His Dark Materials	Father Gomez	6 episodes
2024	Martin Scorsese Presents: The Saints	Marcus	Episode: "Sebastian"
2025	Invisible Boys	Lorenzo Calogero	5 episodes
2025	The Last Supper	Jesus Christ	
2025	Juliet & Romeo	Romeo	
2026	Zero A. D.: The Birth of Christ †	Joseph	Post-production
2027	One Piece †	Pell	Post-production

2026 The Nameless Ballad

Video game roles
Year	Title	Role	Notes
2025	The Run	Cliff	
