= The Dark End of the Street (2020 film) =

- Directed by: Kevin Tran
- Written by: Kevin Tran
- Starring: Brooke Bloom; Scott Friend; Jim Parrack; Lindsay Burdge; Michael Cyril Creighton; Jennifer Kim; Daniel K. Isaac; Anthony Chisholm; Rod Luzzi
- Distributed by: Gravitas Ventures
- Release date: August 11, 2020
- Running time: 69 minutes
- Country: United States
- Language: English

The Dark End of the Street is a 2020 American drama film written and directed by Kevin Tran and starring Brooke Bloom, Scott Friend, Jim Parrack, Lindsay Burdge, Michael Cyril Creighton, Jennifer Kim, Daniel K. Isaac, Anthony Chisholm and Rod Luzzi.

== Cast ==
- Scott Friend as Jim
- Lindsay Burdge as Patty
- Brooke Bloom as Marney
- Jim Parrack as Richard
- Michael Cyril Creighton as Isaac
- Jennifer Kim as Sue
- Daniel K. Isaac as Keith
- Anthony Chisholm as Ian
- Rod Luzzi as Frank

== Release ==
The film was released on VOD on August 11, 2020.

== Reception ==
The film has a 100% rating on Rotten Tomatoes based on five reviews.

Nick Allen of RogerEbert.com awarded the film three stars and wrote, "This is not a movie about big moments, and the sooner you roll with its atmosphere, the more Tran's assured directorial debut has to reward you."

Anthony Gramuglia of Comic Book Resources gave the film a positive review and wrote, "And while the human drama is accompanied by a distinct lack of tension, there is something to be said for the film emphasizing how we tend to ignore evil lurking right under our noses, dismissing it before turning our attention to other problems."
