= Daniel Frogson =

British actor (born 2002)

- Born: Daniel Jake Frogson; 20 August 2002 (age 23); Nottingham, England
- Occupation: Actor
- Years active: 2018–2023
- Notable work: His Dark Materials
- Criminal charges: Making indecent images of children
- Criminal penalty: 8 months in prison, suspended for 24 months; 10 years on sex offenders' register

Daniel Jake Frogson (born 20 August 2002) is a British actor and convicted sex offender. He is best known for his role as Tony Costa in His Dark Materials and as Joe in CBBC mini-series Joe All Alone, and was nominated for a BAFTA Children's Award for the latter.

== Life and career ==
Daniel Frogson was born on 20 August 2002 in Nottingham, England.

He is known for His Dark Materials (2019), The Devil Outside (2018), The Last Bus (2022) and The Unlikely Pilgrimage of Harold Fry (2023).

In 2018, he was nominated for a BAFTA Children's Award for his role in Joe All Alone.

== 2024 arrest ==
In 2024, Frogson was sentenced for 845 indecent images of children, consisting of 165 category A images, 88 category B images, and 592 category C images. He was sentenced to an eight-month jail sentence, which was suspended for 24 months, and put on the sex offenders' register.

== Awards and nominations ==
Year	Ceremony	Category	Nominated work	Result	Ref.
2018	BAFTA Children's Awards	Young performer	Joe All Alone	Nominated	
