= Daniel K. Isaac =

American actor

- Born: December 5, 1988 (age 37); Fullerton, California, U.S.
- Occupations: Actor; writer

Daniel K. Isaac is an American actor and writer. He is known for his recurring role as Ben Kim in Showtime's Billions. Isaac is also known for creating the hashtag #AccordingToMyMother, which he uses to share comedic conversations between him and his mother.

== Early life and education ==
Isaac's parents are immigrants from Korea. His mother raised him in California as a single parent, and he grew up bilingual. Isaac is an only child. He received his bachelor's degree in theater from the University of California, San Diego.

== Career ==
In 2015, Isaac created the hashtag #AccordingToMyMother to share comedic conversations with his mother. He then started a Kickstarter campaign to finance a short film loosely based on their relationship. Isaac produced and starred in what became a television pilot, According to My Mother, with Cathy Yan and Devin Landin. It premiered at the New York Television Festival in October 2016 and won the award for Best Drama. Isaac was named Best Actor in a Drama for his performance.

Isaac has appeared in the role of Ben Kim in Billions since its premiere in 2016. The role was initially written to be to a three-episode part, but the writers ended up making the character a series regular the first two seasons. Isaac also stars as a bike courier with a foot fetish in the BDSM-focused web series Mercy Mistress, produced by Margaret Cho.

He portrayed William Inge in an off-Broadway production of Philip Dawkins' The Gentleman Caller in May 2018.

Isaac appeared in a recurring role as Jeremy Delongpre in the first season of the 2019 Comedy Central series The Other Two. He also played the role of "Sandwich Artist" in the May 22, 2022 Episode (#251) of the HBO series Last Week Tonight with John Oliver.

In 2022, Isaac made his play-writing debut with Once Upon a (Korean) Time, which was produced by the Ma-Yi Theatre Company and performed at the historic La MaMa Experimental Theatre Club in New York City. The production was directed by Ralph Peña. Also in 2022, it was announced that Isaac would star in the comedy film Plan B, alongside Jon Heder, Tom Berenger, and Shannon Elizabeth.

== Personal life ==
Isaac is gay. He voluntarily participated in gay conversion therapy from the age of 13 to 16. His mother, a devout Christian, disowned him for his sexuality when he was a freshman in college. Isaac later embraced his sexuality.

== Credits ==
=== Film ===
Year	Title	Role	Notes
2011	Too Big To Fail	Translator	TV movie
2016	Money Monster	Male Raver	
2016	Urban Teach Now	Vincent	TV movie
2016	Eugenia and John	Dan Eisenberg	
2016	Drew	Noah	TV movie
2017	Maggie Black	Delivery Guy	
2020	The Dark End of the Street	Keith	
2021	The Drummer	Mike	
2025	Outerlands	Emile	
TBA	Rest and Relaxation	Daniel	Post-production

=== Television ===
Year	Title	Role	Notes
2011	Kelsey	Tyrone	
2014	Believe	Lab Tech	Episode: Pilot
2014	Person of Interest	Virgil	2 episodes
2014–15	Mr. Right	Justin	
2015	The Following	Paramedic	Episode: Dead or Alive
2015	Dog Park	Jacob Hart	
2016	The Jim Gaffigan Show	Foshay	Episode: No Good Deed: Part 3
2016	Search Party	Barista	Episode: The Return of the Forgotten Phantom
2016–23	Billions	Ben Kim	55 episodes
2017	Quiet Tiny Asian	Boyfriend	
2017	Crashing	Korean Man	Episode: Barking
2017	Don't Shoot the Messenger	Michael	Episode: Episode #1.6
2018	Ollie & Molly Can't Get Arrested	Ryan	2 episodes
2018	Puffy	Gordon	Mini series
2018–19	Mercy Mistress	Ken	9 episodes
2019	The Other Two	Jeremy Delongpre	2 episodes
2019	Indoor Boys	Walker	Web series, 3 episodes
2019	The Deuce	Dr. Lee	Episode: Episode #3.5
2024	Elsbeth	Lieutenant Steve Connor	7 episodes

=== Theater ===
Year	Title	Role	Venue	Level of Production
2009	Miss Electricity	Freddy	La Jolla Playhouse	Regional
2013	Shalom Shanghai	Suzuki	Shanghai International Arts Festival	International
2015	Underland	Taka	59E59 Theaters	Off-Broadway
2016	Sagittarius Ponderosa	Owen	3LD Art and Technology Center	
2017	The Ballad of Little Jo	Tin Man Wong	Two River Theater	Regional
2018	The Chinese Lady	Atung	Barrington Stage Company	Regional
2018	The Gentleman Caller	William Inge	Abingdon Theatre	
2018	The Chinese Lady	Atung	Beckett Theater	Off-Broadway
2022	Once Upon a (Korean) Time	Playwright	La MaMa Experimental Theatre Club	Off-Broadway
2022	You Will Get Sick	#1	Laura Pels Theatre	Off-Broadway
2023	Every Brilliant Thing	Narrator	Geffen Playhouse	
