= The Last Bus (TV series) =

British Netflix series (2022–)

- Genre: Science fiction; Adventure
- Created by: Paul Neafcy
- Developed by: Jesse Cleverly; Sarah Mattingley; Paul Neafcy
- Starring: Moosa Mostafa; Phoebe De Silva; Daniel Frogson; Lauryn Ajufo; Marlie Morelle; Nathanael Saleh; Carys John; Robert Sheehan
- Music by: Nathan Micay
- Country of origin: United Kingdom
- Original language: English
- No. of series: 1
- No. of episodes: 10

Production
- Producer: Andy Mosse
- Production location: England
- Production company: Wildseed Studios

Original release
- Network: Netflix
- Release: 1 April 2022

The Last Bus is a British science fiction adventure television series created by Paul Neafcy for Netflix. The series consists of ten episodes and premiered on Netflix on 1 April 2022. The show stars Moosa Mostafa, Phoebe De Silva, Daniel Frogson, Lauryn Ajufo, Marlie Morrelle, Nathanael Saleh and Carys John with guest appearances by Tom Basden, Lara McDonnell and Robert Sheehan. The show follows a group of children who are the last people on Earth when a famous scientist creates orbs that vaporise everybody on the planet. It received generally positive reviews, with praise for its style, story, casting, musical score, screenplay and emotional weight, but were divided with the acting, characters, and comparisons to Stranger Things.

== Plot ==
A group of mismatched school kids band together to face a fearsome new machine intelligence.

== Cast ==
- Moosa Mostafa as Nasir "Nas" Roman, a gifted 12 year-old boy who is obsessed with Dalton Monkhouse.
- Phoebe De Silva as Sophie Roman, Nas's older sister who always tries to take care of him.
- Daniel Frogson as Thomas "Tom" Little, a lonely boy whose mother hates him and father died when he was 10.
- Lauryn Ajufo as Misha Morris, a rebellious girl who is best friends with Sophie.
- Marlie Morrelle as Chelsea, a perfect girl who always tries to get everyone to follow the rules.
- Nathanael Saleh as Joshua "Josh" Collins, a goofy boy who mostly cares about his sick mother.
- Carys John as Bethan Conner, a song-loving 12 year-old girl who is best friends with Josh.
- Curtis Kantsa as Danny Adeyemi, a bully who is friends with Tom.
- Robert Sheehan as Dalton Monkhouse, a genius scientist who has his new invention, Genie Orbs, put everyone on the planet in stasis.
- Tom Basden as Mr. Short, a teacher at Braelawn Academy.
- Lara McDonnell as Lucy Monkhouse, Dalton's 16 year-old daughter whom he abandoned.

== Episodes ==
No.	Title	Directed by	Written by	Original release date
1	"Episode 1"	Lawrence Gough	Paul Neafcy	April 1, 2022
A class from Braelawn Academy take a bus trip to an unveiling of famous scientist Dalton Monkhouse's latest creation at The Green Arena. At the dome, Nasir Roman runs through a door and his older sister Sophie chases after him whilst her friend Misha Morris liberates a hedgehog they found on the road earlier. At the convention, Monkhouse reveals his creation: Genie Orb, designed to clean up the environment and bring about world peace. Meanwhile Sophie finds Nas face-to-face with a rogue orb. The orbs then suddenly vaporise nearly everyone at the convention.
2	"Episode 2"	Lawrence Gough	Paul Neafcy	April 1, 2022
Nas and Sophie make it back to the convention just in time to see everyone get vaporised by the Genie Orbs. Nas finds himself trying to escape with bully Danny Adeyemi who abandons him, comedic best friends Joshua Collins and Bethan Conner along with perfect Chelsea escape through the vents and get covered in plant fertiliser before finally making it to the bus. Sophie, Misha and Danny's friend Thomas Little run into Danny and find out he ditched Nas. Danny offers Tom to come with him but he declines and Danny escapes. The three make it back to the bus and the driver is vaporised. The orb then goes away when Nas gains a Kin Chip, the orbs network transponder, which can let the holder be passed off as one of them. Misha, driving the bus, escapes the orbs and drives the group back home to Braelawn.
3	"Episode 3"	Lawrence Gough	Katie Baxendale	April 1, 2022
The kids get home to find their houses empty and parents missing. On most of their electronic devices, a message from Monkhouse for the people that weren't attending the convention. The message says to go to their “designated collection point”: Braelawn Academy Sports Hall. In the gymnasium, everyone has already been evacuated. Josh then finds his mother's broken pulse monitor, which Nas later fixes proving the orbs didn't vaporise everyone. As night falls, Tom makes an SOS sign on the school roof and listens to a voicemail sent by his father.
4	"Episode 4"	Lawrence Gough	Katie Baxendale	April 1, 2022
The rogue orb that Nas encountered at The Green Arena has followed the kids to the school. The group wake up to eat breakfast and Tom plays his father's voicemail over the speakers telling everyone to come to the headmaster's office. Tom explains that the voicemail was his father calling him from Wallgate Barracks where he was stationed. Thinking that's where everyone else is, the group start to pack up and decorate the bus. Nas finds the orb and tries to hunt it so he can study it. When he finally catches it, Tom beats it down with a bat. The Kin Chip is fried in the process and orbs surround the school. A chase ensues on the sports field and the kids make it to the bus and drive off.
5	"Episode 5"	Drew Casson	Victoria Asare-Archer	April 1, 2022
Driving out of Braelawn, the orbs chase the bus whilst losing fuel. Although managing to evade them, Josh's mother's pulse monitor falls out of the bus. Stopping at a theme park, Josh runs back to find the monitor broken. The orb that fell out the bus attracts other objects including the monitor turning into a giant robot. It attempts to vaporise Josh but Nas, who has fixed the Kin Chip, disarms the orb. Bethan, now traumatised, smashes up the orb. Looking for fuel, the group decide to search the theme park not knowing the orb, now hunting Bethan, has regenerated. Looking to turn the place on, Misha, Chelsea, Bethan and Josh look for the power generators whilst Sophie and Tom hear the voice of a child in a soft play where they are both kidnapped by a hooded assailant.
6	"Episode 6"	Nour Wazzi	Joe Markham and Joe Parham	April 1, 2022
The kidnapper is revealed to be the smashed up orb and traps Sophie and Tom in candy floss. Meanwhile Nas attempts to fix the orb from school, and Chelsea (who takes a rule-breaking course from Misha), Josh, Bethan and Misha see the orb, thinking it's Tom, and chase after it. Sophie and Tom manage to eat their way out of the candy floss where Tom reveals his mother hates him and Sophie reveals her middle name to be Tango. Nas fixes the orb but falls down the stairs and breaks his glasses. Chelsea, Misha, Bethan and Josh are chased by the orb and name it Evil Steve (Stevil for short). Nas wakes up and the orb fixes his glasses causing him to realise it's not a threat. At the bumper cars, Chelsea, who has followed Misha's advice, bumps into Stevil and electrocutes him. Nas arrives with the orb but due to the rest of the group still thinking it's a threat, he is carried by the orb out of the park and through a holiday park.
7	"Episode 7"	Nour Wazzi	Katie Baxendale	April 1, 2022
Nas finds the orb in a greenhouse where he argues with it and it shuts down. Tom gives Sophie and Bethan a time limit to find Nas whilst Misha, Chelsea and Josh try to buy more time. Sophie and Bethan find Nas in the greenhouse looking down on the orb and he runs away when he is told he can't bring the orb. Sophie chases after him while Bethan watches the orb. Back on the bus, Josh attempts to steal the keys but accidentally steals Tom's father's Military Cross medal. The orb regenerates in front of Bethan whilst Sophie finds Nas and squabbles with him until Bethan reappears with the orb she has befriended and has named it Borb, much to Nas’ dismay. Tom finally takes off and leaves the four behind. Misha tries to stop him which causes a fight over the wheel and escalates when Misha shows his father's medal and he tries to get it back causing the bus to break through a barrier and hang over Avon Gorge. Bethan, Josh, Chelsea and Misha escape but Tom and Sophie fall with the bus over the cliff. Nas arrives and looks to see Borb levitating the bus saving Sophie and Tom. The group accept Borb into the team and the episode ends with a shot of the Clifton Suspension Bridge implying that they are close to Wallgate.
8	"Episode 8"	Steve Hughes	Lulu Raczka	April 1, 2022
The bus arrives at Wallgate where they find the place empty due to the place closing down back in 2015. Tom then goes into shock and is taken back to the bus where he is nursed by Chelsea. Josh lashes out at Borb who runs away. Nas finds him and sees a swarm of orbs surrounded by mysterious grey mist. The kids hurry back to bus, but are caught in the mist where the plant fertiliser returns and start to fill up the bus. Tom finally helps and blocks the windows and toilets. Borb then shows the group a memory of Tom's where it's revealed his father died and says that the voicemail was from when Tom was late for his tenth birthday party and is all he has left of him. Thinking they're all about to die, the group huddle up. After everything suddenly quietens down, they look out the window to see roots. Borb blasts through the roof to reveal the whole area has been covered by a forest. Nas theorises that Monkhouse was planning to save the world via extreme reforestation and evacuation of all human life. Although the gang believe that Monkhouse killed all human life on Earth, Sophie thinks that he wouldn't include himself in the extinction event. The gang then say goodbye to the bus and start to search for Dalton Monkhouse.
9	"Episode 9"	Steve Hughes	Ben Ward	April 1, 2022
Days later, the gang celebrate Misha's birthday but she dismisses them. They then find a large mansion and whilst inside, find out it is Monkhouse's private mansion. They then split up looking for Monkhouse. Nas, Josh and Bethan rencounter an again regenerated Stevil who chases them throughout the house. Bethan tries to reason with Stevil but is taken to a secret room where they find Stevil absorbing Bethan. Stevil shields himself from the gang but using Borb, the group use positive vibes to power Borb and fights back against Stevil causing him to explode. Bethan says that she thinks that Stevil wanted to keep her for himself. Borb has been overpowered by the positivity and dies. Sophie then sees a hidden door where they find Monkhouse's secret underground facility. They also find Monkhouse in stasis.
10	"Episode 10"	Steve Hughes	Paul Neafcy	April 1, 2022
The gang wake up Monkhouse from his stasis where he is revealed to be a selfish, rude and arrogant person. He then reveals he put the whole population in a 100 year stasis. Josh angrily tells him to show them where their parents are but is unable due to Stevil blowing up which caused the Kin Chip servers to break. He then steals Borb and fixes him believing that he isn't different and attempts to vaporize Nas but fails, the kids then tie up Monkhouse and take the Nexus Key, an omnipotent device. A hooded figure arrives at the house and is revealed to be Danny who reveals he joined a gang who had a party in Buckingham Palace and raided all the shops on Bond Street. He then reveals to Tom, Misha, and Sophie the leader of his gang: a 16 year-old girl named Lucy who somehow got them all Kin Chips. After the three don't agree to go along with her, she imprisons them. Borb manages to scare Lucy's gang off who then steals the Nexus Key off of Chelsea. She then locks them out of the base and confronts Monkhouse who reveals herself to be his daughter. She plans to wake, in her opinion, the best people in the world to then achieve world domination. Meanwhile, Tom tries to convince Danny to free them. Monkhouse manages to break free and steals the Nexus Key. Nas then bids farewell to him as he escapes in a pod and sets the whole place to be imploded within three minutes. Before he escapes, Nas reveals to an enraged Monkhouse he swiped the Nexus Key. Tossing the key to Chelsea, they escape the house before Lucy catches them. Danny then leaves Tom, Misha and Sophie behind and they escape after. Nas saves an injured Danny and Borb reveals he lifted up the bus from underground and the gang, with Danny, board it and fly away leaving Lucy who escapes the mansion and screams revenge after the mansion implodes. On the flying bus, Chelsea reveals to everyone she has the Nexus Key, and they all set out to save the world. Meanwhile on a sun setting beach, Monkhouse's escape pod is shown with footprints shown in the sand implying that Dalton Monkhouse survived.

== Production ==
=== Development ===
Pre-production began in August 2020.

=== Filming ===
Filming began by September 2020 in Portishead. Filming also occurred at Redcliffe Caves, Bristol, The Bottle Yard Studios, and other locations in South West England. Filming began at Clifton Down in February 2021. Braelawn Academy was made up of three schools: Writhlington School, Nailsea School and Badminton School. Filming also took place at The Eden Project, Cheddar Gorge, the Forest of Dean, Wookey Hole Caves and amusement parks in Brean.

=== Marketing ===
On 4 March 2022, Netflix released an official trailer for the series and announced that the series was set to premiere on 1 April 2022.

- Note, despite the evident cliffhanger at the end of the final episode, the show never got renewed, nor got a conclusion to the plot.
