= Nicholas Podany =

American actor

- Education: Juilliard School (BFA)
- Occupations: Actor, Musician
- Years active: 2012–present

Nicholas Podany is an American actor and musician.

== Early life ==
He attended the Juilliard School in New York City, graduating in 2018.

== Career ==
=== Stage ===
He played Albus Severus Potter in the New York production of Harry Potter and the Cursed Child in 2019 at Broadway's Lyric Theatre.

=== Television ===
His television roles have included The CW's Hart of Dixie, the Disney Channel's I Didn't Do It and Netflix series Archive 81. In 2021, he was cast in a live action version of The Powerpuff Girls; however, the series was later cancelled.

He had his first major screen role in 2023, where he could be seen as Joey in Apple TV+ science fiction comedy drama Hello Tomorrow! alongside Billy Crudup, Jacki Weaver and Hank Azaria.

In 2025, he was cast in Cold War-era spy thriller series Ponies featuring Emilia Clarke for Peacock.

=== Film ===
He portrays Billy Crystal in the Jason Reitman biographical comedy drama Saturday Night. The cast for the film were nominated for the Critics' Choice Movie Award for Best Acting Ensemble.

He had a role as Mercutio in the musical Juliet & Romeo.

== Personal life ==
He has English heritage through his mother. He is also a musician.

== Filmography ==
=== Film ===
Key
†	Denotes works that have not yet been released

Year	Title	Role	Notes
2024	Saturday Night	Billy Crystal	
2025	O Horizon	Anton	
2025	Juliet & Romeo	Mercutio	
2026	Ponderosa	Sponsor	
TBA	Rest and Relaxation †	TBA	Post-production

=== Television ===
Year	Title	Role	Notes
2012–2013	Hart of Dixie	Max	4 episodes
2014	I Didn't Do It	Max	Episode: "Lindylicious"
2022	Archive 81	Jonah Vos	Episode: "The Ferryman"
2022	Blue Bloods	Officer Mark Cooper	Episode: "Life During Wartime"
2023	Hello Tomorrow!	Joey	10 episodes
2023	Law & Order	Matthew Nelson	Episode: "Appraisal"
2024	Chicago P.D.	Cam Boyd	Episode: "Unpacking"
2025	Invincible	Teen Boy #1 (voice)	Episode: "This Was Supposed to Be Easy"
2025	Doc	Wes	Episode: "Man Plans"
2026	Ponies	Ray Szymanski	8 episodes
2026	Furious	Blanchard	Episode: "Flash Flood"
