= List of Wednesday characters =

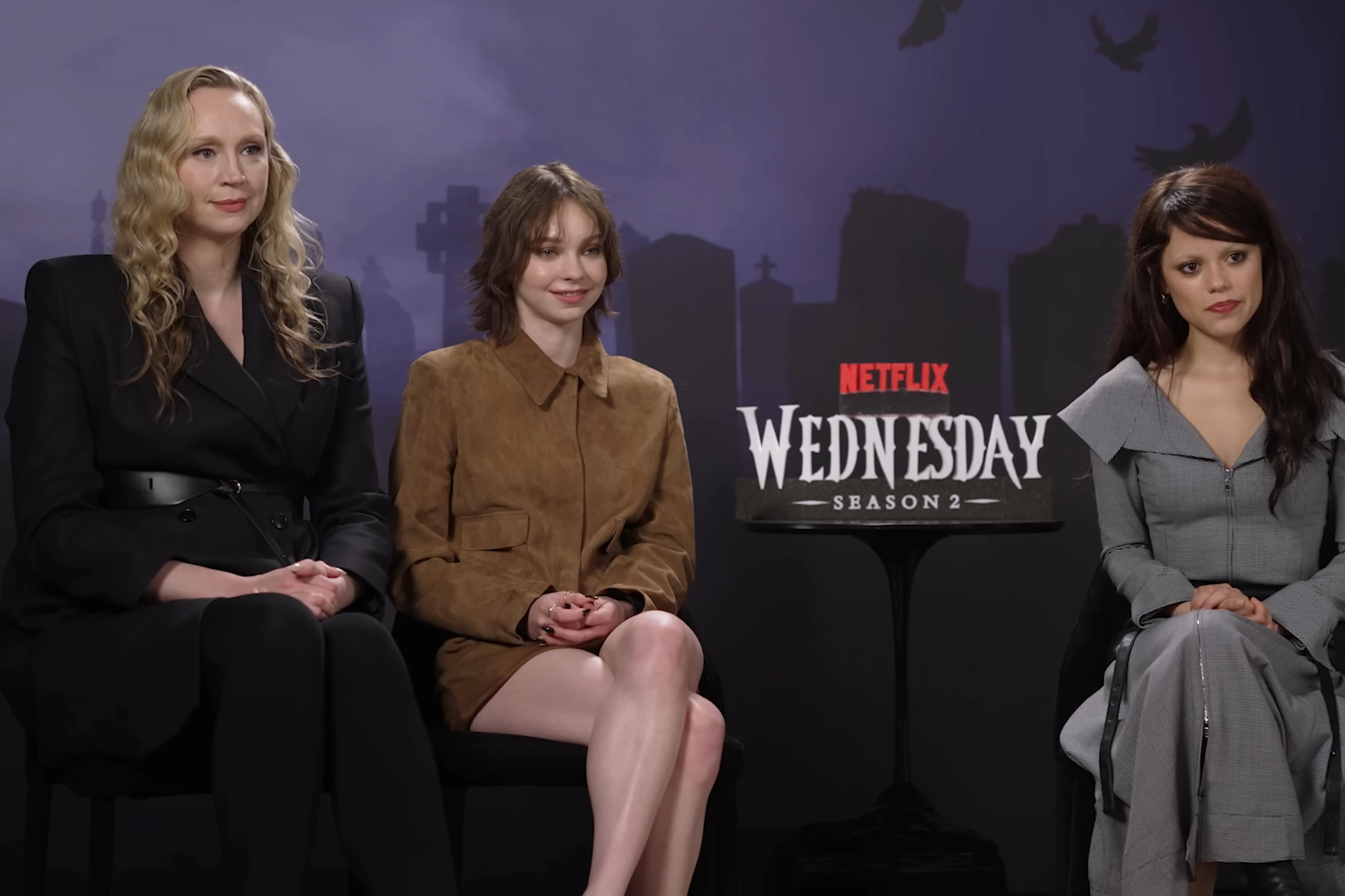
From left to right: Gwendoline Christie (Larissa Weems), Emma Myers (Enid Sinclair), and Jenna Ortega (Wednesday Addams) in a 2025 interview

This is a list of characters from the Netflix series Wednesday (2022–present).

== Overview ==
Portrayed by	Character	Species	Appearances		
Portrayed by	Character	Species	Season 1	Season 2	Season 3
Jenna Ortega Karina Váradi^{Y} Emily Ring^{Y}	Wednesday Addams	Psychic (Raven)	Main	Main	Main
Jenna Ortega	Goody Addams	Spirit; Former Psychic (Raven)	Main	Mentioned	
Gwendoline Christie Oliver Wickham^{Y}	Principal Larissa Weems	Spirit; Former Shapeshifter	Main	Recurring	
Riki Lindhome	Dr. Valerie Kinbott	Human	Main		
Jamie McShane Ben Wilson^{Y}	Sheriff Donovan Galpin	Human	Main	Recurring	
Hunter Doohan	Tyler Galpin	Hyde	Main	Main	Main
Percy Hynes White	Xavier Thorpe	Psychic (Raven)	Main	Mentioned	
Emma Myers	Enid Sinclair	Werewolf	Main	Main	Main
Joy Sunday	Bianca Barclay	Siren	Main	Main	Main
Georgie Farmer	Ajax Petropolus	Gorgon	Main	Main	Main
Naomi J. Ogawa	Yoko Tanaka	Vampire	Main		
Moosa Mostafa	Eugene Ottinger	Swarmer	Main	Main	Main
Christina Ricci	Laurel Gates; Marilyn Thornhill	Human	Main	Guest	
Victor Dorobantu	Thing	Hand; Belonged to Isaac Night	Recurring	Main	Main
Luyanda Unati Lewis-Nyawo	Sheriff Ritchie Santiago	Human	Recurring	Main	Main
Isaac Ordonez	Pugsley Addams	Spark	Guest	Main	Main
Luis Guzmán Lucius Hoyos^{Y}	Gomez Addams	Human; Former Spark	Guest	Main	Main
Catherine Zeta-Jones Gwen Jones^{Y}	Morticia Addams (née Frump)	Psychic (Dove)	Guest	Main	Main
Steve Buscemi	Principal Barry Dort	Pyro		Main	
Owen Painter	Isaac Night; Slurp	Zombie; Former DaVinci		Main	
Billie Piper	Isadora Capri	Werewolf		Main	Main
Noah B. Taylor	Bruno Yuson	Werewolf		Main	
Evie Templeton	Agnes DeMille	Vanisher		Main	Main
Joanna Lumley	Grandmama Hester Frump	Psychic (Raven)		Recurring	Main
Eva Green	Ophelia Frump	Psychic (Raven)		Stand-in	Main
Tommie Earl Jenkins Ismail Kesu^{Y}	Mayor Noble Walker	Human	Recurring		
Iman Marson	Lucas Walker	Human	Recurring		
George Burcea	Lurch	Human	Guest		
Joonas Suotamo	Lurch	Human		Recurring	Recurring
Heather Matarazzo	Judi Spannagel	Avian; Former Human		Recurring	
Frances O'Connor Kristen Smith^{Y}	Françoise Galpin (née Night)	Hyde	Mentioned	Recurring	
Winona Ryder	Tabitha	TBA			Recurring
Chris Sarandon	Balthazar	TBA			TBA
Noah Taylor	Cyrus	TBA			TBA
Oscar Morgan	Atticus	TBA			TBA
Kennedy Moyer	Daisy	TBA			TBA
Calum Ross	Rowan Laslow	DaVinci	Guest		
William Houston	Joseph Crackstone	Zombie; Former Human	Guest		
Nitin Ganatra	Dr. Reggie Anwar	Human	Guest		
Lewis Hayes	Garrett Gates	Human	Guest		
Fred Armisen Jonathan Horvat^{Y}	Uncle Fester Addams	Spark	Guest	Guest	Guest
Haley Joel Osment	Chet LaTroy; Kansas City Scalper	Human		Guest	
Christopher Lloyd	Professor Orloff	Human		Guest	
Thandiwe Newton	Dr. Rachael Fairburn	Human		Guest	
Anthony Michael Hall	Ron Kruger	Human		Guest	
Liv Spencer	Varicose	Human		Guest	Guest
Lady Gaga	Rosaline Rotwood	Spirit; Former Psychic (Raven)		Guest	
Casper Van Dien	Arnold Hunt; Gideon Sterling	Human	Mentioned	Guest	
Lena Headey	TBA	TBA			Guest
Andrew McCarthy	TBA	TBA			Guest
James Lance	TBA	TBA			Guest

== Outcast overview ==
In the series, the term Outcast refers to anyone who has supernatural or paranormal abilities. It is because of their differences that Outcasts refer to regular humans as "Normies" and are often at odds with each other. Nevermore Academy is a school attended almost exclusively by several different species of Outcasts. They are sorted into the different categories listed below:

- Avians – Outcasts that can control birds.
- Cyclopes – Outcasts that were first mentioned in the episode "Hyde and Woe Seek" where Principal Barry Dort confirmed during the Outcast Day of Remembrance that they are extinct.
- DaVincis – Outcasts with telekinetic abilities.
- Faceless – Outcasts who have no eyes, noses, or mouths. Despite having no mouth, they can still eat food.
- Gorgons – Outcasts with snakes instead of hair that cause anyone who looks at them to turn to stone. The transformation does not appear to be permanent as in Greek legends but wears off after a few hours.
- Hydes – Mutated Outcasts who are banned from attending Nevermore Academy. It takes a traumatic event to unleash a person's Hyde form.
- Minotaurs – Outcasts that were first mentioned in the episode "Hyde and Woe Seek" where Principal Barry Dort confirmed during the Outcast Day of Remembrance that they are extinct.
- Psychics – Outcasts who can experience psychic visions. Some psychics are also experts at witchcraft. Two types of psychics exist: Doves have a kinder personality and see positive outcomes from their visions while Ravens have a more cynical personality and have a negative outlook regarding their visions.
- Pyros – Outcasts who possess pyrokinesis (the ability to generate and control fire).
- Shapeshifters – Outcasts who can assume the form of anyone they encounter.
- Sirens – Outcasts whose siren songs can be used to brainwash and control anyone. Their songs will not work on anyone wielding an item made of Corinthian Coral. In addition, they can also turn their legs into a fish tail when submerged underwater.
- Sparks – Outcasts who possess electrokinesis (the ability to generate, store, and control electricity).
- Swarmers – Outcasts that can control arthropods.
- Vampires – Outcasts with extended lifespans that must wear sunglasses when in the sunlight. Though they can drink blood, the vampires eat other food as well.
- Vanishers – Outcasts who possess the ability to turn themselves invisible.
- Werewolves – Outcasts that assume bipedal wolf-like forms during a full moon and can retract their claws during the day.
- Yetis – Outcasts that were first mentioned in the episode "Woe What a Night", that had gone extinct in the 1950s. The "Abominable Snowman" name was considered offensive to them.

== Main characters ==
=== Wednesday Addams ===
Wednesday Addams (portrayed by Jenna Ortega as a teenager, Karina Varadi as a young girl) is the daughter of Gomez and Morticia Addams. Wednesday is a Raven; a psychic who can see dark visions of past, present and future. She is new to Nevermore Academy, having been admitted mid-term after she was expelled from Nancy Regan High School for trying to kill her brother Pugsley's bullies by dropping piranhas in the school pool. Wednesday is introduced to her new school and her roommate, Enid Sinclair.

Upon her arrival, she tries to run away from Nevermore, but decides to stay to investigate the Hyde monster's murders after she is almost killed by Rowan Laslow and witnesses him being murdered by the Hyde soon after. Disapproving of the scheming employed by Bianca to win the annual Poe Cup boat race, she becomes Enid's copilot and following the race credo that there are no rules, applies her wits and wins the race for their House. Shortly afterwards, she discovers the Nightshade Library, which she starts to visit often. In one of her visions, it is revealed that Joseph Crackstone tried to burn her ancestor Goody Addams alive. Wednesday also finds a love interest in Tyler Galpin, going with him to the school dance after Thing pretends to be her and asks him out. After her father is arrested for murder, Wednesday and Morticia work together and discover that Garrett was not killed by Gomez, but by the nightshade poison he had in his pocket. She notices that Laurel Gates, presumed drowned as a girl, is still alive and witnesses Noble Walker being run over by a car. She attends Mayor Walker's funeral and runs into her Uncle Fester afterwards. With his help, she discovers from Nathaniel Faulkner's journal that the monster she was looking for is called a Hyde. While she goes on a date with Tyler, Goody's journal is stolen and Thing is stabbed. Wednesday later discovers that Tyler is the Hyde and deduces that his master is Marilyn Thornhill. She confronts Thornhill with Principal Larissa Weems. After Weems is killed, Wednesday is knocked out and taken to Joseph Crackstone's crypt so Thornhill can use her blood to break the bloodlock which was placed on him by Goody Addams. After escaping from the crypt, she goes to Nevermore and kills Joseph Crackstone, having been advised on how to do so by Goody.

At the start of Season Two, Wednesday uses her Raven powers to track down an elusive serial killer. The misuse of her gift renders it unreliable and frequently inaccessible, straining her relationship with Morticia. She has a vision of Enid's premature death and is determined to prevent it. Wednesday discovers that the nearby WIllow Hill Insane Asylum has been using Outcasts for experimental purposes. Following Tyler's capture at the end of Season One, he is confined there for treatment but breaks out following a massive power failure caused by Uncle Fester, who had been working undercover there for Wednesday. After being in a coma for two weeks due to being defenestrated by Tyler, she gains Larissa Weems as her new spirit guide. The season also confirms that Wednesday is allergic to color. Following the death of Isaac Night who had intended to use Pugsley as the power source for a machine he had built to remove Françoise Galpin's Hyde, and Francoise's suicide, Wednesday and Thing are joined by Uncle Fester in searching for Enid, who is trapped in her werewolf form.

=== Goody Addams ===
Goody Addams (portrayed by Jenna Ortega) is Wednesday's deceased ancestor from the 1600s. She is a witch, psychic and ghost that only Wednesday can see in her visions, which reveal that Goody escaped the extermination of Jericho's Outcasts at the hands of Joseph Crackstone, the founder of Jericho, Vermont, whom she later killed, and placed under a bloodlock on Crackstone's crypt using her own blood. Goody also founded the Nightshade Society, a secret society that was dedicated to fighting for equality between Outcasts and Normies which later evolved into an elite social club. Shortly after Marilyn Thornhill uses Wednesday's blood to resurrect Crackstone (a bloodlock can only be broken by the blood of a direct descendent of the person who placed it) and leaves her to die in the crypt, Goody appears and heals her mortal stab wound; but warns Wednesday that after she does so, Wednesday will never see her again.

=== Larissa Weems ===
Larissa Weems (portrayed by Gwendoline Christie as an adult, Oliver Wickha as a young woman) is Nevermore Academy's shapeshifting principal and Morticia's former roommate when they were Nevermore students. She introduces Wednesday to the school and her roommate, Enid, despite Wednesday's lack of interest. In "Chapter II: Woe Is the Loneliest Number", it is revealed Weems shapeshifted into Rowan after the real Rowan is killed by a Hyde. In "Chapter VIII: A Murder of Woes", she disguises herself as Tyler to trick Marilyn Thornhill into confessing that she's actually Laurel Gates, who manipulated Tyler into killing victims as part of her plan to resurrect Joseph Crackstone, her deceased ancestor from the 1600s, and wipe the Outcasts from existence. After Weems reveals herself, Thornhill kills Weems by injecting her with nightshade poison.

In season two, Weems is succeeded by Barry Dort. Larissa Weems later returns as Wednesday's spirit guide. When Wednesday states that it would be impossible as the Addams family's spirit guides are usually a dead relative, Weems reveals that they are 13th cousins twice removed. She is annoyed upon learning Dort was picked to succeed her as Nevermore's principal when she did not have him on her list of possible successors and he doesn't plan on honoring her sacrifice at the Outcast Day of Remembrance ceremony. Morticia soon starts to interact with Weems as her spirit guide when she detects her. Following the deaths of Isaac Night and Françoise Galpin, Weems returns to the afterlife.

=== Dr. Valerie Kinbott ===
Dr. Valerie Kinbott (portrayed by Riki Lindhome) is Wednesday's Nevermore Academy-appointed therapist from the local town of Jericho. She is killed by the Hyde after Wednesday suspects her of being its master due to seeing her in the forest with Xavier.

=== Donovan Galpin ===
Donovan Galpin (portrayed by Jamie McShane as an adult, Ben Wilson as a young man) is Jericho's skeptical sheriff who dislikes Nevermore, is suspicious of Wednesday, and has a history with Gomez dating back to Gomez's time as a Nevermore student.

In season two, Galpin has resigned (or been forced) from his position as Sheriff and become a private investigator. He was later found dead in his house. Wednesday and Uncle Fester later learn that Judi Spannegel was responsible for his death and that of private investigator Carl Bradbury. Galpin later appears as an hallucination that speaks to Tyler following his escape from Willow Hill Insane Asylum.

=== Tyler Galpin ===
Tyler Galpin (portrayed by Hunter Doohan in human form, motion-captured by Daniel Himschoot in Hyde form) is Sheriff Galpin and Françoise Galpin's son, Isaac Night's nephew, and a barista at a local coffee shop who has a romantic interest in Wednesday. He is later revealed to be a Hyde due to his late mother's having being one as well. During his attack on Wednesday in the season one finale, Tyler's Hyde form was attacked by Enid's werewolf form defending Wednesday until Tyler was shot by his father, not fatally. Tyler was taken to Willow Hill Insane Asylum as the only facility capable of safely confining him.

In season two, Tyler Galpin was incarcerated in a special cell in Willow Hill. Dr. Rachael Fairburn brought Laurel Gates in to help control him and possibly treat him. Amidst the mass breakout instigated by Uncle Fester, Tyler was freed by Gates. However, he gives her a five-second head start, chases after her in his Hyde form, and impales Gates with his claws, killing her. Tyler's Hyde form encountered Wednesday and defenestrated her. When the Sheriff's Department arrived to control the breakout, their guns could not stop Tyler's Hyde form and he escaped.

After a hallucination of his father, Tyler's Hyde kills a hitman Judi Spannagel hired to kill the escaped Willow Hill patients. With help from his mother Françoise, who was actually alive and imprisoned at Willow Hill until released by Wednesday. Morticia made a deal with Françoise to remove Tyler from Jericho and never return in exchange for not turning them over to the Sheriff. Neither Morticia nor Wednesday knew Isaac Night has a plan to take revenge on the Addams family that involves his trying to remove Françoise's Hyde.

After Pugsley is kidnapped, Tyler is strapped to a table by his mother so his Hyde form can be removed. Thanks to Wednesday's sabotage of Night's Hyde removal equipment, Tyler first attacks Isaac and then fights his mother. With Françoise hanging from the edge, Tyler tries to save her; but Françoise commits suicide by letting herself fall. At the graves of his parents, Tyler is approached by Isadora Capri, who offers to let him join a group of Hydes. He accepts after hearing that Capri's father was a Hyde.

=== Xavier Thorpe ===
Xavier Thorpe (portrayed by Percy Hynes White) is a student at Nevermore with dream psychic and art-animating abilities. He is the ex-boyfriend of Bianca Barclay and former roommate of Rowan Laslow, as well as a member of the Nightshade Society. A talented artist, he has a private studio in an abandoned workshop on campus and often paints his psychic visions on canvas.

Soon after Wednesday arrives at Nevermore, Xavier saves her during Rowan's first attempt on her life. He then reveals they had previously met when they were ten years old at his godmother's funeral. (Wednesday saved him from being cremated after he hid in the casket during a game of hide-and-seek.) Xavier is consistently supportive of Wednesday and warns her to avoid Tyler, later explaining that Tyler and his friends had assaulted him and destroyed his mural the year before.

Wednesday suspects Xavier is the Hyde, because he always appears in the same places as the monster around the same time. She engineers his arrest. After discovering that Tyler is the true culprit Wednesday visits Xavier in jail and asks for his help, but he angrily refuses.

Xavier is later freed from a police car by Thing and comes to Wednesday's aid during her battle with the resurrected Joseph Crackstone. He shoots an arrow at Crackstone, who sends it back at him; but Wednesday took the arrow for him and orders him to evacuate the other students. After Crackstone and Tyler are defeated Xavier is released, all charges dropped. When Nevermore is closed for the remainder of the semester, Xavier gives Wednesday a cell phone as a gift so they can stay in touch.

In season two, Xavier has left Nevermore Academy and is currently attending Reichenbach Academy in Switzerland. His father, Vincent, withdrew him from Nevermore due to his son having been falsely accused of murder. Xavier sent Wednesday a portrait of crows on a tombstone, explaining that it was part of his latest vision.

=== Enid Sinclair ===
Enid Sinclair (portrayed by Emma Myers) is Wednesday's colorful werewolf roommate at Nevermore Academy who attempts to become her friend despite Wednesday's lack of interest. She comes from San Francisco, has older brothers, is a fan of the San Jose Sharks, and writes a Nevermore gossip blog. She is also a late bloomer who initially lacked the ability to turn into a werewolf, a source of tension between her and her mother.

Early in the series, Enid teams up with Wednesday to defeat Bianca and win the Poe Cup. She starts a romantic relationship with Ajax Petropolus, although she goes to the school dance with Lucas Walker after Ajax accidentally misses their first date. Later, Wednesday involves Enid and Tyler in her investigation of the Gates mansion, which almost got her and Enid killed by the Hyde. This makes Enid furious and causes her to briefly move out of their shared tower room. At the end of season one, Enid finally transforms into a werewolf to defeat Tyler in his Hyde form as he tries to murder Wednesday.

In season two, a prophecy Wednesday is given predicts Enid's death. Enid experiences a werewolf transformation without the full moon. Isadora Capri, a werewolf herself, informs Enid this means she may be turning into an Alpha Werewolf. This mean she may be unable to return to human form and would become a target for other werewolves. Capri advises Enid to lock herself up in the lupine pens for her own safety.

While in Wednesday's body, Enid learns the hard way that Wednesday's color allergy is real. In the season two finale, to help Wednesday escape death after being buried alive, she chooses to transform into a werewolf under the full moon. This decision may doom her to be forever trapped in her werewolf form. Having previously made a promise to Enid, Wednesday goes on a trip with Uncle Fester and Thing to bring Enid back and hopefully restore her to human form. Enid was last sighted five miles south of the Canadian border.

=== Bianca Barclay ===
Bianca Barclay (portrayed by Joy Sunday) is a siren who is a queen bee student at Nevermore Academy. One of the school's best students, she is the ex-girlfriend of Xavier Thorpe, who broke up with her after suspecting she had brainwashed him with her siren song. She is the current leader of the Nightshade Society.

Bianca initially competes with Wednesday at every opportunity and bullies her, but later opens up to Wednesday about her insecurities and becomes friendly with her. Later, it is revealed that Bianca's original name is Brandy Jane. She was once part of a cult called Morning Song with her mother Gabrielle, but escaped after learning its true purpose is to scam money from people. She subsequently enrolled in Nevermore on a scholarship.

During Parents' Weekend Gabrielle attempts to blackmail her into returning to Morning Song. Bianca agrees to help her on the condition that she will help her while Nevermore is on summer break, but then is done with Morning Song forever. Bianca bonds with Lucas Walker after warning him about Morning Song, and they give information to Wednesday for her investigation.

When Wednesday discovers Tyler is the Hyde, Bianca and the Nightshades assist her in capturing and interrogating him. However, when Wednesday starts torturing him they back out and alert Principal Weems. Weems gets the Sheriff not to file charges, but only if Wednesday is expelled. When the revived Joseph Crackstone launches an attack on Nevermore, Bianca uses her siren song to evacuate the school before aiding Wednesday in battle. She saves Wednesday by stabbing Crackstone from behind, allowing Wednesday to stab Crackstone in the heart and kill him for good.

In season two, Bianca puts her Siren mother Gabrielle into hiding at the Apple Hollow Inn so that her stepfather Gideon Sterling, who runs the Morning Song cult, won't find her. She is also used by Principal Barry Dort to brainwash Morticia into bringing Grandmama Frump to Nevermore to provide a large financial donation. When her mother is found in one of the rooms during the Sheriff Department's raid to find Uncle Fester, Bianca learns of it and uses her powers to make Sheriff Santiago forget about it. However, Dort finds Gabrielle and makes use of her and Bianca. Dort has Bianca brainwash Grandmama into donating all her money to Nevermore. Bianca is later brought into Dort's office where Gideon is in attendance and watches as Dort burns him alive after he demanded more money. After Agnes removes the Corinthian Coral pendant from Dort, Bianca brainwashes Dort into confessing to his crimes. Dort then takes Bianca hostage with the Jericho Sheriff's Department closing in, but she is saved by Ajax, who turns Dort to stone as the burned chandelier falls on his petrified body and shatters it, killing him.

=== Ajax Petropolus ===
Ajax Petropolous (portrayed by Georgie Farmer) is a Gorgon at Nevermore Academy who becomes a romantic interest of Enid's. He keeps his snake hair underneath a long beanie to avoid accidentally petrifying anyone. Ajax is a member of the Nightshade Society and teams with Xavier in the Poe Cup race.

In season two, Ajax learns Enid has developed a romantic interest with Bruno, causing Enid to let him down gently during a camping trip. He also helps Bianca in hiding her mother Gabrielle on campus. After Bianca brainwashes Dort into confessing to his crimes, causing the Sheriff's Department to close in, Ajax saves Bianca by turning Dort to stone as the burning chandelier falls onto his petrified body. As Nevermore closes early again, Ajax and Enid reconcile.

=== Yoko Tanaka ===
Yoko Tanaka (portrayed by Naomi J. Ogawa) is a vampire at Nevermore Academy of Japanese descent. She is a member of the Nightshade Society and a close friend of Enid and Divina. Yoko was originally Enid's right hand in the Poe Cup, but was replaced by Wednesday after Bianca sabotaged her by planting garlic bread in her dinner, which caused an allergic reaction that hospitalized her. However, Yoko quickly recovered and is on good terms with Bianca again after the competition. Enid temporarily moves into Yoko's room after an argument with Wednesday.

Yoko did not return for the second season.

=== Marilyn Thornhill ===
Marilyn Thornhill (portrayed by Christina Ricci) is a human botany teacher at Nevermore Academy. She was later revealed to be a descendant of Joseph Crackstone named Laurel Gates, the mastermind of the murders in Jericho, and master of Tyler Galpin's Hyde. Using the dismembered body parts of Tyler's victims, she performed a ritual to revive him and they attacked Nevermore Academy. After Crackstone is defeated, Laurel returned with a gun and tried to kill Wednesday, but was defeated with the help of Eugene Ottinger and his bees.

At the start of season two, it was mentioned that Gates is incarcerated. Her old campus house was loaned to Morticia so she would have time to decide if she wanted to run the Nevermore fundraiser. When Gates was brought to Willow Hill to cooperate with Dr. Fairburn, she speaks to Tyler, whose Hyde form tries to grab her. After seeing Uncle Fester, Gates informed Dr. Fairburn of his presence. During the prisoner revolt Gates freed Tyler, who gave her 5 seconds to run for her life. His Hyde form caught her and he impaled her with his claws, killing her.

Ricci previously played Wednesday in 1991's The Addams Familyand its 1993 sequel, Addams Family Values.

=== Eugene Ottinger ===
Eugene Ottinger (portrayed by Moosa Mostafa) is a Swarmer student at Nevermore Academy. He is shown to control bees and has a bee house on Nevermore Academy's property where he raises them. He becomes good friends with Wednesday when she joins his beekeeping club. On Outreach Day, Wednesday defends him from bullies and he covers for her as she looks for information on Joseph Crackstone, though they are both caught.

As part of Wednesday's investigation, they decide to stake out a cave suspected of belonging to the Hyde. Wednesday postponed their vigil when she went to the Raven Dance, but Eugene ignored her warning not to go into the woods alone. As a result, he is mauled by the Hyde, putting him in a coma.

Wednesday, blaming herself for the incident, visited him in the hospital and met his two mothers during Parents' Weekend. After waking up, Eugene gave her the description of a person that he witnessed setting fire to the cave. This helps Wednesday deduce that Marilyn Thornhill is Laurel Gates. During Crackstone's attack on Nevermore he saves Wednesday by attacking Gates with a swarm of bees, before Wednesday knocks her out.

In season two, Eugene becomes Pugsley's roommate as a favor to Wednesday. His powers have also expanded such that he can now control more arthopods than bees. After Pugsley was abducted, Isaac Night later used him to deliver a message to Wednesday. Following the deaths of Isaac Night and Françoise Galpin, Eugene officially becomes friends with Pugsley, who plans to visit his house over the summer break.

=== Ritchie Santiago ===
Ritchie Santiago (portrayed by Luyanda Unati Lewis-Nyawo) is the deputy at Jericho's sheriff department who worked under Donovan Galpin.

In season two, Ritchie became the new sheriff after Galpin resigned. Following the death of Professor Orloff, Ritchie intimidates Barry Dort into letting the sheriff's department provide security for Nevermore. She is present when Bianca brainwashes Dort into confessing his crimes. After Dort is turned to stone by Ajax and shattered by a chandelier, Ritchie has forensics pick up Dort's pieces. With Nevermore closed early again in light of the incident and Pugsley being abducted, Ritchie leads the sheriff's department in looking for Pugsley and his abductors. When the sheriff's department arrives at Nevermore upon being summoned by Gomez, Ritchie is among those that witnessed Françoise's suicide by falling to her death.

=== Thing ===
Thing (performed by Victor Dorobantu) is a sentient hand who lives with the Addams Family. Morticia dispatches Thing to keep an eye on Wednesday, but she immediately catches Thing spying on her and forces him to transfer his allegiance to her. Thing assists Wednesday in her investigation of the murders in Jericho, and even steals a dress for her to wear to the school dance. Later, he is attacked and stabbed with a knife by Marilyn Thornhill/Laurel Gates, but Uncle Fester saves his life using his electrokinesis powers.

Season two reveals that Thing used to be the right hand of Isaac Night, which was cut off when Morticia saved Gomez from Isaac's experiment to remove Françoise's Hyde form. As a side effect, Isaac's right hand gained a life of its own. After being snatched by Tyler when Thing tried to shoot Isaac with a crossbow, he is sewn back onto Isaac's right arm, making him complete again. During the final battle, the Addamses reached out to Thing, enabling him to defeat Isaac and rip out his mechanical heart, killing him. He then detached himself from Isaac's right arm, returning to his normal Addams state. Thing joined Wednesday and Uncle Fester in looking for Enid riding with them on Uncle Fester's motorcycle and sidecar as they head north to the Canadian border to begin the search.

=== Pugsley Addams ===
Pugsley Addams (portrayed by Isaac Ordonez) is the younger brother of Wednesday who joins her in attending Nancy Regan High School. When Wednesday found her brother locked in a locker, she got revenge on the school's water polo team by releasing piranhas into the swimming pool, stating that nobody picks on her brother but her.

In season two, Pugsley has enrolled in Nevermore Academy where he has perfected the Spark ability that he inherited and gains Eugene Ottinger as a roommate. He ends up reviving a mechanical heart corpse into a zombie state. After Isaac Night was restored, he kidnapped Pugsley and planned on using him as a battery to remove Tyler's Hyde form. He was rescued by his family. With Nevermore closed early again, Pugsley officially befriends Eugene. They discuss his coming to visit Eugene at his home.

=== Gomez Addams ===
Gomez Addams (portrayed by Luis Guzmán) is the father of Wednesday and Pugsley. He and Morticia are the ones who take Wednesday to Nevermore Academy after Wednesday was expelled from Nancy Reagan High School for unleashing piranhas on the water polo team that trapped Pugsley in a locker. Gomez also has a history with Donovan Galpin when he was suspected of killing Garrett Gates.

In season two, Gomez and Morticia enroll Pugsley into Nevermore Academy due to his electrokinesis having manifested. Both of them linger when Barry Dort is in need of donors as they make their home away from home in Marilyn Thornhill's old residence. Gomez would later recognize "Slurp" as Isaac Night which he later informs Morticia. During the Nevermore Gala, Gomez was present when Bianca brainwashed Dort into confessing to his crimes and when Wednesday blackmailed Grandmama Hester Frump into giving a worthy donation to the school. A flashback revealed that Gomez used to have electrokinesis until it was drained in Isaac Night's experiments from which Morticia saved him. Gomez later called the sheriff's department to Nevermore. Following the deaths of Isaac and Françoise Galpin, Gomez and Mortica return home with Pugsley and Lurch while Wednesday, Thing, and Uncle Fester head north to find Enid, who was last seen near the Canadian border.

=== Morticia Addams ===
Morticia Addams, née Frump (portrayed by Catherine Zeta-Jones) is the mother of Wednesday and Pugsley and the wife of Gomez. Morticia is also a psychic, albeit a "Dove" whose visions are comparatively benign. She and Gomez are the ones who take Wednesday to Nevermore Academy after Wednesday was expelled from Nancy Reagan High School for unleashing piranhas on the water polo team after they trapped Pugsley in a locker. It was also revealed that Morticia was the roommate of Larissa Weems when she attended Nevermore. Morticia does caution Wednesday not to sneak out of Nevermore Academy as she had already contacted every one of their relatives to notify her the moment Wednesday "darkens their doorstep." After Gomez was arrested during the Parents' Day event, Morticia helped Wednesday clear his name.

In season two, Morticia and Gomez enroll Pugsley at Nevermore Academy when his Spark powers manifested. Both of them linger when Barry Dort, in need of donors to support the school, persuades Morticia to head up the fund raising. They make their home away from home in Marilyn Thornhill's old residence. Morticia is briefly brainwashed by Bianca into having her estranged mother Hester Frump visit Nevermore Academy to provide a major donation. Morticia's family relationship with Wednesday was strained due to her dependence on Goody Addams' Book of Shadows to help Wednesday develop her psychic abilities.

Morticia is also shown as having a history with Françoise Galpin when she turns up alive and Morticia learns how Wednesday freed her from Willow Hill. As part of a deal, Morticia wants Françoise to remove Tyler from Jericho, never to return. Later that night, Morticia is told by Gomez that "Slurp" is really Isaac Night. Sensing Weems' spirit form, Morticia starts to interact with her. During the Nevermore Gala, Morticia spoke with Weems' spirit, who told her of Wednesday's new prophecy regarding the death of an Addams.

She was also present when Bianca brainwashed Dort into confessing to his crimes, and when Wednesday blackmailed Granny Frump into giving a worthy donation to Nevermore in Gomez's name. A flashback reveals that Morticia saved Gomez from Isaac Night's Hyde-removal experiment by slicing off Isaac's right hand, which led to its becoming Thing. Morticia assisted in the rescue of Pugsley.

Following Isaac and Françoise's deaths, Morticia has one final interaction with Weems' spirit. She then returns home with Gomez, Pugsley, and Lurch while Wednesday, Thing, and Uncle Fester head north to find Enid.

=== Barry Dort ===
Barry Dort (portrayed by Steve Buscemi) is the Pyro headmaster of Nevermore Academy following the death of Larissa Weems who did not list him on her list of possible successors.

In 2008, Barry Dort encountered a former soap opera actor named Arnold Hunt, who was working as a bartender at the Tiki Tails bar that was frequented by Outcasts and had Gabrielle as one of the siren performers. Dort pitched his idea for an Outcast cult called the Morning Song (after the location of Tiki Tails in Florida) while Arnold became his front man.

Upon being sworn in as the new headmaster of Nevermore Academy fifteen years later, Dort is seeking some donations to the academy and promotes the co-existence of normies and Outcasts. When it came to Morticia, Dort blackmailed Bianca into getting her to bring Grandmama Hester Frump to Nevermore to provide a donation in exchange for not terminating Bianca's scholarship. He also took a precaution to protect himself from siren abilities with an artifact that was made from Corinthian Coral. When it came to the Outcast Day of Remembrance which honors the extinct Outcast species such as Cyclopes, Minotaurs, and Yetis, Dort told Wednesday that he doesn't have plans to honor Weems, much to the dismay of Weems' spirit. Dort later finds where Bianca had hidden Gabrielle and makes use for them as he doesn't hold grudges. Because of Professor Orloff's murder by Isaac Night, Dort was intimidated by Sheriff Ritchie Santiago to have the sheriff's department provide security for the upcoming gala. Using Bianca, Dort brainwashes Grandmama Frump into giving her entire fortune to Nevermore while proposing an extension to Nevermore in her honor dedicated to the training of future morticians. Then he had Bianca in his office by the time her stepfather Arnold in his Gideon Sterling alias arrive. She witnesses Dort burning Arnold alive when he demanded much more money from Dort. Thanks to Agnes DeMille acting on Wednesday's orders during Agnes' dance with Enid, Bianca was able to brainwash Dort into confessing his crimes (revealing that he planned to defraud Nevermore and flee to Venezuela). As the Sheriff's Department converged, Dort took Bianca hostage and accidentally set one of the chandeliers on fire. Ajax saves Bianca by turning Dort to stone and he is shattered by the falling chandelier. Sheriff Santiago had forensics pick up the pieces of Dort. Following the incident, Nevermore was closed early once again.

=== Isaac Night ===
Isaac Night (portrayed by Owen Painter) is the brother of Françoise Galpin and the maternal uncle of Tyler Galpin. He started out as a story about a DaVinci boy who made a mechanical heart to replace his own and indulged in mad science. Using a lab built by Augustus Stonehearst, Isaac used Gomez as the power supply for an experiment that involved removing Françoise's Hyde form. Morticia saved Gomez by slicing off Isaac's right hand, which later became Thing. When he died, Isaac was buried in an unmarked grave near a skull tree.

Years later, Pugsley hears the legend and accidentally brings the boy back to life as a zombie that he names "Slurp". Despite Pugsley and Eugene working to keep him under control, "Slurp" breaks free on many occasions and eats the brains of anyone he encounters, which regenerates his body and his brain. Following an incident during a camping trip, "Slurp" is remanded to Willow Hill. He briefly has Fester Addams as a cellmate. Amidst the mass breakout, "Slurp" kills Dr. Rachel Fairburn and Stonehearst and eats their brains. Judi Spannagel later mentions in a press conference that he, alongside Fester and Tyler, is still at large. During the Day of the Dead festival at Pilgrim World, "Slurp" kills a patron in the "Haunted Hacienda", after which he regains his power of speech and acknowledges Pugsley as a friend. While Pugsley provides a diversion for the Sheriff's Department, "Slurp" exits the Hacienda and Gomez recognizes him as Isaac Night. Gomez would later tell Morticia that "Slurp" is Isaac.

At the same time, Isaac visits Judi. After killing Judi and reuniting with Françoise, he performs various experiments to keep her alive, from purging the Hyde from her (which was disrupted by Wednesday, Enid, and Agnes) to giving Françoise a blood transfusion from Tyler. Following Dort's death, Isaac confronts Wednesday in the graveyard and chloroforms her. After forcibly reattaching Thing to his right arm and burying Wednesday alive, Isaac performs an experiment that would remove Tyler's Hyde from him, using Pugsley as the power source. He fights the Addams family before Thing regains sentience and rips out Isaac's mechanical heart, killing him for good.

=== Isadora Capri ===
Isadora Capri (portrayed by Billie Piper) is a werewolf music teacher. She is also shown to perform music for the inmates at Willow Hill, and has extensive knowledge about Hydes as her old boyfriend was one. After witnessing Enid turn into a werewolf when the moon was not full, Capri tells Enid that this is the trait of an Alpha Werewolf. As she tells it, if an Alpha transforms under a full moon there is a real possibility that the Alpha Werewolf will not be able to revert to its human self at sunrise. If that happens, the Alpha will be hunted down by other werewolves as a matter of self-preservation. Capri makes sure that Enid keeps herself locked up in the Lupine cages for her own safety. Following the early closure of Nevermore and the deaths of Françoise Galpin and Isaac Night, Capri approached Tyler at his parents' grave and offered him the chance to join a group of Hydes. Though Tyler smelled that Capri is a werewolf, she told him that her father is a Hyde, implying that she is actually a hybrid of both species.

=== Bruno Yuson ===
Bruno Yuson (portrayed by Noah B. Tyler) is a werewolf who becomes Enid's latest love interest during season two. When in Enid's body, Wednesday learns that Bruno has a girlfriend across the seas and uses this opportunity to break up with him. Bruno explains himself to Enid, stating that he called it off with his old girlfriend Sofia in the Philippines. Unfortunately, Sofia arrives at the Nevermore Gala, leading to Enid doing her special dance with Agnes. After Nevermore is closed early, Bruno and Sofia leave for their homes.

=== Agnes DeMille ===
Agnes DeMille (portrayed by Evie Templeton) is a Vanisher who is a superfan of Wednesday. She has been stalking Wednesday since the end of season one. Agnes revealed her abilities after Wednesday saved Enid and Bruno from a knife-related trap. She also placed Wednesday's manuscript in the wood of the bonfire in the first episode of the season. Since then, Agnes has used her abilities to pop up in Wednesday's presence. The one time it did not work was when certain conditions gave her position away to Uncle Fester who compared her supposedly silent movements to "a herd of juvenile chupacabra" and advised her to work on her breath control. In the second half of the season, after realizing she will never replace Enid as Wednesday's best friend Agnes joins Enid in her dance and uses her invisibility to snatch Barry Dort's Corinthian Coral pendant. This enables Bianca to brainwash him into admitting his crimes. Agnes drops her obsessive nature towards Wednesday and becomes a genuine friend to both her and Enid. She helped save Wednesday's life in the finale after she was buried alive. It is also revealed that her Normie mother has remarried and has her own family; and her father (presumably an Outcast) is a rich businessman.

=== Grandmama Hester Frump ===
Grandmama Hester Frump (portrayed by Joanna Lumley) is the mother of Morticia and grandmother of Wednesday and Pugsley, as well as a wealthy mortuary mogul. Principal Barry Dort wants Morticia to bring Grandmama Hester Frump to Nevermore Academy to make a donation as she did years ago. It is also shown that Grandmama has a strained relationship with Morticia due to an incident involving Morticia's sister Ophelia. Because of Dort forcing Bianca Barclay to brainwash Morticia, Grandmama Frump arrives at Nevermore Academy with her servant Varicose and backs up Wednesday on her mission. When Grandmama asks Morticia to give Wednesday Goody's Book of Shadows back Morticia burns it, shocking Grandmama. Dort later uses Bianca's siren song to brainwash Grandmama Frump into donating her fortune to Nevermore. He even shows her a building he proposes to build in her honor that would enable Outcasts to learn how to be morticians, and plans to discuss with her on which teachers he can fire. After Bianca exposes Dort's crimes which leads to his death, Wednesday blackmails Grandmama into giving Nevermore a worthy donation in Gomez's name. Following the deaths of Françoise Galpin and Isaac Night, Grandmama Frump was revealed to be keeping Ophelia in a cell in her house as she and Varicose find her writing in blood on the wall "Wednesday Must Die".

=== Ophelia Frump ===
Ophelia Frump (portrayed by Eva Green) is Grandmama's second daughter, Morticia's younger sister, and Wednesday's aunt. Like her mother and her niece Wednesday, Ophelia is a Raven, one whose psychic visions tend to be dark and disturbing. During her second year at Nevermore, she experienced a dark vision that caused black tears to run down her face, indicating she was losing control of her Raven powers. She was withdrawn from the school and no one has seen her since. Grandmama is later confirmed to be secretly holding her in her mansion.

== Recurring characters ==
=== Lurch ===
Lurch (portrayed by George Burcea in season one, Joonas Suotamo in season two onward) is the towering butler and chauffeur of the Addams Family who mostly makes inarticulate moans that are understood by the Addams Family. He was first seen driving Gomez, Morticia, and Wednesday to Nevermore Academy so that they can enroll Wednesday in the school.

In season two, Lurch was with Gomez and Morticia when they lingered at Nevermore Academy due to Barry Dort needing more financial donors.

=== Noble Walker ===
Noble Walker (portrayed by Tommie Earl Jenkins as an adult, Ishmael Kesu Ahmed as a younger man) is the mayor of Jericho. He owns the Pilgrim World theme park. Three decades ago, Noble was the Sheriff when Donovan Galpin was a deputy. Walker covered up the accidental death of Garrett Gates at the hands of Gomez Addams and Morticia Frump. He was often annoyed with the shenanigans from Nevermore Academy.

Noble was hospitalized after being hit by a car, which put him into a coma. His life support was unplugged by Marilyn Thornhill/Laurel Gates, probably because were he to emerge from the coma, he knew too much.

It was not shown yet who succeeded Walker as the Mayor of Jericho.

=== Lucas Walker ===
Lucas Walker (portrayed by Iman Marson) is the son of Mayor Noble Walker. Along with his friends Carter and Jonah, he works at Pilgrim World and often bullies Nevermore students. He is seriously bigoted against Outcasts.

=== Judi Spannagel ===
Judi Spannagel (portrayed by Heather Matarazzo) is an executive assistant at Willow Hill Psychiatric Hospital who was first seen when Wednesday visits Willow Hill Psychiatric Hospital to see Tyler Galpin. When Wednesday and Uncle Fester find their way into L.O.I.S. (short for Long-term Outcast Integration Study), they discover the thought-to-be-dead patients inside, like the alien-like Patricia Redcar, the half-faceless Julian Meiojas, an unidentified teenage Frankenstein's monster, an unidentified she-wolf, a zombie-masked patient, and an unnamed timid patient. Judi then shows up, and is revealed to be the murderer of private investigator Carl Bradbury, daughter of Augustus Stonehearst, and true chief psychiatrist of Willow Hill. She had gained Avian abilities from her father's experiments, and used her crows (including a one-eyed crow) to kill first Bradbury and later Donovan Galpin. When Uncle Fester causes a targeted lightning storm that shuts down the power to Willow Hill, it releases all the prisoners from their cells as Judi flees from the ones that she experimented on. Two weeks later, Judi has hired a hitman to take out the escaped prisoners. While she mentions that she will become interim director following the death of Dr. Rachael Fairburn, Judi mentions that Fester Addams, Tyler Galpin, and "Slurp" are still at large. When Judi confronts Wednesday in her hospital room after she wakes up from her coma, Wednesday makes a comment about her illegal activities as Judi claims that the sheriff's department won't be able to find them. Later that night, Judi is confronted by "Slurp" (Isaac Night), who addresses her by name. Agnes later finds her dead in Françoise's car, having been murdered by Isaac offscreen.

=== Françoise Galpin ===
Françoise Galpin, née Night (portrayed by Frances O'Connor) is the wife of Donovan Galpin, the mother of Tyler Galpin, and the sister of Isaac Night. She has a history with Morticia Addams and Larissa Weems. Though thought to be dead, she was actually locked up in the secret LOIS part of Willow Hill. Françoise was freed by Wednesday amidst the chaos. She later met with Morticia and struck a deal to get Tyler away from Nevermore. She fulfilled her end of the deal. However, while Françoise kept Tyler away from Nevermore, they remained in Jericho. While tending to Tyler despite showing symptoms that she is dying, Françoise was approached by a revived Isaac, who helped her and Tyler out. His attempt to purge the Hyde from Françoise at Willow Hill was disrupted by Wednesday, Enid Sinclair, and Agnes DeMille. Isaac had Tyler use his blood in a blood transfusion to Françoise to buy time. After Pugsley Addams was abducted to be the battery for Isaac's repetition of the attempt to remove Françoise's Hyde at Willow Hill, Françoise had Tyler strapped to the table to have his Hyde form removed, saying it is too late for her. Because of Wednesday's sabotage of Isaac's equipment at Nevermore, Françoise and Tyler fight each other in their Hyde forms. When Françoise hangs from the side of the Nevermore clock tower that housed Isaac's lab, Tyler tries to save her. Françoise chose to kill herself by deliberately dropping off the building. She landed on the werewolf statue in front of the approaching Sheriff's Department deputies. Françoise was buried next to her husband in the Jericho cemetery in the grave where she had allegedly been interred years before.

== Other characters ==
=== Rowan Laslow ===
Rowan Laslow (portrayed by Callum Ross) is a DaVinci student at Nevermore Academy. He is the roommate of Xavier Thorpe and on the fencing team. He caused trouble for Wednesday. Rowan is later killed by Tyler Galpin's Hyde form. Larissa Weems covers up the incident by posing as Rowan with her shapeshifting powers.

=== Joseph Crackstone ===
Joseph Crackstone (portrayed by William Houston) is a Pilgrim and Laurel Gates' ancestor, who hated and hunted Outcasts. He was resurrected by Laurel to attack Nevermore Academy and exterminate all Outcasts. Crackstone was slain by Wednesday, with the help of Bianca.

=== Reggie Anwar ===
Dr. Reggie Anwar (portrayed by Nitin Ganatra) is Jericho's coroner. He was shot in the head by Marilyn Thornhill/Laurel Gates and staged to look like a suicide. Prior to his murder, Reggie was due to retire shortly after this and go on a cruise with his wife.

=== Garrett Gates ===
Garrett Gates (portrayed by Lewis Hayes) was a Normie in Jericho when Gomez Addams was a student at Nevermore. He was infatuated with Morticia Frump, which infatuation proceeded to complete obsession. It was alleged that Gomez killed Garrett, but there was insufficient evidence to support this. Decades later, it was discovered that while attempting to poison the entire student body of Nevermore at his father's behest, Garrett got into a fight with Gomez that caused the vial of nightshade poison in his pocket to shatter, fatally poisoning him via skin absorption. This caused him to go crazy as the poison took effect. As he was about to kill Gomez, Morticia ran him through with a sword and he fell off the second floor balcony into the courtyard. He landed directly in front of Larissa Weems, terrifying her.

=== Uncle Fester ===
Uncle Fester Addams (portrayed by Fred Armisen) is Wednesday and Pugsley's uncle, and Gomez's brother. He is a Spark who can generate electricity. While not a student at Nevermore Academy, Fester did sneak in to see Gomez on occasion. For some time he went on many adventures around the world with Thing as his partner-in-crime. Their last safe-cracking job (in Kalamazoo) went wrong and almost cost them their lives.

Fester taught Wednesday many skills during her childhood, such as kung fu. Fester mastered that discipline while he was imprisoned in a Tibetan monastery for five years.

Following Mayor Noble Walker's funeral, Wednesday runs into Uncle Fester, who is in town to lay low after robbing a bank in Boston and stealing a motorcycle and sidecar. He helps Wednesday with her monster investigation, including spying on Xavier and telling her about Hydes. Fester revives Thing with electric shocks after Thing was stabbed by Marilyn Thornhill/Laurel Gates.

In season two, flashbacks reveal that Uncle Fester used a very young Wednesday as a getaway driver for a bank heist. He spent his youth in and out of psychiatric hospitals, where he enjoyed his treatments, particularly electroshock therapy. In the present, Wednesday enlisted Uncle Fester to get into Willow Hill, where he was briefly incarcerated. After causing a disturbance at the Apple Hollow Inn, Uncle Fester is arrested by the Jericho Sheriff's Department. They find false documents of his various identities, including the one he used to rob the Boston bank. He was committed to Willow Hill where he enlisted the lunch lady, Louise, as a contact. Uncle Fester is directed to the location of LOIS by Augustus Stonehearst. He is ambushed by the guards when Laurel Gates informs Dr. Rachel Fairburn about him, and is locked in the same cell as "Slurp," aka Isaac Night. Wednesday later frees him. They learn that LOIS is short for "Long-term Outcast Integration Study" – experiments done by Judi Spannagel that gave Outcast powers to Normies. Uncle Fester used his Spark powers to cause a blackout, releasing all the Willow Hill inmates. After saying goodbye to Louise, he was able to flee during the chaos. Judi Spannagel would later mention at a press conference that Fester is still at large. Following the deaths of Isaac Night and Françoise Galpin, Fester accompanies Wednesday and Thing north to look for Enid, who is trapped in her werewolf form.

=== Chet LaTroy ===
Chet LaTroy (portrayed by Haley Joel Osment) is a down-on-his-luck beauty school dropout who operated as a serial killer called the Kansas City Scalper in Kansas City, Missouri for 12 years. Wednesday allowed herself to be taken captive by Chet, which enabled her to sneak Thing into his house. When Thing emerged from his hiding place, he beat up Chet. Wednesday chopped off Chet's hair and left an anonymous tip for the police. Morticia would later find out about Wednesday's encounter with Chet.

=== Professor Orloff ===
Professor Orloff (portrayed by Christopher Lloyd) is a biology teacher at Nevermore Academy whose severed head is kept alive in a jar. His life support system was constructed by Isaac Night at the time when Augustus Stonehearst was a teacher at Nevermore. In addition, Professor Orloff runs a support group for sentient body parts which Agnes DeMille sat in on. Afterwards, Orloff was confronted by the revived Isaac who took out the power source of his life support system and ate his brain, which Agnes secretly witnessed. Because of Professor Orloff's death, Sheriff Ritchie Santiago intimidated Barry Dort into letting the sheriff's department provide security for the upcoming Nevermore Gala.

Lloyd previously played Uncle Fester in 1991's The Addams Family and its 1993 sequel Addams Family Values.

=== Dr. Rachael Fairburn ===
Dr. Rachael Fairburn (portrayed by Thandiwe Newton) is the chief psychiatrist at Willow Hill Psychiatric Hospital. She allows Wednesday to visit Tyler Galpin in his specially secured cell. Later on, Dr. Fairburn had Laurel Gates transferred to Willow Hill to work on Tyler. It would later be revealed that Judi Spannegel is the true chief psychiatrist of Willow Hill with Fairburn being the puppet ruler and face of Willow Hill. When Uncle Fester caused a power outage and released all the inmates from their cells during his and Wednesday's confrontation with Spannegel, Dr. Fairburn grabs Augustus Stonehearst's wheelchair as they take refuge in her office. Both of them are killed by "Slurp" (Isaac Night) when he gets in.

=== Ron Kruger ===
Ron Kruger (portrayed by Anthony Michael Hall) is the scoutmaster of the Phoenix Cadets. Because Nevermore had rented the Jericho Campground that the Cadets intended to use due to a case of double-booking, Kruger agreed with Barry Dort to play a game of Capture The Flag to determine who would get use of the campsite for the weekend. Nevermore won the game thanks to unorthodox tactics used by Wednesday. The Phoenix Scouts tried to raid the Nevermore camp in reprisal which resulted in "Slurp" escaping and Kruger being killed by him.

=== Varicose ===
Varicose (portrayed by Liv Spencer) is Grandmama's butler and chauffeur who shares similar features to Lurch.

=== Rosaline Rotwood ===
Rosaline Rotwood (portrayed by Lady Gaga) is a psychic teacher at Nevermore during the 1960s. Her spirit was channeled by Wednesday in the Nevermore graveyard at Grandmama Frump's advice in order for her to grant Wednesday temporary sight to find the Galpins. Rotwood's ghost states that there is a price for that. Wednesday carried out the ritual as Grandmama had explained it; but when Enid grabbed Wednesday, they swapped bodies. Wednesday in Enid's body later made contact with Rotwood, who advised her to learn more about Enid before sunrise or they will both die.

=== Arnold Hunt ===
Arnold Hunt (portrayed by Casper Van Dien) is a soap opera actor who was later removed from the show and became a bartender at the Tiki Tails, a siren tiki bar in Morning Song, Florida that is frequented by Outcasts, where Gabrielle was one of the siren performers. He was later visited by Barry Dort, to whom Arnold talked to about his history. Dort came up with the idea of forming Morning Song, named after the location, consisting of gullible Outcasts and Normies. At some point, Arnold took up the alias of Gideon Sterling (after his soap opera character), ran Morning Song as Dort's front man, and became Gabrielle's husband and Bianca's stepfather. Gideon used Gabrielle's siren song to recruit people and steal their money. He groomed Bianca to take over for Gabrielle, but Bianca left the cult after realizing his true character.

By the events of season two, Bianca used her siren abilities to brainwash the FBI into raiding Sterling's compound, causing him to go on the run as Bianca tried to hide Gabrielle in places like the Apple Hollow Inn (where Gabrielle was discovered by the Sheriff's Department during their arrest of Uncle Fester) and an abandoned classroom at Nevermore (where Bianca and Gabrielle were found by Dort). When Arnold came to Nevermore, Dort reunited Arnold with his stepdaughter and mentioned to him that Gabrielle is in his apartment. Upon Arnold demanding his money from Dort, he incinerated Arnold in front of Bianca and threw his skeleton into the fireplace. The murder of Arnold was among the things that Bianca brainwashed Dort into confessing to at the Gala.
