= Svalbard in fiction =

Fictional mentions of the Norwegian archipelago

Novelists, screenwriters and filmmakers have set their works in Svalbard, an archipelago in the Arctic, the northernmost part of Norway yet closer to Greenland. Such works often make use of its Arctic climate, polar bears, isolation and the natural beauty of its dominant glaciers, mountains and fjords.

== Novels ==
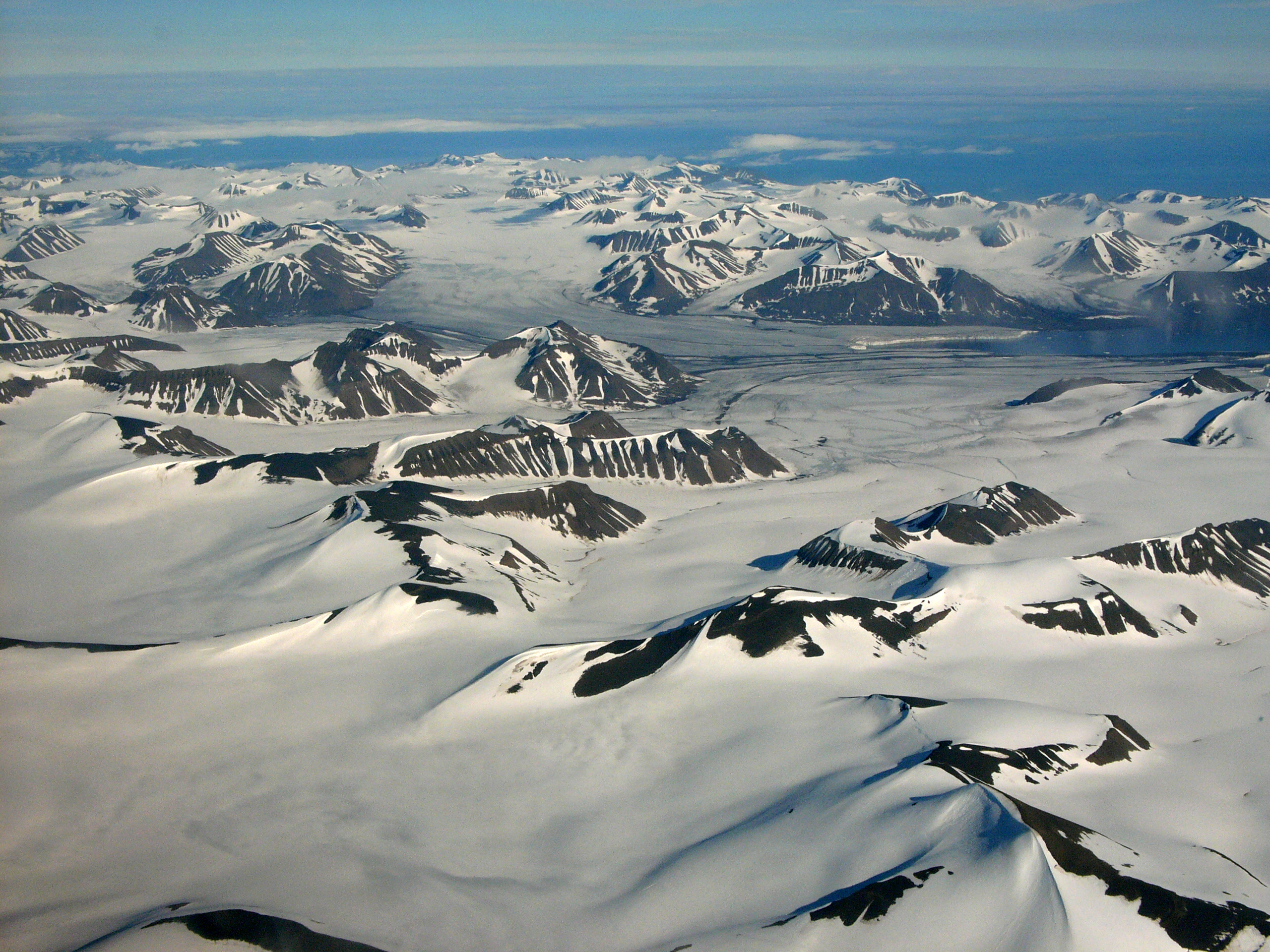
Spitsbergen, the largest island in the archipelago, during August

- The Midnight Library, by Matt Haig, features a woman who, in one of her many possible lives, is a glaciologist doing research in Svalbard.
- North of Danger, by Dale Hollerbach Fife, is a World War II story about a 12-year-old boy living in Svalbard who has to hide in a coal mine to avoid being captured by the Nazi invaders. The Commonwealth Club of California declared North of Danger as best juvenile book of 1978.
- Bear Island is a 1971 thriller novel by Scottish author Alistair MacLean about a movie crew who travels to Svalbard. When the group arrives, members of the crew start dying under unusual circumstances.
- Operation Fritham by crime writer and glaciologist Monica Kristensen tells the story of a small group of elderly World War II veterans who meet in Svalbard to commemorate Operation Fritham, a 1942 Free Norwegian forces operation to station forces there, killing, expelling or capturing the Nazi German meteorologists as the Nazis planned to operate the rich, easy-access coal mines. Unbeknown to them, one of their number is an impostor, a civilian murderer. The main character, who must unearth the imposter, is the head of the Svalbard police force.
- Dark Matter, by Michelle Paver, is a ghost story set in 1937 in an isolated bay on the north-east coast Svalbard. A trio of scientists land in locally taboo Gruhaken and get set to overwinter at the site of an abandoned miners' hut on the shore which they tear down. However, the journal writer finds someone — or something — else out is there as the nights draw in and he is left alone as one requires an operation.
- His Dark Materials, a trilogy by Philip Pullman, sets armed, talking polar bears here. The fantasy novels come together to form an epic comprising Northern Lights (1995, published as The Golden Compass in North America), The Subtle Knife (1997), and The Amber Spyglass (2000). It follows the coming-of-age of two children, Lyra Belacqua and Will Parry, as they wander through a series of parallel universes against a backdrop of epic events. The books have won various awards, most notably the 2001 Whitbread Book of the Year prize, won by The Amber Spyglass. Northern Lights won the Carnegie Medal for children's fiction in the UK in 1995. The trilogy as a whole took third place in the BBC's Big Read poll in 2003. The story involves fantasy elements such as witches and armoured polar bears, and alludes to a broad range of ideas from such fields as physics, philosophy, and theology.
- Neige Noire ("Black Snow") is a 1974 novel by Canadian author Hubert Aquin about a newly married Montreal couple who journey to Svalbard but a troubled husband whose quest to the north ties with his distorted worldview to murder. The Canadian Encyclopedia agrees with Chartier that it is "a modern version of Hamlet adding it integrates film, music and painting techniques into its sustained philosophical reflection on time, love, death and the sacred". The author admits he was tempted to use Repulse Bay and equally naturally inhospitable in winter settings he toyed with, but the string of fjords and mountains from Denmark suited his purpose better.
- The Svalbard Passage by Thomas Kirkwood is a tense thriller set in the US, Norway and Svalbard during the Cold War.
- The Solitude Of Thomas Cave, by Georgina Harding, is a novel about a sailor who bets his shipmates that he can overwinter in Svalbard. A review states that the "descriptions of scenery are outstanding" such as the language used to describe frozen streams" as "a temple of white streaks that weave out and back into one another like the boughs and twigs of a tree".
- The Reluctant Contact, by Stephen Burke, (Hodder & Stoughton) is a novel that takes place in Pyramiden, Svalbard in 1977, when the mine was still going and operated by the Russians. The engineer, Yuri, falls in love with a woman who plans to escape to the West.

== Films ==
Filmmaker Knut Erik Jensen made three short films about Svalbard: Svalbard in the World (1983), Cold World (1986) and My World (1987). This Svalbard trilogy has been called "an artistic peak" for him. The Norwegian film Orion's Belt (1985) (Orions belte was the original title) is set in Svalbard, based on Jon Michelet's 1977 novel of the same name. The film, which was directed by Ola Solum, includes beautiful depictions of the region's white icebergs and desolate mountain ranges. It was one of the two 1980s Norwegian films which "...found large audiences and made their mark internationally". The 1998 Belgian-Dutch-German movie When the Light Comes is set in Svalbard, and the 2019 animated film Klaus is set on a fictionalized version of Svalbard. The Italian film Quo Vado? is partially set and shot in Svalbard. James Gunn's Superman (2025 film) filmed in Svalbard, in the Adventdalen valley to shoot the Fortress of Solitude and its surrounding arctic regions.

== Television ==
The Sky Atlantic thriller Fortitude (2015) is a murder mystery set in a fictional version of Svalbard. It consists of 26 episodes over 3 seasons. The series was actually filmed in Reyðarfjörður, Eastern Iceland and the UK.

The animated series Pantheon (2022) features episodes that take place in Svalbard. As a science fiction project, it incorporates elements of advanced technology and artificial intelligence, with the events in Svalbard playing a crucial role in its narrative.

In the Apple TV series, Severance (2022–2025) the character of Eustice Huang is abruptly transferred to Svalbard to "work to steward global reforms" for the company.

In 2026, the third BBC series of Vigil is set in Svalbard, where the conflicting nations of the UK, China and Russia vie for control of a new discovery.

== Podcasts ==
"Found footage" horror podcast The White Vault takes place in Svalbard at the fictional Outpost Fristed (Norwegian for "sanctuary"), a mining outpost for the fictional Sidja Group, where a team is sent to repair an equipment malfunction.

== Anime ==
In the second saga of the Knights of the Zodiac, called the Asgard Saga, due to the description given of Asgard as an island above the arctic circle in the extreme north of Europe and of Nordic culture, Asgard would actually correspond to Svalbard. The author of this series used to put fictitious names to some real places, as he also did with the Phoenix Islands, Socotra, Jammu and Kashmir.

== Videogames ==
In Risk II, the sequel to the popular board game Risk, Svalbard is one of the new territories along with the Philippines, New Zealand, Nunavut, the Falkland Islands, and Hawaii. In the game, Svalbard is connected to Greenland and Scandinavia.

In the video game Capcom Vs. SNK 2, one of the stages takes place in Barentsburg. It is an ice-covered scene where an icebreaker is seen coming.

In the video game VALORANT, the episode 7 cinematic named ‘UNMADE’ featuring the Norwegian character Deadlock took place in Svalbard, in a fictional vault inspired by the seed vault.
