= His Dark Materials (disambiguation) =

His Dark Materials may refer to:

- His Dark Materials, fantasy novel trilogy by Philip Pullman
  - Northern Lights (Pullman novel), published as The Golden Compass in the United States, first novel in Pullman's trilogy, published in 1995
  - The Subtle Knife, second novel in Pullman's trilogy, published in 1997
  - The Amber Spyglass, third novel in Pullman's trilogy, published in 2000
- His Dark Materials (play), play adaptation by Nicholas Wright which premiered in 2003
- His Dark Materials (TV series), television series adaptation which premiered in 2019

== See also ==
- The Golden Compass (film), 2007 film adaptation of Northern Lights
- The Golden Compass (video game), 2007 video game adaptation of the novel
