= Mrs. Coulter =

- First appearance: Northern Lights
- Last appearance: La Belle Sauvage
- Created by: Philip Pullman
- Portrayed by: Nicole Kidman (film); Ruth Wilson (TV series)
- Voiced by: Erin Mathews (video game)

In-universe information
- Full name: Marisa Coulter (née Van Zee)
- Family: Madame Delamare (mother); Marcel Delamare (brother)
- Spouses: Mr Edward Coulter (husband; deceased); Lord Asriel (former lover; father of Lyra Belacqua)
- Children: Lyra Belacqua (biological daughter); Olivier Bonneville (biological son)
- Age: 35 through the main trilogy

Marisa Coulter (née Van Zee), known simply as Mrs. Coulter, is a character in Philip Pullman's His Dark Materials trilogy and one of the main antagonists of Northern Lights: the former lover of Lord Asriel and biological mother of Lyra Belacqua.

== Description ==
Mrs. Coulter is 35 years old in the third novel, The Amber Spyglass. She is described as being "beautiful and young" with "sleek black hair" that "framed her cheeks" and slim, though later accounts of her describe her as having blonde or "golden" hair. Such details of a character's physical appearances are uncommon in His Dark Materials. There is a reference in Lyra's Oxford to Mrs. Coulter having written an academic work called 'The Bronze Clocks of Benin'.

In the books, she is portrayed as an elegant and cool-minded sophisticate with social savoir faire, but she is also calculating, power-hungry and ruthless. She has political connections, and is highly placed and trusted in the Church's hierarchy, who give her a large degree of autonomy. She arranges for Iorek Byrnison, the heir to the throne of the armoured bears, to be exiled, and plots to dominate the new king, turning the bears into her subordinates. When Lyra is in danger in Bolvangar, her maternal instincts override her other loyalties and she rescues Lyra, although in the second book of the trilogy she still expresses no qualms about killing her to prevent the Fall. However, by the third book she finds herself torn, ultimately feigning loyalty to betray the Church and finally giving up her life to save Lyra. Metatron, the Regent of the Authority describes her character in "the most searching examination Marisa Coulter had ever undergone", stripping away "all shelter and deceit" and describing that he sees:

"Corruption and envy and lust for power. Cruelty and coldness. A vicious probing curiosity. Pure, poisonous, toxic malice. You have never from your earliest years shown a shred of compassion or sympathy or kindness without calculating how it would return to your advantage. You have tortured and killed without regret or hesitation; you have betrayed and intrigued and gloried in your treachery. You are a cess-pit of moral filth".

Despite this, Metatron describes her as lovelier than any wife he had, and he wishes to take her as his consort. This is her final deception as by this point she intends to betray Metatron to safeguard her daughter. She describes her self-perception to Asriel just prior to their joint sacrifice:

"I told him I was going to betray you, and betray Lyra, and he believed me because I was corrupt and full of wickedness. I wanted him to find no good in me and he didn't. There is none. But I love Lyra. Where did this love come from? I don't know; it came to me like a thief in the night, and now I love her so much my heart is bursting with it. All I could hope was that my crimes were so monstrous that the love was no bigger than a mustard seed in the shadow of them, and I wished I'd committed even greater ones to hide it more deeply still".

Mrs. Coulter's dæmon takes the form of a golden monkey with long fur, who is not named in the books, but was given the name "Ozymandias" in the radio adaptation. The golden monkey is shown to be capable of going much further from Mrs. Coulter than other dæmons are able to separate from their humans. How the golden monkey can go so far from Mrs. Coulter is not explained, Mrs. Coulter has not undergone any of the processes which enable other humans to achieve such separation. Her final act in the trilogy occurs when she is reconciled with Asriel, and they together drag Metatron into an endless abyss, the three thus ceasing to exist.

== Relationship with Lyra Belacqua ==
At the beginning of the book The Northern Lights Marisa Coulter seems to have a keen interest in Lyra. It is later revealed that Coulter is in fact Lyra's mother by her love affair with Lord Asriel (her title of "Mrs" comes from her marriage to Edward Coulter, who died before the events in the books.) In Northern Lights John Faa says that she fell in love with Asriel as soon as they met.

Although throughout most of the series Lyra hates and fears her mother, Mrs. Coulter repeatedly saves Lyra. Early in The Northern Lights, Mrs. Coulter saves Lyra from a group of child-snatchers known as the "Gobblers" by taking her out of Oxford, and nearing the end of The Northern Lights, she again saves Lyra from having her daemon cut away (a process known as intercision). A distraught Mrs. Coulter cries out for Lyra, who passes out. When Lyra suddenly opens her eyes again, she is lying in a soft, comfortable bed. Mrs. Coulter immediately assures Lyra that she is safe and, on her daughter's instruction, explains to her why children have to be intercised at such a young age, commenting on their "unhappy thoughts and feelings". Mrs. Coulter is ultimately forced to make a choice between Lyra and the church when it is revealed that Lyra is the new "Eve" whose death will be sought by the Church to prevent original sin re-entering the world. Coulter takes Lyra to a cave and keeps her drugged there at the beginning of The Amber Spyglass and ultimately saves Lyra at the end of The Subtle Knife.

== Adaptations ==
Nicole Kidman as Marisa Coulter in the film The Golden Compass.

- Emma Fielding played Mrs. Coulter in the BBC Radio 4 version of His Dark Materials.
- Alison Dowling played her in the Chivers Children's Audio Books version, which author Philip Pullman narrated.
- Patricia Hodge played Marisa Coulter in the first run of the National Theatre stage adaptation in London, and Lesley Manville played her in the second run.
- Nicole Kidman played Mrs. Coulter in the film adaptation, The Golden Compass. Pullman had previously indicated that he would like to see Kidman play the role. Kidman is blonde, though Pullman approved of the hair colour change made from the book's description, saying he regretted not making her blonde in the first place.
- Ruth Wilson plays Mrs. Coulter in the 2019 BBC television adaptation. Her dæmon was changed from a golden monkey to a golden snub-nosed monkey in order to better reflect the two sides of Coulter's character.

== See also ==
- List of His Dark Materials and The Book of Dust characters
- His Dark Materials
- Races and creatures in His Dark Materials
- Locations in His Dark Materials
