= His Dark Materials (play) =

2003 play by Nicholas Wright

- Original language: English
- Written by: Philip Pullman (novel); Nicholas Wright (play)

Premiere
- Date: 20 December 2003
- Place: Olivier Theatre; London
- Official website

His Dark Materials is a stage adaptation by British playwright Nicholas Wright, based on Philip Pullman fantasy trilogy of the same title. The production premiered in the Royal National Theatre's Olivier Theatre, London, in 2003. Due to the complications in staging a piece containing the narrative of three books, the play was performed in two parts in alternate performances. The play is published by Nick Hern Books.

== Premise ==
The play follows young Will Parry and Lyra Belacqua, and their adventures as they wander throughout parallel universes in a multiverse against a backdrop of epic events involving such beings as witches and armoured polar bears. The play deals with coming-of-age themes.

== Divergences from the source material ==
Among other changes is the removal of the character of Dr. Mary Malone, whose role in the story given to the witch Serafina Pekala. The eponymous amber spyglass of the third novel, associated with Malone, is largely absent.

== Productions ==
=== Original production ===
The original production was staged at the Olivier Theatre, National Theatre and ran from 20 December 2003 until 27 March 2004. The production was directed by Nicholas Hytner and featured the following cast:

- Pantalaimon – Samuel Barnett
- Lord Boreal – John Carlisle
- Will Parry – Dominic Cooper
- Serafina Pekkala – Niamh Cusack
- Lord Asriel – Timothy Dalton
- Farder Coram – Patrick Godfrey
- John Faa – Stephen Greif
- Billy Costa – Jamie Harding
- Mrs Coulter – Patricia Hodge
- Dr Cade – Akbar Kurtha
- Jopari/Iofur Raknison – Chris Larkin
- Tortured Witch/Harpy – Inika Leigh Wright
- Salcilia – Helena Lymbery
- Fra Pavel/Lee Scoresby – Tim McMullan
- Professor Hopcraft – Iain Mitchell
- Lyra Belacqua – Anna Maxwell Martin
- Macaw Lady – Helen Murton
- Stelmaria – Emily Mytton
- Ruta Skadi – Cecilia Noble
- Mrs Lonsdale – Katy Odey
- Thorold – Nick Sampson
- Iorek Byrnison – Dany Sapani
- Ben – Jason Thorpe
- Roger Parslow – Russell Tovey
- Perkins – Daniel Tuite
- Astronomy Scholar/Dr West – Andrew Westfield
- Brother Jasper – Ben Whishaw
- Angelica – Katie Wimpenny
- Golden Monkey – Ben Wright
- Tony Costa – Richard Youman

All other parts were played by members of the company.

The technical crew were as follows:

- Set Designer – Giles Cadle
- Costume Designer – Jon Morrell
- Puppet Designer – Michael Curry
- Lighting Designer – Paule Constable
- Video Projection Designer – Thomas Gray for The Gray Circle
- Computer Graphics Designer – Yuri Tanaka for The Gray Circle
- Choreographer/Associate Director – Aletta Collins
- Music Composer – Jonathan Dove
- Music Director – Steve Edis
- Fight Director – Terry King
- Sound Designer – Paul Groothuis

=== 2004 revival ===
The production was revived, again at the Olivier, National Theatre, in 2004. It opened on 20 November 2004 and ran until 2 April 2005. The production was again directed by Nicholas Hytner with Matt Wilde and featured the following cast:

- Serafina Pekkala – Adjoa Andoh
- Billy Costa – Mark Buchner
- Lord Boreal – John Carlisle
- Jessie – Michelle Dockery
- Mrs Lonsdale – Vanessa Earl
- Pantalaimon – Jamie Harding
- Roger Parslow – Darren Hart
- Iofur Raknison/Jeptha Jones – Don Gallagher
- John Faa – Ian Gelder
- Lord Asriel – David Harewood
- Golden Monkey – Leo Kay
- Farder Coram – David Killick
- Ben – Pascal Langdale
- Lilly – Samantha Lawson
- Brother Jasper/Kaisa – Elliot Levey
- Will Parry – Michael Legge
- Stelmaria – Emma Manton
- Mrs Coulter – Lesley Manville
- Professor Hopcraft – Iain Mitchell
- Salcilia – Victoria Moseley
- Daisy – Helen Murton
- Dr Cade – Chiké Okonkwo
- Tony Costa – Harry Peacock
- Lee Scoresby – Alan Perrin
- Iorek Byrnison – Alistair Petrie
- Dr West – Dodger Phillips
- Thorold/Balthamos – Samuel Roukin
- Fra Pavel – Nick Sampson
- Ruta Skadi/Betty – Rachel Sanders
- Lyra Belacqua – Elaine Symons

The technical crew remained largely the same as the original production with only the following changes/additions:

- Associate Lighting Designer – Vic Smerdon
- Music Director – Mark Bousie

In 2009 the Birmingham Repertory Theatre presented a new production directed by Rachel Kavanaugh before transferring to the West Yorkshire Playhouse and touring the UK.

== Awards and nominations ==
The production won two Laurence Olivier Awards in 2005 for Best Set Design for Giles Cadle and Best Lighting Design for Paule Constable.

== See also ==
- His Dark Materials
- The Golden Compass (film)
