= Locations in His Dark Materials =

Locations in the work by Philip Pullman

This article covers the fictional locations in the His Dark Materials trilogy and related works by Philip Pullman.

== Locations ==
=== Jordan College ===
Map with list of fictional colleges from Lyra's Oxford.

Jordan College is a fictional college. It exists in Oxford in a universe parallel to our own and is the home of the trilogy's young heroine, Lyra Belacqua.

The location and layout of Jordan College is analogous to the location of Exeter College, Philip Pullman's alma mater, at the University of Oxford. Unlike the fictional college, Exeter College is not the largest, richest, or oldest college at Oxford (it is the fourth-oldest).

Jordan College is an exaggerated version of the real Exeter College, rambling above and below ground in a motley arrangement of buildings, cellars and tunnels constructed over several centuries:

What was above ground was only a small fraction of the whole. Like some enormous fungus whose root-system extended over acres, Jordan (finding itself jostling for space above ground with St Michael's College on one side, Gabriel College on the other, and Bodley's Library behind) had begun, sometime in the Middle Age, to spread below the surface. Tunnels, shafts, vaults, cellars, staircases had so hollowed out the earth below Jordan and for some yards around it that there was almost as much air below ground as above; Jordan College stood on a sort of froth of stone.
(Pullman, Northern Lights)

The name 'Jordan' was inspired partly by the area of Oxford known as Jericho, through which the Oxford Canal passes; an area called 'Jericho' also features in Northern Lights as a mooring point for the Gyptians's boats.

The location of Jordan College used for the film, The Golden Compass, was Christ Church, Oxford. The location used for filming Jordan for the TV series was New College.

=== Trollesund ===
In Lyra's world, Trollesund is the main port of the country of Lapland, which Lyra and her Gyptian protectors visit during their journey to Bolvangar. Trollesund has a witch consulate, which the Gyptians go to in order to get support from the witches.

In Trollesund Lyra first meets Lee Scoresby, an aeronaut and prospector who has been stranded in the town as a result of a failed expedition, and Iorek Byrnison, an exiled armoured bear whom the townspeople had tricked into working for them as a metalworker with alcohol as payment. Both Lee and Iorek leave Trollesund with Lyra.

=== Svalbard ===
In Lyra's world, Svalbard is the location of the panserbjørne palace and the centre of the ice bear government, Iorek Byrnison lives there, Svalbard takes its name from a Norwegian archipelago in our world.

=== Bolvangar ===
In Lyra's world, the far north location of the research facility where the Magisterium conducts experiments with intercision, a process which involves severing the link between a human and their dæmon, children are kidnapped and brought to Bolvangar for this to happen. The name Bolvangar means 'Fields of Evil'. In Old Norse, "bǫl" means bale or evil and "vangar" is a plural word meaning fields or meadows.

=== Cittàgazze ===
Cittàgazze, sometimes abbreviated to Ci'gazze (Italian pronunciation: [tʃiˈɡaddze], meaning "City of the Magpies" in Italian), is a fictional city within a parallel universe which is reached through a "window-between-worlds" created by Lord Asriel at the climax of the first volume of the trilogy, Northern Lights.

It is in Cittàgazze that the two central characters, Lyra and Will, first meet in The Subtle Knife. The first reference to the city appears earlier, as 'the city in the sky', the city visible in the Aurora borealis, an occurrence which, according to the novel, thins the barrier between the universe in which Northern Lights takes place and the universe of Cittàgazze. Lord Boreal describes it as having previously been a crossroads between all the worlds.

Cittàgazze is a seaside town, reminiscent of those near the Mediterranean Sea, which seems to have Italian roots. Its main features are quaint restaurants, parasols hung over circular tables beneath trailing plants, wide cobbled roads, and ancient architecture. However, it also has electric lights, refrigerators and department stores, thus, this world appears to be similar to ours in many respects while inferior in others such as medicine and transport. Its most significant feature is the Torre degli Angeli (Tower of the Angels in Italian), in which the Subtle Knife is first encountered.

The city is plagued by ghostly beings called Spectres. Spectres are invisible to pre-adolescents, but once individuals are old enough to see them, the Spectres eat away their dæmons, leaving them zombie-like and lifeless. Hence, the city is entirely devoid of adults, and populated only by small gangs of children. Spectres cluster around children approaching adolescence and consume them as soon as they come of age.

The multitude of Spectres in the world of Cittàgazze is due to the constant use of the Subtle Knife in its vicinity. The knife can create windows between worlds, but each window creates new Spectres. Asriel's opening of the passage from his world to Cittàgazze caused a massive surge in Spectre population, swarming the Cittàgazze world with the soul-devouring spirits.

=== St Sophia's School and College ===
St Sophia's School is where Lyra goes to study the alethiometer after the events of The Amber Spyglass. She then goes on to study at St. Sophia's College.

== Worlds ==
The following are the known worlds in the Multiverse:

=== Lyra's world ===
The world in which Lyra and most of the characters in His Dark Materials come from. Northern Lights takes place entirely in this world. There are six known planets in this world and the month of April has an extra day.

=== Will's world ===
Our own world. It is the setting for much of the early part of The Subtle Knife and features briefly at the conclusion of The Amber Spyglass. It is the home of Will Parry, his parents Elaine and John Parry, Mary Malone, and several minor characters. While they still exist in this world, Dæmons are invisible here.

=== The Cittàgazze world ===
A modern Mediterranean world with beautiful seas and temperate weather. It is the setting for much of The Subtle Knife and parts of The Amber Spyglass. The Cittàgazze world serves as the crossroads to the worlds because all the windows lead here. The Spectres have been common in this world for generations.

=== Mulefa's world ===
A world inhabited by the Mulefa and Tualapi. It has a savanna/prairie climate. The creatures here have a diamond-like skeleton. It is the setting for much of The Amber Spyglass.

=== The Land of the Dead ===
The underworld in The Amber Spyglass. Within the books, anyone who has ever died from any world goes there eternally where their ghosts are guarded by harpies. The Authority turned this world into a hellish prison for all the dead where their spirits are crushed through despair. Otherwise, there is no heaven or hell for the dead. Lyra and Will used the Subtle Knife to enter this world and are carried across a lake to reach its gate by a ferryman reminiscent of Charon of mythology. Will was able to use the Knife again to cut open a portal for any of the ghost inhabitants to get out to the Mulefa's world, where they can dissipate away into the universe, for the price of telling a good true life story to Gracious Wings and her fellow harpies. This fulfils the second part of the witches' prophecy in that there is "an end of destiny".

=== Republic of Heaven ===
The name given to the world in which Lord Asriel builds his defensive basalt fortress and citadel with its adamant tower above a vast arsenal to prepare the armies and weapons to fight the war against The Authority. The land is mountainous and shows extensive signs of volcanic activity with only low scrub on the plains. Other than Asriel's forces, the only known large inhabitants are cliff ghasts, like those in Lyra's world, that have followed in via Asriel's interdimensional tear to feast on the dead from the battle ahead.

=== Gallivespian world ===
The Gallivespian characters come from this world, but the trilogy itself never goes there. It is a world inhabited by humans and Gallivespians who are in conflict.

=== Minor worlds ===
In this section are minor worlds that are featured in the books:

- Three worlds are briefly glimpsed when Will is experimenting with the knife in The Amber Spyglass:
  - One world contains a desert.
  - The second world contains an industrial city where the factory workers are in chains.
  - The third world contains a meadow inhabited by blue shaggy furred bison-sized grazing beasts.
- Will, Baruch, and Balthamos escape from the Regent Metatron by cutting through to a moonlit beach in yet another world.
- Will opens a world with a tropical rainforest when demonstrating the Subtle Knife's powers to Iorek Byrnison.
- While rescuing Lyra from Mrs Coulter's cave in the Himalaya of Lyra's world, he cuts through a world where the moon shines brightly over insect-infested ground the colour of bleached bone.
- Will, Lyra, Tialys, and Salmakia reach the World of the Dead from a world with what looks like a Dutch or Danish farmstead where the villagers have just been massacred by soldiers and their village razed — this conflict is never explained.
- When Will tries to break the subtle knife in The Amber Spyglass, he accidentally opens into a world where a rainstorm is happening.

== See also ==
- His Dark Materials
- List of His Dark Materials and The Book of Dust characters
- Races and creatures in His Dark Materials
- Northern Lights
- The Subtle Knife
- The Amber Spyglass
- Lyra's Oxford
- Once Upon a Time in the North
