= Will Parry (His Dark Materials) =

Fictional character by Philip Pullman

- First appearance: The Subtle Knife
- Last appearance: The Amber Spyglass
- Created by: Philip Pullman
- Portrayed by: Dominic Cooper (stage play); Amir Wilson (TV series)
- Voiced by: Steven Webb; Peter England; Daniel Anthony

In-universe information
- Family: John Parry (father); Elaine Parry (mother)
- Significant other: Lyra Belacqua
- Dæmon: Kirjava

Will Parry is one of the protagonists in Philip Pullman's trilogy His Dark Materials, along with Lyra Belacqua. He first appears in the series at the start of the second novel, The Subtle Knife, and continues through to the final book, The Amber Spyglass. Introduced as a 12-year-old boy, he meets and befriends Lyra in the world of Cittàgazze and teams up with her in order to uncover the mysteries of Dust and the disappearance of his father many years previously. He takes possession of the Subtle Knife which he uses to aid Lord Asriel in his bid to destroy the Authority.

== Description ==
Will is the only son of the explorer John Parry and Elaine Parry, a woman who suffers from mental health problems, and whom he has taken care of since he was young, due to her condition. Will is unable to remember his father, a former Royal Marine, who has not been heard of since he vanished on an expedition to the Arctic when Will was only a baby, and who we later learn has wandered into another world and is unable to find his way back. Will lives in Winchester with his mother and their cat Moxie.

Will is described as having straight black eyebrows, dark hair with a strong, jutting jaw. He is quite stocky and has a muscular build (for his age) and dark, fierce eyes into which most characters in the trilogy avoid looking directly. Although he is supposed to have dark hair, he can be seen on the cover of the US edition with fair, brown hair, and in the Spanish edition with reddish hair.

Will is quieter than Lyra, he is serious and courteous, he has a strong sense of morality (even paying for food and clothes taken from the empty city of Cittàgazze) and is very self-assured, always standing up for himself and his friends and refusing to be spoken down to. He demonstrates great bravery several times in the novels, though he dislikes fighting, and other characters often find him fierce and intimidating. Will is exceptionally independent for a child of his age.

== Dæmon ==
During Will's journey into the Land of the Dead in The Amber Spyglass, he is forced to separate from part of his soul. This turns out to be his dæmon, who had previously lived unseen inside him. As Will is still a child when this happens, his dæmon had not yet settled into one particular form. However, towards the end of the novel, his dæmon is touched (described as a very intimate and usually forbidden action) by Lyra and she settles as a large cat with lustrous and subtle-coloured fur. She is named Kirjava by the witch Serafina Pekkala ('Kirjava' means 'mottled' in Finnish).

Unusually, Kirjava has the ability to move far away from Will, much farther than dæmons normally can from their humans. It is this power that allows her and Pantalaimon to run away from Will and Lyra, having been rescued, in order to punish the children for abandoning them when they entered the Land of the Dead. During their absence, they travel through many worlds and though they return and reconcile with their humans, they agree to keep what they did and saw a secret until they feel the time is right to tell their humans.

== Role ==
=== The Subtle Knife ===
At the beginning of The Subtle Knife, Will is trying to discover the truth behind his father's disappearance and searches his house for a box of his mother's letters, which may contain a clue to his whereabouts. However, he is disturbed early in the morning by a group of government agents breaking into his house who are also searching for the same thing. Having found the letters, he flees but accidentally kills one of the men while doing so. He heads to Oxford so that he can talk to his father's lawyer and while looking for somewhere to sleep that night, he discovers an interdimensional window leading to the world of Cittàgazze. He explores the mysterious city and finds it completely empty of people – except for a girl about his own age called Lyra, who seems at first to be selfish and haughty. Will questions Lyra and soon realises that she is also from another world, one that is very different from his own. When Lyra learns that Will's world also has an Oxford in it, she decides to go there and speak to the physicists about Dust.

Will returns there with her the next day but is unable to learn much more about his father from either his solicitor or the local library. Upon reading his mother's letters, however, he discovers that his father disappeared when he was just a year old while exploring an 'anomaly' on an expedition in Alaska – this turns out to be a window to Cittàgazze, exactly like the one Will discovered himself. Shortly afterwards, Lyra's alethiometer (her truth-telling device) is stolen by Sir Charles Latrom in Oxford. Will goes back and confronts Sir Charles but is told he will only return the alethiometer in exchange for the Subtle Knife, located in the Torre degli Angeli, a stone tower in Cittàgazze. Sir Charles is unable to retrieve the knife himself due to the Spectres which infest Cittàgazze and feed on the consciousness of adults. Will and Lyra search the tower but are attacked by another man, an inhabitant of Cittàgazze, who wants the knife for himself. Together they overcome the assailant and win the knife but Will is badly wounded – the little and ring fingers of his left hand are cut off. Meeting the knife's original owner, he reveals to them that Will's injuries are the 'mark' of the subtle knife, which indicate that the knife must pass from him to Will, prompting him to spend some time instructing Will in the use of the knife before he encourages them to leave, intending to commit suicide so that the spectres cannot consume him.

As well as being able to cut through to other worlds, the Subtle Knife is also able to cut through any material or object in any of the worlds. Armed with it, Will and Lyra return to Sir Charles' house and steal back the alethiometer, narrowly evading Sir Charles and his guest, Marisa Coulter. However, the very next morning they are attacked by a group of Cittàgazze children who are furious at them for stealing the knife, led by the younger brother and sister of the man who tried to take it for himself. They flee from the city and are rescued by a group of witches from Lyra's world, led by Serafina Pekkala.

Lyra and Will, now escorted by the witches, continue their search for Will's father but are unknowingly being followed by Mrs Coulter and a troop of Spectres. One night, Will, unable to sleep, walks to the summit of the mountain they had been traversing where he encounters a mysterious man. The man realises that Will is the bearer of the Subtle Knife and instructs him to take it to Lord Asriel. However, just as Will recognises that the man is his father, the man is killed by a witch, bitter that he had once rejected her. Will captures the witch and berates her but she kills herself. He then returns to the camp, only to find that the witches have been attacked by Spectres and that Lyra has been captured. Two angels named Baruch and Balthamos, who had been following Will's father, appear to him, urging him to follow them to Lord Asriel.

=== The Amber Spyglass ===
With Lyra missing, Will refuses to take the Subtle Knife to Lord Asriel until he finds her. Baruch and Balthamos reluctantly agree and with their help, Will tracks her down to a cave in the Himalayas, back in her own world. Along the way he meets Lyra's old friend Iorek Byrnison, who is looking to migrate south due to the melting of the Arctic ice, and together they locate Lyra's cave where she is being kept in a drugged sleep by Mrs Coulter.

Will infiltrates the cave using the knife, but just as he prepares to pull Lyra out, the presence of Mrs Coulter reminds him of his sick mother and his concentration slips, causing the Subtle Knife to shatter. He collects the pieces and they manage to escape when Mrs Coulter is attacked by two of Lord Asriel's Gallivespian spies. The four of them make it safely to a window Will had opened previously and move into another world. Lyra then tells Will about a dream she had during her long sleep in which she talked to her old friend Roger (whom she accidentally led to his death at the end of Northern Lights), whose soul is now trapped in the World of the Dead. Will agrees to go there with her to try and save him, if he can get Iorek to fix the knife.

Will finds Iorek the next day and Iorek reluctantly agrees to help him mend the knife. With the knife repaired, Will and Lyra cut their way into the World of the Dead. However, as they approach the island where the souls of the deceased are imprisoned, they realise they must leave behind their dæmons if they are to enter. Will's dæmon, who lives inside him, is torn away, causing him terrible pain. Lyra finds Roger's ghost and apologises before Will cuts a window back out to the world, allowing the billions of souls to be released. However, from his father's ghost, Will learns that his and Lyra's dæmons are now in the world where Lord Asriel is waging war on the Authority. They cut back there and escape with the dæmons to another world, narrowly avoiding the attentions of the Spectres they are now vulnerable to. However, when they wake up the next morning, the dæmons have fled from them.

A group of highly developed animals approach them and carry them back to their village where Lyra's friend Mary Malone, a physicist from Will's world, is waiting among the Mulefa. They tell her about their adventures and in return Mary tells them about the time she first fell in love and how she stopped believing in God (she had previously been a nun). Will goes back out the next morning with Lyra to find their dæmons. When they stop to eat, Lyra feeds him a piece of fruit that was given to them by Mary (a reference to the Fall), and they realise that they have fallen in love with each other. Their love causes Dust, which is the source of human consciousness and free will, to stop escaping but instead to fall upon the world once more.

However, the very next day their dæmons return and tell them what they have learned. To preserve the existence of Dust, all of the windows between the worlds must be closed, and because dæmons can only live for a short time outside of their own worlds, Will and Lyra must each return to their own world. Will is also told that using the Subtle Knife had produced the Spectres initially and that it must therefore be destroyed: he can no longer use it to travel between worlds. Will realises that he and Lyra must separate forever.

Will, Lyra and Mary return to Cittàgazze and he cuts a window back into the Oxford of his world. Before they part, Lyra leads him to the University's Botanic Garden where she finds a certain bench, one that also exists in her world in the same place. They promise to return there, every year for the rest of their lives at noon on midsummer's day so they can feel close to one another again. Lyra steps back into Cittàgazze and Will seals the window behind her. Finally Will has to break the knife and he recalls how it had broken the first time, when he had thought of his mother. This time he thinks of Lyra and the knife shatters, as it is unable to cut through his love for her. He collects the pieces and leaves with Mary as the two discuss how to cover up their absence and best help his mother.

=== After the books ===
In the 2013 edition of The Amber Spyglass released in the UK, the post-script Lantern Slides section reveals that Will later becomes a medical student and eventually a doctor in his world. His time bearing the Subtle Knife has given him the gift of diagnosing patients, though he tries to hide this gift early in his studies as others would believe it to be supernatural.

== Adaptations ==
In the unabridged audio books, Will's role is read by Steven Webb in The Subtle Knife and by Peter England in The Amber Spyglass, while in the BBC's dramatisation he was played by Daniel Anthony. In the National Theatre's production of His Dark Materials in 2003, Will was portrayed by Dominic Cooper. In the BBC adaptation of His Dark Materials, he is portrayed by Amir Wilson.

== See also ==
- List of His Dark Materials and The Book of Dust characters
- Races and creatures in His Dark Materials
- Locations in His Dark Materials
