= The Subtle Knife =

1997 fantasy novel by Philip Pullman

- First edition
- Author: Philip Pullman
- Cover artist: Philip Pullman & David Scutt
- Series: His Dark Materials
- Release number: 2
- Genre: Fantasy novel
- Publisher: Scholastic Point
- Publication date: 22 July 1997
- Publication place: United Kingdom
- Media type: Print (hardback and paperback)
- Pages: 341
- ISBN: 0-590-54243-5
- OCLC: 44058512
- Preceded by: Northern Lights (The Golden Compass)
- Followed by: The Amber Spyglass

The Subtle Knife is a young-adult fantasy novel published in 1997 and the second book in Philip Pullman's His Dark Materials trilogy. The novel continues the adventures of Lyra Belacqua (now known as Lyra Silvertongue) recounted in the first novel, Northern Lights, as she investigates the mysterious phenomenon of Dust. Will Parry is introduced as a companion to Lyra, and together they explore new worlds in the search for Will's father.

In 2020, the novel formed the main part of the second series of the joint BBC-HBO television adaptation His Dark Materials. Parts of the novel had already been included in the first series in 2019.

== Setting ==
The main setting is a universe dominated by the Magisterium, an international theocracy which actively suppresses heresy. In Lyra's world, humans' souls naturally exist outside of their bodies in the form of sentient "dæmons" in animal form which accompany, aid, and comfort their humans. An important plot device is the alethiometer, a truth-telling symbol reader. By setting the alethiometer's hands to point to symbols around a dial a skilled practitioner can pose questions, which are answered by the movement round the dial of a further hand. The Subtle Knife of the book's title is a knife called Æsahættr, which can cut windows between worlds.

== Plot ==
Twelve-year-old Will Parry lives in Oxford, where he cares for his mother who has mental health problems. After accidentally killing an intruder, Will flees and stumbles on a window to another world. Seeking refuge from his pursuers, he enters and finds himself in the city of Cittàgazze where he meets Lyra and her dæmon Pantalaimon, who have arrived from her world via the opening in the sky created by her father, Lord Asriel (in Northern Lights).

Mrs Coulter, Lyra's mother, tortures a witch for a prophecy said to concern her daughter. Before the victim can reveal the details she is killed by the witch Serafina Pekkala. Realising Lyra's importance, Serafina Pekkala sets off in search of her. Meanwhile the aeronaut Lee Scoresby searches for Stanislaus Grumman, previously believed dead, who is rumoured to have knowledge of a powerful object that could protect Lyra.

Will returns to his world to seek information about his father, who went missing years earlier on an expedition. Lyra, who has come with him, wants to learn about Dust—mysterious particles connected to consciousness. On the advice of her alethiometer Lyra visits the physicist Dr Mary Malone, who has a computer that can communicate with dark matter. Lyra realises that dark matter seems to correspond with what she knows as Dust.

After accepting a lift from an elderly man introducing himself as Sir Charles Latrom, Lyra realises he has stolen her alethiometer. Sir Charles promises to return the instrument in return for a powerful knife that he covets, now in Cittàgazze. Will defeats a youth who has taken the knife from its holder, Giacomo Paradisi, but loses two fingers in the fight. Paradisi explains that this is a sign that Will is the knife's new bearer, and he explains its power: the ability to cut through any material, even the fabric between worlds. Will and Lyra learn that Cittàgazze is haunted by soul-eating spectres, which prey on adolescents and adults but ignore children.

Will uses the knife to cut a window into Sir Charles's home where he overhears a conversation with Mrs Coulter. Lyra realises that Sir Charles is Lord Boreal, originally from her own world, and Will hears news of his father, who had disappeared after discovering a window between the worlds. Will and Lyra escape back to Cittàgazze with the alethiometer and are rescued from marauding children by Serafina Pekkala. She attempts unsuccessfully to heal Will's injured hand.

Sir Charles visits Dr Malone and offers to fund her research if she will follow his directions. She refuses. At Lyra's suggestion, she uses her computer to communicate with the consciousness of dark matter. It instructs her to destroy the computer and to travel through the same window between worlds used by Will and Lyra, explaining that her role is to "play the serpent".

Lee Scoresby finds Grumman living as a shaman known to the people of that world as Jopari (a modified form of his English name John Parry): Will's father. Grumman has summoned Scoresby to take him to the bearer of the knife and to assist Lord Asriel, who is assembling an army to rebel against an ancient angel called the Authority. They set off in Scoresby's hot air balloon but are forced to land by soldiers of the Church. The soldiers attack, and Scoresby calls Serafina for help. She leaves Lyra to follow his call, but arrives too late. Scoresby has died holding off the soldiers so that Grumman can complete his task.

Mrs Coulter tricks Sir Charles into revealing the secret of the knife, and poisons him. She uses the spectres, which she has learned to control, to torture a witch into revealing the prophecy: that Lyra is the second Eve. Mrs Coulter plans to destroy her daughter rather than risk a second Fall.

Leaving Lyra asleep at their overnight camp, Will walks on alone and finds his father, who staunches his bleeding and tells him to join Lord Asriel's forces. Grumman is killed by a vengeful witch whose love he had once spurned. Will returns to find a pair of angels waiting to guide him to Asriel. He goes to awaken Lyra, but finds that she is missing and that her guardian witches' souls have been drained by spectres.

== Critical reception ==
The Subtle Knife won Parents' Choice Gold Book Award; American Library Association Best Book for Young Adults; Booklist Editors' Choice; Publishers Weekly Best Book of the Year; Horn Book Fanfare Honor Book; Bulletin Blue Ribbon Book; Book Links Best Book of the Year; and American Bookseller Pick of the Lists.

== Adaptations ==
Before the release of The Golden Compass (a film adaptation of the first book in the series) on 7 December 2007, New Line Cinema said that an adaptation of The Subtle Knife would go into production only if the first film was a success. The Golden Compass made over twice its budget worldwide but was a disappointment in the United States; this left the fate of its sequel unclear. The international rights were also originally sold to provide financing for the first film, thus amounting to a significant disappointment for New Line Cinema. Producer Deborah Forte, however, was adamant that she would finish the trilogy, saying, "I believe there are enough people who see what a viable and successful franchise we have." However, Philip Pullman later remarked at the British Humanist Association annual conference in 2011 that due to the first film's disappointing sales in the United States, there would not be any sequels made.

An audiobook adaptation, featuring a full cast and narration by the author, was released in 2000.

As the second novel of the His Dark Materials trilogy, the book has also formed part of a radio drama on BBC Radio 4, starring Terence Stamp as Lord Asriel and Lulu Popplewell as Lyra, and as a two-part, six-hour performance for London's Royal National Theatre in December 2003, running until March 2004, and starring Anna Maxwell Martin as Lyra, Dominic Cooper as Will, Timothy Dalton as Lord Asriel and Patricia Hodge as Mrs Coulter, and a second run between November 2004 and April 2005.

The second series of the joint BBC-HBO television adaptation of His Dark Materials, approved in September 2018, covers The Subtle Knife, with introductions to the book's central characters beginning in the first season.
