= Races and creatures in His Dark Materials =

His Dark Materials is a trilogy of fantasy novels by Philip Pullman consisting of Northern Lights (1995; published as The Golden Compass in North America), The Subtle Knife (1997), and The Amber Spyglass (2000). This is a list of the fictional races and creatures in the novels.

== Armoured bears (panserbjørne) ==
The panserbjørne are large polar bear-like creatures that have opposable thumbs on their front paws. Despite their large digits, they have dexterity, this, together with immense strength makes them gifted metalsmiths. They are capable of creating and repairing metal items beyond the capabilities of human smiths. While they mainly speak English, they are shown to be able to speak other languages.

Bears are very difficult to deceive. One exception is Iofur Raknison; the bear-king emulates humans by drinking spirits, wearing expensive clothes, and wanting a dæmon. His gullibility is attributed to his failing to act like a bear. Polar bears' livers are poisonous — a trait shared in real life with other polar mammals — due to a very high concentration of retinol (Vitamin A) to enable them to cope with the hostile Arctic environment.

The word "panserbjørne" means "armour-bears" in Danish. The Danish pronunciation of the word "panserbjørn" (singular) is [ˌpʰænˀsɐˈpjɶɐ̯n], but the pronunciation used in the radio plays and the audio book readings of the trilogy (by Pullman himself) is /ˈpænsərbjɜːrnə/. In the 2007 film The Golden Compass, they are also known as "ice bears".

=== Society ===
Panserbjørne are generally solitary creatures, but have a loose society centred on Svalbard. They are governed by a king; Iofur Raknison and Iorek Byrnison are the two kings who appear in the books.

Some bears occasionally hire themselves out to humans as mercenaries or labourers, but only in the Arctic regions, and it is implied that bears who do this may be shamed in some way. Lands further to the south have little contact with the bears, though their existence is widely known.

Becoming an outcast is the worst shame to a bear. The outcast is forced to leave his home and if he approaches Svalbard again, he will be shot down from afar with fire hurlers. Bears consider death by fire hurler to be dishonourable. The outcast may not participate in a legal duel, and any other bear may kill him without punishment or censure.

Duels are ceremonial occasions to bears, and they do not usually end in death. When a bear knows he will be defeated, he is obliged to signal his submission to the victor. On rare occasions, however, an issue may be so important that there is no other option than to kill one's rival. One such case is the duel between Iorek Byrnison and Iofur Raknison, which ends with Iofur's death and Iorek reclaiming the throne. Normally, an outcast like Iorek would not have been allowed to participate in a duel, but the then-king Iofur is tricked into making an exception. Ordinarily, a bear who kills another in a duel is made an outcast.

In the books the bears struggle to maintain their own culture and traditions against the intrusive effects of human society. This is most visible during the reign of Iofur Raknison, the usurper king of Svalbard for most of Northern Lights. Iofur tries to force the bears to become more human-like, to build palaces and universities, decorate their armour, and even acquire dæmons. Even the marble used to build the palace is offensive to the bears' way of life. Decorating armour is an even worse affront, because they think sky-iron (which seems to only be available at Svalbard) is the only thing armour should be made of. Iorek Byrnison defeats Iofur towards the end of the first book and returns the bears to their traditions. Later in the series, however, he begins to feel human feelings such as doubt, especially in connection to the Subtle Knife.

=== Armour and weapons ===
Armour is extremely important to the panserbjørne; they consider it the equivalent of a dæmon or soul, albeit one that they consciously make for themselves.

A bear fashions his own armour using 'sky-iron', a rare metal collected from meteorites which the bears discover on, or buried in, the ice. Although the magical metal described in Pullman's works is fictional, the native peoples of the Arctic do value meteorites (particularly the Cape York meteorite) as a source of iron for toolmaking. Sky-iron is described as being very durable, and has only been seen to be damaged by the Subtle Knife, which cuts through it with ease.

A bear's primary weapons are his immense strength, savage jaws, and razor-sharp claws. He uses these in close combat or when fighting duels with other bears. However, bears use fire hurlers, which are a combination of flame throwers and catapults, against human enemies and outcasts.

== Witches ==
In Lyra's world, witches are exclusively female and live in the far north. They worship their own gods and goddesses of nature and the earth; they also understand the Judeo-Christian concept of "Mother Eve". Every witch who appears is described as very beautiful, as they stay young for their entire lives, but attain a look of wisdom. Some witches live to be over 1,000 years old. They dress in ragged black silk and are always barefoot. Witch queens usually wear a crown that they have created for themselves. Serafina Pekkala wears a band of everlasting, red Arctic flowers and Ruta Skadi wears a tiara of Siberian tiger teeth. Their crowns (like their dæmons which are always birds) reflect the witch queen's personality.

Witches are renowned for their excellent marksmanship, and carry bows with them wherever they go. They lower their bows to the ground as a symbol of friendship when necessary.

Witches occasionally choose human men who are in some way exceptional to be their lovers. All of a witch's sons will be human and all of her daughters will be witches. To a witch, the lives of sons or lovers are mere instants. Although some regret losing those they love, they accept that they cannot change who they are. They are however wholly unable to forgive anyone whom they love, who does not reciprocate those feelings.

=== Powers and abilities ===
Witches can feel cold, but are not affected by it. They can endure the lowest temperatures on earth comfortably. Because they are not burdened by heavy clothing, they can feel the beams of the Aurora on their bare skin.

There is a wasteland far north where no dæmon can go. This is the result of an unknown catastrophe. If a girl manages to get through the wasteland, she then becomes a witch. Her dæmon is then able to go great distances from her without dying. Because all witch dæmons are birds, they can easily fly away to carry messages, spy, or do other tasks for their witches – often to the alarm of anyone who has never seen a person or dæmon separated from one another.

If a witch has a branch of a special cloud-pine tree, she can use it to fly. A human cannot fly this way, although a witch can carry another person up on their cloud-pine if they need to, but they usually lift no one bigger than a child. In large numbers, witches and their cloud-pines can tow an airship with no directional engine and have some control over the winds.

Witches, through intense concentration, have the power to be wholly ignored. In the right state of mind, a witch can make herself so unnoticeable that she is almost invisible. Although she is always completely solid, people will glance at her when they see her and move aside to let her pass, without any comment or objection, as if she were merely a part of the wall. Some witches have the power of prophecy, as they foresee the existence of, and identify Lyra as, the second Eve. They have spells and potions for healing, although seemingly only in the right environment and can also keep flowers fresh and prevent corpses from decaying until after a mourner has approached and seen the body. They are also shown to possess some limited form of telepathy, as demonstrated by Serafina Pekkala's ability to know Lee Scoresby's location by giving him one of her crown's flowers with which to invoke her when he is in danger and by her effect on Mary Malone's dreams to help her wake up gradually and accept her presence. Her dæmon is also shown to have the ability to unfasten padlocks with a combination of snow and his breath.

Witches have a legendary sense of direction and can remember the way to a distant place that they have been to only once before.

=== Clans ===
On his journeys through Lyra's world, John Parry (alias Stanislaus Grumman) catalogued 9 witch clans.

- The first and most northerly are the witches of Lake Enara, led by Serafina Pekkala.
- The Slavic witches of Lake Lubana are the most southerly, and are led by Ruta Skadi, who had been one of Lord Asriel's lovers.

The witch clans often warred amongst themselves. Some witches even helped the Magisterium at Bolvangar, though most switched sides when they learned the truth.

In the world Lord Asriel sets as his base for war, an altogether separate race of witches is shown to exist, which has both males and females, who live only as long as most humans.

== Angels ==
In the trilogy, angels were originally the result of condensing Dust, although it seems that other conscious beings can also become angels. They appear as nude winged humans with a light of no apparent source shining on them, and, like the witches, appear to be both young and old at the same time. Angels are arranged in a hierarchy, according to their level of power, which also determines how luminous they are; the low ranking angels cannot be seen by the naked eye during the day, and are seen best at half light. The only way for humans to see them clearly is when they are enveloped in smoke. Angels long for the feel of a body, which Mrs Coulter uses to her advantage in The Amber Spyglass.

The first, oldest, and most powerful angel was the Authority, worshipped as God. As the angel Balthamos tells Will Parry:

"The Authority, God, the Creator, the Lord, Jehovah, Yahweh, El, Adonai, The King, The Father, The Almighty – those were all names he gave himself. He was never the creator. He was an angel like ourselves – the first angel, true, the most powerful, but he was formed of Dust as we are, and Dust is only a name for what happens when matter begins to understand itself. Matter loves matter. It seeks to know more about itself, and Dust is formed. The first angels condensed out of Dust, and the Authority was the first of them all. He told those who came after him that he had created them, but it was a lie."

— Philip Pullman, The Amber Spyglass, Chapter Two, pages 31–32

== Arctic foxes ==
Seen in The Amber Spyglass, Arctic foxes are partially sapient and mischievous creatures. They can only understand the present tense, a trait which leads to much confusion when they eavesdrop on others.

An excerpt of Arctic fox dialogue: "Bear must go south! Swear! Witch is troubled! True! Swear! Promise!" This happened when the fox in question had overheard Iorek Byrnison and Serafina Pekkala's conversation about the migration of the armoured bears because of a situation similar to global warming, and the fox was trying to trade information for its life with a cliff ghast threatening to eat it.

== Gyptians ==
Gyptians are a fictional ethnic group in the universe inhabited by Lyra Belacqua; they are roughly analogous to Romani people. The name 'Gyptian', like 'gypsy', an exonym used by some to refer to Romani people, is derived from the word 'Egyptian'.

Gyptians are water-travellers, they live mainly aboard boats traversing the canals and rivers of 'Brytain'. The Gyptians' primary source of income appears to be through trading as they travel. Lyra describes them as "coming and going with the spring and autumn fairs". Gyptians are said to pride themselves on their ability at card games. John Faa's group of Gyptians come from – and have a 'home base' in – "Eastern Anglia", the counterpart in Lyra's world, of East Anglia in our world.

They are divided into large families, the heads of which make up the Gyptians' Council, which is ruled by John Faa, the King of the Western Gyptians, the Council also includes Farder Coram. Gyptians sometimes gather in a "byanroping (sometimes called a roping), a summons or muster of families". Their society, while widely dispersed geographically, is tightly knit. Gyptian children are extravagantly loved and looked after by other members if they stray. Their ethnic group is small enough for all Gyptians to know each other by name, yet large enough to gather 170 men to travel north on a rescue mission.

Gyptians have a distinctive physical appearance, which Lyra attempts to assume. They also have a distinctive accent and vocabulary containing "Fens-Dutch" words. The Gyptians' Dutch-ness also shows itself in their preference for drinking "jenniver" (Dutch jenever), in their Dutch names (Dirk Vries, Raymond van Gerrit, Ruud Koopman), and their use of Dutch terms such as "landloper". Landloper is an old Dutch word meaning "land-walker"; it is also a derogatory term meaning 'tramp', which the Gyptians use disparagingly to refer to someone who is not a Gyptian.

An additional source of inspiration for Pullman's creation of the Gyptians may have been the subculture of cargo narrowboat operators that grew up in the British Isles in the 18th century, in the period between the development of the canals and the emergence of the railways. The families of these operators were constantly on the move and their children were seldom educated outside the home, as a result, narrowboat people tended to be regarded with suspicion by landsmen.

Gyptians are an honourable people, and appear to owe debts to Lord Asriel for defeating a proposed Watercourse Bill in Parliament, amongst other things. When they are made aware of the excesses of the Church researchers at Bolvangar they do their best to stop them. Despite their honourable nature, they are sometimes perceived negatively by mainstream society. Although they trade fairly, they are described as partaking in "incessant smuggling and occasional feuds" in which they may kill other Gyptians. Non-gyptian teenagers, to whom Lyra talks, insinuate that Gyptians steal horses, and that they are unconcerned by the disappearance of a Gyptian child. At a party held by Mrs Coulter, Lyra states that Gyptians "take kids and sell 'em to Turks for slaves", although this is likely to be one of Lyra's inventions.

The Gyptians believe themselves to be "hit worse off than most" by the spate of child abductions in Northern Lights, and this may be what prompts them to collectively plan a rescue attempt. This could also be a result of Gyptians having little other recourse in society, as they are described as having little standing in law.

Some Gyptians and half-Gyptians, such as Bernie Johansen, take up employment on land, although it appears that these are a minority. Some hide their gyptian heritage while still reporting information back to the gyptian leaders.

Serafina Pekkala's witch clan, who are based at Lake Enara, share a friendship with the Gyptians. This friendship was born from the relationship between Serafina herself and Farder Coram: Farder Coram once saved Serafina's life, and became her lover and father of her son.

== Spectres ==
Spectres of Indifference, commonly shortened to Spectres are beings of spirit escaped from the void between universes. Most commonly, a Spectre is created from each new window between worlds opened by the Subtle Knife. They appear in the second and third volumes of the trilogy The Subtle Knife and The Amber Spyglass. Before such openings, there were fewer or no spectres.

Spectres feed upon the Dust that makes up a person's soul: their attack leaves a person in an immobile, zombie-like state, indifferent to all stimuli. They are invisible to and do not harm pre-adolescents, as Dust has not yet settled upon them. When travelling, all human groups in Cittàgazze are required by law to include a man and woman on horseback to flee and look after the young in the case of a Spectre attack. Spectres are normally not air-borne, so air travel over Cittàgazze is the only safe means for an adult to cross the city, which is infested with them, bereft of adults, and populated by gangs of children.

When the effects of a Spectre attack on a human are explained to Will, he hypothesises that they, or similar creatures, may also exist in his world and may cause mental illness. His opinion is informed by the case of his mother, who seems to be suffering from paranoia and other symptoms of a disorder similar to schizophrenia.

Spectres cannot be killed by any physical means, although numerous methods of countering their attacks exist. Angels can neutralise Spectres and ghosts are able to hold them in combat. Humans whose dæmons have been removed from them via intercision can pass them without being attacked and humans can repel them with the Subtle Knife. Stanislaus Grumman uses his skills as a shaman to control one and send it onto a church zeppelin to attack the pilot, causing the craft to crash. Mrs Coulter convinces a group of Spectres that following her commands would give them more access to prey and is thus able to control them, and is able to make them "forget that they were earthbound" (so that they can fly). Consequently, at the end of The Subtle Knife, Will and Lyra's guard of witches is taken by surprise and most have their Dust consumed by Spectres while flying.

During the final battle of The Amber Spyglass, Spectres fight against Lord Asriel's forces, cornering Lyra and Will's dæmons so as to eliminate the children who have been such thorns in Metatron's side, but are held back by the ghosts (including Lee Scoresby and John Parry) while the children and dæmons escape to the Mulefa world.

== Mulefa ==
Mulefa are members of a fictional species of sapient beings who inhabit a parallel Earth in the novel The Amber Spyglass. "Mulefa" is plural, the singular is "zalif" (which is pronounced subtly differently for a male or a female).

These elephant-like creatures evolved a distinct anatomy based on a diamond-framed skeleton without a spine: they have four legs, short horns, and a prehensile trunk that functionally takes the place of hands. Signing with the trunk is an integral part of Mulefa language. They form close-knit communities, one of the reasons for the closeness may be that – lacking hands – it usually requires two or more Mulefa trunks working together to accomplish complex tasks like tying knots.

A feature of the Mulefa is their use of large, disc-shaped seed pods from their world's enormous "seed-pod trees" in locomotion; the pods fit neatly onto a spur on their front and rear legs when each zalif has grown enough to use it. They propel themselves using their other two legs, like a cyclist without pedals. In their world, ancient lava flows, which solidified into smooth rivers of rock running across the land, serve as roads. The Mulefa have a symbiotic relationship with the seedpod trees – their use of the pods on the "roads" allows the pods' extremely hard exteriors to crack and the seeds to emerge. These are germinated by the Mulefa, allowing the seed-pod trees to reproduce. As the book notes, the three elements of seed-pod, spur, and rock formation enable the continued existence of the Mulefa.

Technologically, the Mulefa's civilization is reminiscent of humanity in the Stone Age. Mulefa live in wattle-and-daub villages and use simple tools – there is no evidence of any form of mechanisation in their world. They do not use metal for any purpose other than ornaments. Reference is made to their domestication of the grazer herds, their non-intrusive use of trees to make lacquer, and their distilling of acid from rocks. One of their few natural enemies are huge white birds called tualapi which regularly destroy settlements with chilling ferocity, and which the Mulefa have no real defence against (save retreating further inland). The Mulefa also appear to lack any sort of organised government; they appear to live in village groups with little or no contact between settlements. The Mulefa's less advanced technology may be due to their limited trunks – the versatility and dexterity of hands giving humans an advantage. The fact that their natural environment supplies them with everything they need may also preclude any need for further development.

By their own admission – to Mary Malone – Mulefa have much slower thought processes than humans, and do not easily visualise abstract concepts such as those in mathematics, or easily establish links and patterns. They do however have an extraordinary race memory, remembering all of their history starting from 33,000 years previously, which is when they first interacted with the wheel-pod trees, an event captured in a story that is their creation myth. The Mulefa see this event in a very positive light. The period of 33,000 years coincides with the time frame given in the books for the awakening of human consciousness in other worlds, as evidenced by Mary Malone's anthropological research regarding Dust. Mulefa are also able to see Dust directly without the aid of an instrument such as the amber spyglass. The oil from their pods allows them to "grow up", making them more self-aware and able to see Dust.

In the television series, there is no indication of the CGI creatures having diamond-form skeletons — they were modelled to a large degree on prehistoric mammals called Chalicotheres, with the addition of a short elephant-like trunk.

== Tualapi ==
The Tualapi are the only known species hostile to the Mulefa, destroying the Mulefa's villages and causing the loss of many seed-pods. They are described as large, white bird-like creatures, with a similar diamond-form skeleton whose wings look like ship sails from a distance. Tualapi are almost always seen in groups. Father Gomez, a human from Lyra's world who entered the Mulefa world, was able to repel a Tualapi attack after killing one of them with his rifle.

The Mulefa have no defence against Tualapi other than retreating inland during their attacks. Tualapi attacks generally result in the destruction of Mulefa habitats. Like most animals from the universe of Mulefa, their limbs are in a different position than those of our animals, with a single limb (in the Tualapi's case, a wing) at the front; a pair (legs) at the middle; and a single limb (again in the case of Tualapis, a wing) at the back. Although they are similar to birds, they do not fly. Instead, they use their wings as sails and rudders to navigate rivers, and emerge onto dry land when attacking the Mulefa.

Just after he killed the first Tualapi he met, Father Gomez watches the reaction of the survivors carefully and comes to the conclusion that the creatures know about death, pain, and fear, which means they can be controlled and used for greater tasks. Father Gomez manages to get control over the rest of the swarm and starts to use the Tualapi for transport, suggesting he managed to domesticate or enslave them.

The Tualapi are omitted from the television series.

== Gallivespians ==
Gallivespians are a humanoid species from another universe that appear in the third volume of the trilogy. They are no taller than the width of a man's hand, so, to make up for their small size, they have venomous spurs on the backs of their heels. These spurs can kill or cause intense pain and temporary paralysis. Their venom needs time to build up to full potency so it cannot be used frequently.

In the Gallivespian universe, "big people" (humans) serve the Authority and throughout history have been trying to exterminate the "little people", believing they are demonic. Because of this, most Gallivespians join with Lord Asriel against the Authority, and due to their size and proficiency at using tools capable of instant communication (called "lodestone resonators", which are described as using quantum entanglement), are most useful as spies. Gallivespians are proud and arrogant by nature, compensating for their small size with their massive egos. They seem to possess little subtlety, and they are good spies only due to their size.

Gallivespians use various carefully bred species of dragonflies for transport. They carry larvae of the species particular to their clan with them, which may be quickly cultivated into a fully grown dragonfly. Once grown and imprinted on their Gallivespian, the dragonflies are entirely obedient until death. Gallivespians themselves also have a very short life, living no more than about ten years, and dying in their prime.

In The Amber Spyglass, the two Gallivespians who feature prominently are the Chevalier Tialys and the Lady Salmakia. These two are initially sent to protect Lyra and Will and guide them to Lord Asriel. Lyra and Will have their own ideas, and the spies are powerless to force them into action as long as Will controls the Subtle Knife. Tialys and Salmakia eventually befriend and help Will and Lyra on their personal quest. The only two other named Gallivespians are Lord Roke, commander of the spies in Lord Asriel's Adamant Tower, the central fortress for the rebellion, and Madame Oxentiel, who succeeds to Lord Roke's position after his death.

The name Gallivespian echoes that of the gall wasp. The word gall means both an abnormal outgrowth and is a synonym for impudence or bile, whilst vespa is Latin for wasp. The name also recalls the protagonist of Gulliver's Travels, who encounters a world of tiny people.

== Cliff-ghasts and night-ghasts ==
Cliff-ghasts are the more prominent type of ghasts in His Dark Materials. Since many of the characters grow up in the same world as the cliff ghasts and may have encountered them before the start of the Northern Lights they know what these creatures are and consequently no character at any point explains them. Cliff-ghasts can fly, and are mortal. Lee Scoresby, who hates killing sentient creatures, has no apparent qualms about killing ghasts. They are scavengers and enjoy killing and taunting. In the play adaptation they are depicted as hooded and shrouded, though in the Northern Lights they are described as having flat heads, large, bulging eyes, and wide frog-like mouths. They give off a horrible stench.

Cliff-ghasts can speak, though they do not converse with any of the characters. They are heard twice: once overheard and once talking amongst themselves as they butcher an Arctic fox. They at first seem to have no clear grasp of honour or respect even for each other, but Ruta Skadi does stumble, whilst invisible, upon the oldest cliff-ghast of all, a blind patriarch referred to as "grandfather" by all the others who take care of him and feed him. They are at first apparently one of the magic elements unique to the world of the Northern Lights, but then appear in other worlds. When the great war begins, they are the only beings known not to take sides, merely waiting to feast on the casualties (although they predict the victory of Lord Asriel's forces). They also, for reasons never explained beyond that of their Grandfather's advanced age and memory, know of the Æsahættr, the Subtle Knife's existence long before any human or witch outside of Cittàgazze does, and recognise that Lord Asriel will need it in order to win the battle.

Night-ghasts are reminiscent of the nightmares of mythology, to whom bad dreams were attributed. The name "ghast" echoes "ghastly", which comes from an Old English root meaning "deathlike" or "terrifying".

== Deaths ==
Deaths are only featured near the middle of The Amber Spyglass. Much like a dæmon, they accompany a person throughout their life, serving to gently alert the person when it is their time to go to the underworld. Deaths are described as human-like in appearance, yet unnaturally quiet and able to blend into the background with uncanny ease. However, as most people do not wish to see their death, deaths are courteous enough to hide from their humans. Deaths are presented as caring yet stern creatures, showing no pity for a person's dæmon which must vanish upon death. Deaths are present in a physical form in some worlds, much as dæmons can be seen in Lyra's. Deaths can disappear in a similar manner to dæmons. In The Amber Spyglass a dead girl says that her death "went forever". Lyra is confronted with her death when she and Will enter the underworld in order to contact the ghost of Lyra's dead friend Roger.

== Ghosts ==
In the trilogy, all people have a ghost which lives on after they die, ghosts have vague forms resembling the person when alive. Unlike a dæmon which dissipates upon a person's death, the ghost is led away by their death and becomes trapped indefinitely in the Land of the Dead. Will and Lyra remedy this by causing all the ghosts to escape from the Land of the Dead. When they escape, they disintegrate and become disconnected atoms merging with the rest of the universe.

== Harpies ==
Harpies in His Dark Materials are portrayed as being similar in form to the harpies of myths, having human heads and breasts on bird-like torsos including wings. In His Dark Materials, they are the guardians of the Land of the Dead, harassing the ghosts without mercy. They appear to hunger for information and knowledge in the form of stories and appear to have the supernatural ability to know when they are being lied to and use their knowledge of this and other wrongful acts committed in life by their victims to torment them.

When in The Amber Spyglass where Lyra and Will open a portal from the Land of the Dead to allow the ghosts to escape, the Harpies are given the new task of guiding arriving ghosts to the portal. The Harpies are also entitled to question the ghosts, requiring them to tell the stories of their lives and any knowledge they have gained. They are entitled to deny ghosts guidance to the portal (potentially trapping them in the Land of the Dead for eternity) if they have "nothing of value" to tell (and are old enough to be expected to) or if they lie.

In the TV series, the Harpies are shown to have large bird-like bodies and reptilian faces.

== See also ==
- List of His Dark Materials and The Book of Dust characters
- Locations in His Dark Materials
