= List of His Dark Materials and The Book of Dust characters =

This is a list of characters from the two Philip Pullman trilogies His Dark Materials and The Book of Dust.

== Introduced in Northern Lights ==
=== Lyra Belacqua ===
Lyra Belacqua, later known as Lyra Silvertongue, is the central character of His Dark Materials and a key character in The Book of Dust. Together with her dæmon Pantalaimon, she is introduced in La Belle Sauvage, where she is being protected from the Magisterium. Initially, as a baby, by the nuns of the Priory of Saint Rosamund, and later she is brought up by the scholars of Jordan College. In Northern Lights, as she leaves Jordan in the company of her mother, Mrs Coulter, the Master of the college gives her an alethiometer, which allows her to find answers on any subject. Searching for a kidnapped friend of hers, she ends up travelling to the far north of her world, and then across the multiverse, where she plays a part in a cosmic war between forces led by an angel named The Authority and her father, Lord Asriel. Lyra is prophesied by the witches to play the part of Eve, bringing about a second fall; this is accomplished when she reaches maturity and starts attracting Dust, halting its loss from the multiverse.

By the events of Lyra's Oxford, Lyra is living in Jordan college and studying at St Sophie's. Pantalaimon has settled into the form of a pine marten. In The Secret Commonwealth, Lyra is 20 and an undergraduate.

In the unabridged audiobooks, Lyra is voiced by Joanna Wyatt. In the 2003 dramatisation by BBC Radio she is voiced by Lulu Popplewell. In the 2003 stage production at the Royal National Theatre, the character was portrayed by Anna Maxwell Martin. In the 2007 film adaptation The Golden Compass, she is played by Dakota Blue Richards, who also voiced her in the video game adaptation of the film. Between 2019 and 2022, Dafne Keen played the character in the His Dark Materials BBC television series.

=== Lord Asriel ===
Lord Asriel is a member of the English aristocracy and Lyra's father. His dæmon Stelmaria is a snow leopard.

Asriel had an affair with Marisa Coulter, a married woman, leading to Lyra's birth. Asriel kills Mrs Coulter's husband after he finds out, but is spared imprisonment because of laws allowing self and family defence. As a part of his punishment, he is barred from seeing Lyra, but he takes an interest in her raising, delivering her to Jordan College and visiting her. Lyra grows up believing Asriel to be her uncle rather than her father.

Asriel is described as being "a tall man with powerful shoulders, a fierce dark face, and eyes that seem to flash and glitter with savage laughter". Possessed of enormous determination and willpower, he is fierce in nature and commands great respect in both the political and academic spheres, being a military leader and a fellow of Jordan College. In Northern Lights, he is able to build a bridge to another world, where he assembles an army to oppose The Authority, an angel that claims to be God. Asriel dies alongside Mrs Coulter killing Metatron, the Authority's regent.

In the unabridged audiobooks, Lord Asriel is voiced by Sean Barrett; on stage in the UK's Royal National Theatre production, he was played by Timothy Dalton; in the 2003 BBC Radio dramatisation, he is voiced by Terence Stamp. In the film adaptation, he is played by Daniel Craig while Chris Edgerly voices him in the video game adaptation. James McAvoy plays the character in the His Dark Materials TV series.

=== Marisa Coulter ===
Marisa Coulter (ordinarily called Mrs Coulter in the books) is Lyra's mother and a powerful figure in the Magisterium, the governing organisation of the Church. She founds the League of St Alexander in La Belle Sauvage, and later heads the General Oblation Board, referred to colloquially as the Gobblers. Her dæmon is a golden-coloured monkey, who, in the books, is never named and only speaks once (he is called Ozymandias in the 2003 BBC Radio adaptations and in the subtitles for the 2019→2022 television series, and the character Malcolm Polstead notes in La Belle Sauvage that, "if that monkey had a name it might be 'Malice'").

She is cruel and merciless at times, stopping at nothing to obtain what she wants. She is deceptive, full of grace and beauty, and uses these qualities to get her way. However, when she finds her daughter in peril at Bolvangar, she experiences a sudden realisation of intense maternal love and a wish to care for Lyra which outweighs her previous loyalty to the Church, and thereafter she goes to great lengths to shield her from the events around her. She dies alongside Asriel while killing Metatron, the regent of the Authority.

In the unabridged audiobooks, Mrs Coulter is voiced by Alison Dowling; in the 2003 BBC Radio dramatisation she is voiced by Emma Fielding. In the film, The Golden Compass, she is played by Nicole Kidman, while Erin Matthews voices her in the video game adaptation. For the Royal National Theatre production in 2003, Patricia Hodge created the role. Ruth Wilson plays the character in the 2019→2022 television series.

=== Iorek Byrnison ===
Iorek Byrnison is an armoured bear and companion of Lyra's. Armoured bears, known as panserbjørne in Danish, are a race of polar bear-like creatures with human-level intelligence and opposable thumbs; they have no dæmons and consider their armour, which is made of meteoric iron, to be their soul.

Before the events of His Dark Materials, Iorek had met and befriended Lee Scoresby. At that time, Iorek was king of the armoured bears in Svalbard, but he was exiled after killing another bear in a fight. Normally, when a bear realises that they are outmatched, they will surrender, but Iorek's opponent had been drugged by Iofur Raknison, second in line for the throne, to prevent this. Following his exile, the humans of an Arctic port town deceived him by giving him spirits and stealing his armour while he was drunk. In Northern Lights, Lyra finds him in a destitute condition working in a scrap yard, kept docile with a ready supply of spirits. She uses her alethiometer to help him retrieve his armour. Following this, he helps Lyra, naming her Silvertongue. When Lyra ends up imprisoned by Iofur Raknison, she arranges a fight between Iorek and Iofur for the throne, which Iorek wins.

After the opening of a gate to Cittàgazze changes the climate of Svalbard, Iorek is forced to take his fellow armoured bears on a voyage down to the Himalayas, where he meets Will Parry. When Will breaks the Subtle Knife, Iorek is able to repair it without the aid of specialist equipment. He and a regiment of his subjects fight on Lord Asriel's side in the battle on the plains; as part of this he takes Lyra and Will to find their lost dæmons. At the end of The Amber Spyglass, it is revealed that he returns to Svalbard and reigns as king of the armoured bears.

In the unabridged audiobooks, Iorek is voiced by Sean Barrett, and in the 2003 BBC Radio dramatisation he is voiced by Steve Hodson. In the film, he is voiced by Ian McKellen while Nonso Anozie and Fred Tatasciore voice him in the video game adaptation, Anozie having been originally cast in the role before being replaced by McKellen for the film. Joe Tandberg voices and motion-captures Iorek in the television series.

=== John Faa ===
John Faa, sometimes known as Lord Faa, is the Lord of the western Gyptians. Despite his advancing age, he is a brave warrior, respected by all his followers, open to advice, and considerate of all. He is a good friend of the elderly Farder Coram. His dæmon is a black crow.

When the Oblation Board starts kidnapping children, he leads 170 of his men to save them. He is wounded in an ambush but carries out his mission successfully, retrieving the children Lyra helped rescue, and taking them back to England. Faa re-appears briefly at the conclusion of The Amber Spyglass when he and other Gyptians are briefly drawn into the world of the Mulefa to bring Lyra home before the worlds separate once again.

Douglas Blackwell voiced him in the audiobooks and in the 2003 BBC Radio dramatisation he is voiced by Shaun Dooley. In the film The Golden Compass, Faa is played by Jim Carter while Michael Gough voices him in the video game adaptation. Lucian Msamati plays the character in the His Dark Materials television series

=== Ma Costa ===
Ma Costa is a Gyptian woman whose son, Billy Costa, is abducted by the "Gobblers" early in Northern Lights. A year before the beginning of the book, Lyra and her friends had "hijacked" her family's boat and sailed it to Abingdon, the next town downriver. In spite of this, Ma Costa rescues Lyra and takes her to John Faa.

When Lyra is hiding with the Gyptians, she discovers that Ma Costa had in fact nursed her, when she was a baby. Ma Costa's dæmon is a hawk.

Jill Shilling voiced her in the audiobooks of Northern Lights and in the 2003 BBC Radio dramatisation she is voiced by Ann Beach. In the film The Golden Compass, Ma is played by Clare Higgins, while Anne-Marie Duff plays the character in the His Dark Materials TV series.

=== Bernie Johansen ===
A minor character whose dæmon has the rare quality of being the same gender as himself. Half-gyptian, he was tasked with watching Lyra for Lord Faa while working as a pastry chef at Jordan College.

=== Serafina Pekkala ===
Serafina Pekkala is a clan queen of the witches of Lake Enara who, along with her snow goose dæmon Kaisa, is closely associated with Lyra and her journey. She assists Lyra in her fight at Bolvangar and throughout His Dark Materials, travelling into other worlds and attempting to heal Will Parry. At the end of The Amber Spyglass, she names Will's dæmon, and encourages Will and Lyra's dæmons to return to them.

Serafina claims to be three hundred years old or more, although this is not considered old for witches. Before the events of La Belle Sauvage, Farder Coram saved her life from an attack by another witch's dæmon, and they became lovers. They had a son who died from a disease from the East.

Pullman claimed on the BBC World Service programme World Book Club in December 2005, that Serafina's name came from a Finnish telephone directory. In context, Pullman was teasing the audience, however the claim has since been repeated on several fan-sites. Later in the same programme and in a speech made in Dundee, he said that the name came from a list of politicians living in Copenhagen.

In the audiobooks, she is played by Susan Sheridan and in the 2003 BBC Radio dramatisation she is voiced by Tracy-Ann Oberman. In the 2003 Royal National Theatre production of His Dark Materials she is played by Niamh Cusack. In the film The Golden Compass, Serafina Pekkala is played by Eva Green while Hellena Taylor voices her in the video game adaptation. In the television series His Dark Materials, Ruta Gedmintas plays the character.

=== Lee Scoresby ===
Lee Scoresby is a skilled "aëronaut" (balloonist) from the country of Texas with an arctic hare dæmon named Hester.

Lee meets Iorek Byrnison in Once Upon a Time in the North when he is twenty-four. In Northern Lights, Lee is hired by John Faa and the Gyptians to aid in their mission to save the kidnapped children; following the rescue, he helps transport Lyra to Svalbard. In The Subtle Knife, he pledges to help the witches in their fight against the Magisterium and sets out to find Stanislaus Grumman. Grumman, also known as Jopari or John Parry, is a shaman and travels with Lee into the world of Cittàgazze. Lee gives his life fighting Magisterium soldiers, allowing John Parry to reach his goal.

Following their deaths, Lee and Parry fight Spectres after they are released from the Land of the Dead in The Amber Spyglass. After this task is done, Lee allows himself to dissolve so that his atoms can be mixed with the atoms of Hester and his other loved ones.

Philip Pullman said of Scoresby's name that "the Lee part comes from the actor Lee Van Cleef ... because I thought my Lee would look like him, and the Scoresby comes from William Scoresby, who was a real Arctic explorer."

In the audiobooks, Scoresby is played by Garrick Hagon, who also directed the productions., and in the 2003 BBC Radio dramatisation he is voiced by Peter Marinker. American actor Sam Elliott plays Lee Scoresby in the 2007 film The Golden Compass while James Horan voices him in the video game adaptation. Lin-Manuel Miranda plays the character in the His Dark Materials television series.

=== Iofur Raknison ===
Iofur Raknison is an armoured bear who wishes to be equal to a human. After usurping Iorek Byrnison as king of the armoured bears, he commands his subjects to build a palace of stone and wear ornamentation of gold and silver, which had been traditionally despised. He had dealings with the Magisterium and Mrs Coulter, allowing them access to his kingdom in exchange for the ability to be baptised as a Christian. Lyra is able to trick him into fighting Iorek Byrnison by convincing him that she is herself a dæmon and that she could become his dæmon. Traditionally, armoured bears are unable to be tricked but in his behaving like a human, he loses this ability; Iorek is able to exploit this by feigning injury. After Iofur's defeat, Iorek is proclaimed the king, and his first command is that the bears discard their pseudo-human trinkets and tear down Iofur's palace.

In the audiobook of Northern Lights, he is voiced by Douglas Blackwell and in the 2003 BBC Radio dramatisation he is voiced by Gerard McDermott. In the 2007 film adaptation, The Golden Compass, the character is renamed Ragnar Sturlusson to prevent confusion with Iorek Byrnison and is voiced by Ian McShane while JB Blanc voices him the video game adaptation. In the television series, Iofur is motion-captured by Joi Johannsson and voiced by Peter Serafinowicz.

=== Roger Parslow ===
Roger Parslow, a young kitchen boy and youngest of the Parslow family – who had long been employed as masons for Jordan College – was the best friend of Lyra Belacqua during her early life in Jordan College. Roger's dæmon, named Salcilia, often appears as a terrier.

Roger is kidnapped by the General Oblation Board ("the Gobblers") and taken to their experimental centre in Bolvangar. When Lyra arrives there he assists her in helping the children escape and goes on with her to see Lord Asriel in Svalbard. Asriel uses Roger to create a bridge between worlds by severing him from Salcilia, killing him in the process of channelling the energy from the severing to create the bridge.

In The Amber Spyglass, he appears trapped in the Land of the Dead. Lyra is eventually able to free him and all the other dead souls to merge with the Dust in the living worlds.

In the audiobooks, he is voiced by Susan Sheridan., and in the 2003 BBC Radio dramatisation he is voiced by Leagh Conwell. In the 2007 film The Golden Compass, Roger is played by Ben Walker and in the television series, Roger is played by Lewin Lloyd.

=== Lord Boreal ===
Lord Carlo Boreal, or Sir Charles Latrom, CBE as he is known as in Will Parry's world, serves as a minor character in Northern Lights, but is a main antagonist in The Subtle Knife. He is an old Englishman, appearing to be in his sixties. He normally wears pale suits and is described as smelling sweetly. His daemon is a snake.

Lord Boreal is first seen in Lyra Belacqua's world at the cocktail party of Mrs Coulter. He interacts shortly with Lyra. He is also mentioned just before Lord Asriel crosses the bridge to Cittàgazze in Northern Lights as having been Mrs Coulter's lover.

In The Subtle Knife, Boreal watches Lyra exploring a museum in Will's world and approaches her, appearing to be a kindly old man whose only interest in her is to discuss the skulls. Lyra remembers seeing him previously, but is unsure of his identity. Later, when Lyra is being chased by the men who are after John Parry's notes, Latrom is in a chauffeured limousine and offers her a lift, at which time he steals her alethiometer. Lord Boreal tells them that they must get the Subtle Knife for him from Cittàgazze and he will return the alethiometer. After retrieving the knife, Lyra and Will steal back the alethiometer by cutting through from Cittàgazze into Will's world directly within Boreal's study. During this, they overhear a conversation between Coulter and Boreal, where he explains how he was able to set up a life in that world. Later, Boreal attempts to learn what Mary Malone knows about Dust by offering to continue funding her and her colleague's work.

In a tent in the mountains of Cittàgazze, Mrs Coulter 'spikes' Boreal's drink in order to make him tell her about the Subtle Knife; he dies shortly thereafter from the poisoned drink.

Boreal's name means "northern" or "related to the north", as in aurora borealis. His pseudonym, Latrom, is "mortal" spelled backwards.

In the audiobooks, he is voiced by Stephen Thorne and in the 2003 BBC Radio dramatisation he is voiced by John Carlisle. In the 2007 final cut of The Golden Compass, Edward de Souza played the non-speaking role in a scene opposite Derek Jacobi and Christopher Lee, where is credited only as the Second High Councillor of the Magisterium. Ariyon Bakare plays this character in the TV series, in which the role is expanded, including that he is assigned to look for John Parry and enlists a pale-faced contact on Earth to help search for him while spying on Parry's family.

=== Farder Coram ===
Coram Van Texel is a gyptian with a large, unusually beautiful, golden-brown cat dæmon named Sophonax. His voice is described as "rich and musical, with as many tones in it as there were colours in his dæmon’s fur". By Northern Lights, he is known as Farder Coram and is a respected, elderly, adviser to the Gyptian King John Faa.

More than fifty years prior to the start of the trilogy, Coram travelled to the north, where he witnessed a witch, Serafina Pekkala, being attacked by another witch's dæmon. Farder Coram shot the rogue dæmon and rescued Serafina, thereafter they became lovers and had a son, who was killed in his youth by a disease from the east. After the son's death, Serafina Pekkala returned to her people as the clan-queen, and Coram returned to the Gyptians. In La Belle Sauvage, Coram is working for Oakley Street, a secret society opposing the influence of the Church. He obtains information about Mrs Coulter, fights Gerard Bonneville, and warns Malcolm Polstead of the upcoming flood.

He accompanies Lyra to Bolvangar to rescue the captured children and guides her in mastering the alethiometer.

Coram re-appears briefly at the conclusion of The Amber Spyglass when he and other Gyptians are drawn into the world of the Mulefa to meet Lyra and bring her home before the worlds separate once again.

'Farder' is possibly a dialect variant of 'Father', honouring his role as 'Elder' to the Gyptians.

Stephen Thorne provides his voice in the audiobooks, and in the 2003 BBC Radio dramatisation he is voiced by Kenneth Cranham. He is played by Tom Courtenay in the film The Golden Compass, in which his dæmon is a caracal. James Cosmo plays the character in the His Dark Materials television series.

=== The Master of Jordan College ===
The Master of Jordan heads Jordan College, part of Oxford University in Lyra's world. Helped by other Jordan College employees, he is raising the supposedly orphaned Lyra. His daemon is a raven.

In La Belle Sauvage, he offers scholastic refuge to Lyra. In Northern Lights, he tries unsuccessfully to poison Lord Asriel, hoping that it will protect Lyra and prevent conflict. In The Amber Spyglass, he offers Lyra a place to live at Jordan, and funding for her education.

In the audiobooks he is voiced by Stephen Thorne., and in the 2003 BBC Radio dramatisation he is voiced by Bill Paterson. In the film The Golden Compass, he is played by Jack Shepherd and by Michael Ensign in the video game adaptation. In the television adaptation, he is played by Clarke Peters.

=== Dame Hannah Relf ===
Dame Hannah Relf and her marmoset dæmon Jesper are scholars at St Sophia's college. In La Belle Sauvage, she is an alethiometrist and a member of Oakley Street, a secret society opposing the Magisterium. By the time of Northern Lights, she is the Mistress of St Sophia's college. In The Amber Spyglass, she invites Lyra to study at St Sophia's and to teach her how to read the alethiometer better.

== Introduced in The Subtle Knife ==
=== Will Parry ===
Will Parry is the bearer of the Subtle Knife and a point of view protagonist of The Subtle Knife and The Amber Spyglass. He is the son of John Parry, an explorer, and of Elaine Parry, a woman who suffers from mental health problems. Will does not remember his father, a former Royal Marine, who has not been heard of since he vanished on an expedition to the Arctic when Will was an infant. It is later revealed that John Parry has wandered into another world and is unable to find his way back. Will becomes the companion of, and ultimately falls in love with, Lyra Belacqua, and also becomes the bearer of the Subtle Knife by winning a fight, in which he loses two fingers on his left hand. At the end of the third book, he must leave Lyra Belacqua and live entirely in his own world, where he is taken care of by Mary Malone and his cat dæmon, Kirjava (which means 'mottled' in Finnish).

In the unabridged audiobooks, Will was voiced by Steven Webb for The Subtle Knife and by Peter England for The Amber Spyglass. In the 2003 BBC Radio dramatisation he is voiced by Daniel Anthony. In the TV series, he is played by Amir Wilson.

=== Dr Mary Malone ===
Dr Mary Malone is a physicist from Will's world investigating dark matter, which is equated with Dust, and is a point of view protagonist in The Subtle Knife and The Amber Spyglass. She is a former nun, and in the witches' prophecy involving Lyra, she plays the part of the serpent to Lyra's Eve.

In The Subtle Knife, Lyra meets her and tells her about her world's research into Dust, which Mary equates with dark matter and refers to as Shadows. Lyra demonstrates the use of her alethiometer, and Mary is able to program her dark matter detector to function similarly. The detector instructs her to go through the window into Cittàgazze, which she does, eventually arriving at the world of the Mulefa. There she builds the titular Amber Spyglass, allowing her to see Dust, and investigates the death of the trees that are essential to the Mulefa's environment. She discovers that the Dust is no longer falling from the sky to pollinate the trees, but is instead flowing sideways, leaving the flowers of the seed-pod trees unpolinated. When Lyra arrives, a conversation with Mary begins to inspire in her a sexual awakening, leading to her dæmon's shape settling and to her beginning to attract Dust; this action is enough to arrest the loss of Dust and to save the trees, and as such she fulfils the prophecy.

At the end of The Amber Spyglass, Serafina Pekkala reveals to Mary both how to see her dæmon and also its form – that of an alpine chough. She offers to help Will upon their return to their own world.

In the audiobooks, she is played by Kate Lock, and in the 2003 BBC Radio dramatisation she is voiced by Brid Brennan. In the television series, she is introduced in the second series of 2020 and played by Simone Kirby. [In Nicholas Wright's stage adaptation of the novels, due to the difficulty of representing Mulefa onstage, the character of Mary Malone does not appear. The role of the serpent / tempter was given to Serafina Pekkala, who was also the bearer of the spyglass, which had been created by Jopari (John Parry) as a device to view Dust.]

=== Tullio ===
Tullio is a teenage boy who lives in Cittàgazze. He is the owner of the Subtle Knife until he loses it fighting Will Parry who loses two fingers. Tullio is later attacked by the Spectres and his soul is eaten.

In the TV series, Tullio is played by Lewis MacDougall.

=== Angelica and Paolo ===
Angelica and Paolo are a brother and sister who live in Cittàgazze and are the younger siblings of Tullio. They were separated from their parents when the Spectres first appeared. After Tullio is killed by the Spectres, they lead other children in an attack on Lyra and Will in order to avenge Tullio but are repelled by the Witches.

In The Amber Spyglass, Angelica and Paolo encounter Mary Malone during which they tell her about their encounter with Lyra and Will how they still blame them for Tullio's death.

In the TV series, Angelica is played by Bella Ramsey while Paolo was changed to Paola and is played by Ella Schrey-Yeats.

=== Giacomo Paradisi ===
Giacomo Paradisi is an old man who lives in Cittàgazze and is a member of the Guild of the Torre degli Angeli. He was the bearer of the Subtle Knife and wears gloves to hide the fact that he has fingers missing as a result. Tullio had stolen the Subtle Knife from Giacomo before fighting Will over it. Giacomo declares Will to be the new bearer of the Subtle Knife. He later takes poison to prevent the Spectres preying on him.

In the 2003 BBC Radio dramatisation he is voiced by Richard Johnson and in the 2020 television series, Giacomo Paradisi is played in a special guest appearance in one episode by Terence Stamp, who had previously portrayed Lord Asriel in the 2003 BBC Radio dramatisation.

=== John Parry ===
Colonel John Parry, also known as Dr Stanislaus Grumman and Jopari, is the father of Will Parry and the husband of Elaine Parry.

Prior to the start of the trilogy, John Parry had been a famous English explorer and an officer of the Royal Marines in Will's world. When Will was a small child, John went on an archaeological exploration of Alaska, hoping to find a portal to a different world. He eventually found it during a blizzard, entering the world of Cittàgazze, where his two companions were killed by the Spectres. He continued his travels, arriving in the home world of Lyra Belacqua. There he met his dæmon Sayan Kötör, an osprey, and was found by a local tribe who called him Jopari, as a mishearing of "John Parry". He joined the Yenisei tribe and underwent trepanation of his skull, becoming a shaman of the tribe. Under the assumed name of Stanislaus Grumman, he attended the Berlin Academy, becoming a well-known explorer, and studied Dust. He spurned the love of the witch Juta Kamainen because of his continued love for his wife and family to whom he could not return.

In The Subtle Knife, Lee Scoresby is sent to find Grumman. He eventually finds him among the Yenisei tribe, although Grumman claims that it was he who called Lee to find him. Lee takes Grumman to Cittàgazze as Grumman wishes to find the bearer of the Æsahættr ("God-destroyer" in Old Norse). Grumman finds the bearer, Will, on top of a mountain and fights with him after Will attacks him in the darkness. Grumman uses some bloodmoss (a lichen used to stop bleeding) to heal Will's wound, and informs him of the role of the bearer of the knife. Immediately after the light allows him and Will to see each other's faces and realise their relation, he is killed by an arrow shot by Juta Kamainen.

In The Amber Spyglass after their deaths, he and Lee Scoresby are amongst those set free by Lyra and Will from the world of the Dead. Instead of immediately dissolving into the universe like the other dead, they both remain as ghosts intact long enough to fight in the battle against the angels of the Authority.

Julian Glover provides his voice in the audiobooks of The Subtle Knife, and James Greene in The Amber Spyglass. In the 2003 BBC Radio dramatisation he is voiced by Jack Klaff credited to the role of Stanislaus Grumman. In the television series, Parry is played by Andrew Scott.

=== Balthamos and Baruch ===
Balthamos and his partner Baruch are both angels in rebellion from the Kingdom of Heaven. They seek to become part of Lord Asriel's army of angels and overthrow Metatron, the acting Regent of The Authority. Balthamos is sarcastic, and his relations with Will are conducted with an air of ironic contempt. When he was human, Baruch was brother to Enoch, who later became the angel Metatron.

Both angels find Will Parry at the end of The Subtle Knife; because Will is the bearer of the subtle knife, they hope to take him to Lord Asriel. However, Will's companion Lyra Belacqua has been kidnapped and Will refuses to go to Asriel until Lyra is found. The angels agree to accompany Will until she is found. Baruch is killed while taking important information to Lord Asriel in The Amber Spyglass, and Balthamos, stricken with grief, promises to aid Will in every way possible to honour Baruch's sacrifice. When Balthamos is unable to do so, he runs away, grieving over Baruch's death and feeling guilty about abandoning Will. At the end of the book, Balthamos confronts and kills Father Gomez, an assassin hoping to kill Lyra, and dies himself from the bites of Gomez' dæmon ending the confrontation in a mutual kill.

As angels of low rank, Balthamos and Baruch's abilities are limited. They appear as luminous, almost transparent humanlike forms, which are barely visible to human eyes even at night. The angels also possess the power to transform, which Balthamos uses to masquerade as Will's dæmon when travelling in Lyra's world. They are capable of flight though their wings do not have a corporeal form.

In Arabic-Christian legends, the name Baruch is identified with Zoroaster. The prophecy of the birth of Jesus from a virgin, and of his adoration by the Magi, is also ascribed to this Baruch.

In the 2001 audiobook of The Amber Spyglass, Balthamos is played by Alec McCowan and Baruch is played by Nigel Carrington. In the 2003 BBC Radio dramatisation, they are voiced by Ray Fearon and Steve Toussaint. Fearon also acts as the narrator of the entire series. Fearon went on to portray the role of Will Parry's school boxing coach and mentor, Mr Hanway — created specifically for the adaptation — in the 2019→2022 television series, with Balthamos and Baruch being played by Kobna Holdbrook-Smith and Simon Harrison.

=== Chevalier Tialys and Lady Salmakia ===
The Chevalier Tialys and The Lady Salmakia are Gallivespians, spies, and companions of Lyra and Will. Gallivespians are a race of small humanoid beings about as tall as the length of a human hand from a world where humans, tending to side with the Church, are at war with them, and they serve as spies in Lord Asriel's army. Tialys and Salmakia in particular spy on the Magisterium in Lyra's world, and when the Magisterium sends soldiers to capture and kill Lyra, they are ordered to stow away and follow them. Gallivespians have poison spurs on their feet that can incapacitate a human, and they ride specially bred dragonflies. Although this poison can incapacitate a human, the more it is used the weaker it becomes, and it needs time to regain its strength.

They first encounter the children when, along with Lord Asriel's forces, they arrive at Mrs Coulter's cave, under orders to take the children to Lord Asriel. The Gallivespians are forced to go with Lyra and Will when it becomes apparent that they will not go directly to Lord Asriel willingly. They travel together to the land of the dead, helping bargain with the harpies.

Tialys dies when attacking a cliff-ghast, having dug his spurs deep into her neck. Lady Salmakia dies shortly thereafter, her short lifespan having reached its natural end.

In the TV series, Salmakia is played by Sian Clifford while Tialys does not appear. In the audiobooks of The Amber Spyglass, Tialys and Salmakia are played by David Timson and Denica Fairman respectively. Timson reprised his role in the 2003 BBC Radio drama opposite Joanna Monro.

=== Ruta Skadi ===
Ruta Skadi is the Latvian witch queen, and a lover of Lord Asriel. Her dæmon is a bluethroat named Sergi. She is 416 years old in The Subtle Knife, and makes appearances in The Subtle Knife and The Amber Spyglass. Her second name, "Skadi", is also that of a Nordic winter goddess.

She accompanies Serafina Pekkala and her companions on part of their journey. She leaves, first to see the angels up above her, and she wants to help them because Lord Asriel is with them. She brings news of a mysterious weapon which turns out to be the Subtle Knife after overhearing tell of it from cliff ghasts. She is described as being very passionate, powerful, pitiless and beautiful, and has black hair and large black eyes. She wears a crown made of the teeth of tigers she killed when a tribe that worshipped them offended her. When it is revealed to the witches that Lyra, Lord Asriel and Marisa Coulter's daughter, is to become the second Eve, Ruta laments that as Asriel's lover, she did not become Lyra's mother, reflecting on what Lyra would have been like as a witch.

In the stage adaptation, she kills herself after killing John Parry, who had, in the past, rejected her as a lover. In the book, this is done by a more minor character (Juta Kamainen) who does not appear in the adaptation.

In the television adaptation, Ruta Skadi is played by Jade Anouka. In the audiobooks of The Subtle Knife, she is voiced by Eve Karpf. In the 2003 BBC Radio adaptation, she is played by Joanna Kanska.

=== Father Gomez ===
Father Luis Gomez is a priest whose dæmon is a green-backed beetle. He was sent by the Magisterium to assassinate Lyra. The Angel Balthamos kills Gomez before he can reach her ending the confrontation in a mutual kill. His corpse is taken by lizard-like scavengers.

He is played by Jamie Ward in the television series. In the audiobooks of The Amber Spyglass, he is played by Andrew Branch. In the 2003 BBC Radio adaptation, he is not credited

=== Fra Pavel ===
Fra Pavel Rašek is a representative and alethiometrist of the Consistorial Court of Discipline. He is said to be a thorough but sluggish reader of the truth, requiring weeks or months to take an accurate reading. He was, however, successful in obtaining information useful to the Consistorial Court in a relatively short period of time, according to Marisa Coulter. He appears to be uncomfortable when voicing potentially heretical discoveries. His dæmon takes the form of a frog.

He appears in the 2007 film, where he is played by Simon McBurney while Alan Shearman voices him in the video game adaptation. In the TV series, he is played by Frank Bourke. In the audiobooks of The Subtle Knife he is played by Hayward Morse and in The Amber Spyglass by Nigel Anthony. In the 2003 BBC Radio adaptation, he is played by Stuart Fox.

== Introduced in The Amber Spyglass ==
=== Ama ===
Ama is a girl who Mrs Coulter befriended. At the time when Mrs Coulter was in hiding with an unconscious Lyra, Ama brought different supplies to Mrs Coulter.

In the 2003 BBC Radio adaptation, Ama is played by Jasmine Hyde. In the television series, Ama is played by Amber Fitzgerald-Woolfe. Because Fitzgerald-Woolfe is deaf, Ama was adapted to be a deaf girl who speaks in sign language. Mrs Coulter and Balthamos were shown to be adept in sign language when they each speak to her.

=== Atal ===
Atal is a Mulefa who befriended Mary Malone.

In the 2003 BBC Radio adaptation, Atal is played by Laura Doddington. She is voiced by Kate Ashfield in the TV series.

=== Hugh MacPhail ===
Hugh MacPhail is a Magisterium official. He is the Father President of the Consistorial Court of Discipline. His dæmon is a lizard.

In the television series, Hugh MacPhail is played by Dafne Keen's father Will Keen. His role was considerably expanded in this television adaptation, where Mrs Coulter and Lord Boreal answer to him, and in which his dæmon is named Octavia.

=== Metatron ===
Metatron serves as the Regent of Heaven and is the main antagonist of His Dark Materials. Metatron seeks to supplant the Authority, to destroy Lord Asriel and his army, and to kill the heroine Lyra Belacqua. He has immense personal power, and is shown as descending from the sky at one point to demolish a large area of land. He is betrayed by Mrs Coulter, who promises herself to him as a prize for his victory over Lord Asriel. Coulter is conspiring with Asriel to destroy him; the two sacrifice their lives to drag Metatron into an abyss between the universes to ensure that he can never threaten Lyra again. He is said to have been the Biblical character Enoch, who is in the line between Adam and Noah. He appears only in The Amber Spyglass. The name Metatron is that of a medieval Judaic Archangel.

Metatron is portrayed by Alex Hassell in the TV series. In the audiobooks of The Amber Spyglass, Metatron is voiced by Stephen Greif. In the 2003 BBC Radio adaptation, he is played by Philip Madoc.

=== Ogunwe ===
Ogunwe is an African king who becomes one of the commanders of Lord Asriel's forces. His dæmon takes the form of a cheetah.

In the 2003 BBC Radio adaptation, King Ogunwe he is played by Burt Caesar. In the BBC television series, Cmdr Ogunwe is played by Adewale Akinnuoye-Agbaje in which he is a military commander — in rebellion against his world's "Temple" that parallels the Magisterium of Lyra's world — who was sprung from prison by Asriel and his Gallivespian allies. Along with his compatriots, he has no external dæmon as evinced by his initial disconcerted reaction by the appearance and actions of the dæmon Stelmaria with Asriel.

=== Roke ===
Roke is a Gallivespian lord who serves as Lord Asriel's spy and one of his commanders.

In the 2003 BBC Radio adaptation, Lord Roke is played by Adrian Scarborough. Roke is played by Jonathan Aris in the TV series, in which he is just a commander.

=== Gracious Wings ===
Gracious Wings, previously called No-Name, is chief of the harpies in the Authority's employment in the Land of the Dead. Before Lyra and Will came, she and the other harpies tormented the ghosts with all the mistakes made by those ghosts when they were alive. At first, she is ready to attack Lyra and Will but later confesses that the wickedness of the ghosts was the only nourishment given to her and the other harpies by the Authority. The Chevalier Tialys and the Lady Salmakia bargain with her that instead of wickedness, the ghosts will tell the harpies true stories from their lives and in exchange will be taken by the harpies to the window Will has opened into the world of the mulefa where the ghosts may peacefully dissolve into particles in the air. The harpies agree to this as, along with the nourishment such stories would provide, they would also keep their honour by performing a useful and respected task. After she saves Lyra's life by stopping her from falling, Lyra names her Gracious Wings.

Gracious Wings and her fellow harpies are voiced by Emma Tate in the TV series. In the audiobooks of The Amber Spyglass, she is voiced by Jill Shilling. In the 2003 BBC Radio adaptation, she is played by Adjoa Andoh.

=== The Authority ===
The Authority was the first angel to come into existence; he and the angels which formed after him condensed from the substance known as Dust. He led other angels, and later humanity, to believe that he was in fact the creator of the multiverse: God. This claim legitimised his taking political power in the Kingdom of Heaven.

The angel Xaphania later found out the truth about him, whereupon he banished her from the Kingdom (a reference to the legend of the fall of Lucifer). Xaphania and some other angels later started a rebellion against him. The Authority was known by several names, including "Yahweh", the "Lord", "El", "Adonai", and "the Almighty".

He ruled his various churches, organisations, and universes from the Clouded Mountain, a floating mobile city believed by many in that universe to be Heaven. As the Authority grew older and weaker, the Mountain became more and more obscured by clouds.

In his old age, the Authority appointed the tyrannical archangel Metatron to act as regent of the Kingdom of Heaven. Eventually Metatron grew more powerful than his master. The two are opposed by Lord Asriel, who allies with "fallen" angels, such as Xaphania, in an attempt to overthrow the divine monarchy and replace it with a Republic of Heaven. During the final battle, the Authority is carried away from the Clouded Mountain on the orders of Metatron. He is imprisoned in a crystal box, which keeps him alive, but trapped. Lyra Belacqua and Will Parry free him with the Subtle Knife, not knowing he is too weak to survive outside his box. He drifts apart and dies, following other characters' precedent, in a moment of happiness by merging with the cosmos.

=== Xaphania ===
Xaphania is the leader of the rebel angels allied with Lord Asriel in the war against The Authority.

Xaphania first appears in the third book of the trilogy, The Amber Spyglass, at a council of Asriel's commanders. Like all Pullman's angels, she appears naked, winged, and luminous; due to her high rank and great age, she is clearly visible to corporeal beings. As is the norm with members of the angelic orders in the novels, there is a certain ambiguity surrounding Xaphania's exact appearance. She appears both ancient and young, compassionate and austere. Her simultaneous age and youth are remarked on by the witch Serafina Pekkala, who herself appears that way to shorter-lived people.

The angel Balthamos is the first character to refer explicitly to Xaphania. As he explains to Will Parry, she discovered that the Authority had lied to the other angels regarding his status as God the original Creator and so was banished from the Clouded Mountain. This was the start of the first struggle against the Kingdom, Xaphania being the leader of the rebel angels who intervened in human evolution to give mankind its present consciousness some thirty thousand years ago.

Towards the end of the trilogy, and after the defeat of the Authority's forces, it is Xaphania who instructs Will how to seal all the windows between the worlds, to prevent Dust from leaking away into the abyss, and informs him that the Æsahættr (the Subtle Knife) must be destroyed.

In the TV adaptation, Xaphania is voiced by Sophie Okonedo in angel form during season 1 and 2 and played by Chipo Chung in season 3. Her role is expanded in the TV series, where she gives the audience information about the Subtle Knife and also speaks to Dr Mary Malone through a machine called The Cave. In the audiobooks of The Amber Spyglass, she is played by Eve Karpf. In the 2003 BBC Radio adaptation, she is played by Jennie Stoller.

== Introduced in La Belle Sauvage ==
=== Malcolm Polstead ===
Malcolm Polstead and his dæmon Asta are eleven at the start of La Belle Sauvage. He is the protagonist of the story and is described as having "an inquisitive, kindly disposition, a stocky build, and ginger hair". His dæmon Asta has not yet settled into her final form. Malcolm is a regular visitor at the Priory of Saint Rosamund.

During La Belle Sauvage, Malcolm is living and working with his parents at their tavern. He attends the local school, where the Magisterium is seen influencing the pupils by encouraging them to join a club where they learn to intimidate and inform on people viewed unfavourably by the Church; Malcolm manages to avoid participating. Malcolm is viewed as a helpful and friendly boy who frequently visits and helps the nuns who live at the nearby priory. Malcolm becomes fascinated by the infant Lyra and becomes privy to the fact she is being secretly raised by the sisters due to the nature of her birth parents. When Malcolm accidentally stumbles upon Oakley Street operatives, he begins to become involved in some spying as he wants to protect the infant Lyra whom the Church appears to be after.

Lord Asriel visits the priory and requests Malcolm's help in escaping capture after seeing the infant Lyra. Asriel has Malcolm's canoe upgraded by local Gyptians craftsmen, and leaves his card inviting Malcolm to call on him if help is needed. Gyptian Farder Coram warns Malcolm of the upcoming storm, during which Malcolm goes to the priory to ensure that the infant Lyra and the sisters are safe. Malcolm rescues Alice and Lyra from being kidnapped by Gerard Bonneville. Malcolm kills the violent and insane Bonneville. He and Alice take the infant Lyra to Lord Asriel.

By the time of Lyra's Oxford, Malcolm is a scholar at Jordan College.

In The Secret Commonwealth, Dr Malcolm Polstead is a history scholar at Durham College, at Oxford University in Lyra's world. Asta has settled as a large ginger cat. Malcolm has been Lyra's tutor. Now, he realises that he is in love with her. He is sent by Oakley Street to investigate the phenomenon of rose oil allowing for the perception of Dust.

=== Gerard Bonneville ===
Dr Gerard Bonneville is a disgraced physicist with a hyena dæmon. He studied the Rusakov field, and at some point became involved with Marisa Coulter. He was cut off from his research on Dust due to his work being labelled as heretical, and seeks to obtain Lyra to trade for the ability to work on his research again.

Although Bonneville is seen as a charming handsome man, his hyena dæmon stands out in stark contrast to his own physical appearance. People find the creature unnerving and it has an aggressive nature. Bonneville has a history of violence, is shown to be going insane, and observed to be abusive towards his own dæmon – cursing, hitting, and mutilating her by cutting off her front legs. Malcolm and other characters witness some of this with revulsion, as harming one's own dæmon is considered an extremely disturbing act of self-mutilation. The text implies that Bonneville has paedophilic inclinations: Oakley Street agents discuss using Malcolm as bait to blackmail him, and he makes advances towards a fifteen-year-old Alice.

In La Belle Sauvage, during the flood, Bonneville follows Malcolm, Alice, and Lyra. Bonneville attacks Alice on the steps of a mausoleum during a storm. Malcolm is forced to beat Bonneville to death with a canoe paddle. Malcolm inherits Bonneville's research notes, and an alethiometer which he gives to the Master of Jordan College, when Lord Asriel seeks academic sanctuary for the infant Lyra.

=== Alice Parslow (Mrs Lonsdale) ===
Alice Parslow and her dæmon Ben are 15 in La Belle Sauvage. In The Secret Commonwealth, Alice is revealed to be the same person as Mrs Lonsdale, the housekeeper of Jordan College who is a minor character in Northern Lights, by which time she has been married and widowed, Ben has settled as a terrier.

== Introduced in The Secret Commonwealth ==
=== Marcel Delamere ===
Marcel Delamere, Lyra's uncle and an ambitious Magisterium Cardinal.

=== Oliver Bonneville ===
Oliver Bonneville, the son of Gerard Bonneville

=== Abdel Ionides ===
Abdel Ionides, Lyra's guide and a man of many names and uncertain motivations.

== Introduced in The Rose Field ==
=== Mustafa Bey ===
Mustafa Bey, a man of varied connections, and great influence in parts of the world Lyra travels through.
