= Lord Asriel =

- First appearance: La Belle Sauvage
- Last appearance: The Amber Spyglass
- Created by: Philip Pullman
- Portrayed by: Daniel Craig (film); Timothy Dalton (stage); James McAvoy (TV series); Terence Stamp (radio)
- Voiced by: Chris Edgerly (video game)

In-universe information
- Occupation: Experimental theologian and explorer
- Children: Lyra Belacqua (daughter)
- Age: late-40s to mid-50s through the main trilogy

Lord Asriel is a character in Philip Pullman's His Dark Materials trilogy. Asriel is a member of the aristocracy in a parallel universe dominated by the Church. Possessed of enormous determination and willpower, he is fierce in nature and commands great respect in both the political and academic spheres, being a military leader and a fellow of Jordan College in his world's version of Exeter College, Oxford.

His dæmon is called Stelmaria, a snow leopard.

== Naming ==
Asriel is one variant spelling of the Hebraic name Azrael, who occurs in the Jewish and Muslim tradition, and is traditionally believed to be the Angel of Death in some sects of Islam, as well as some Hebrew lore.

== History within the novel ==
Prior to the beginning of the trilogy, Lord Asriel had been a highly respected member of the 'Brytish' aristocracy. He had been an explorer and did work in "experimental theology", through which he acquired much power, land, and money. After having an affair with another politician's wife, Marisa Coulter, that resulted in the birth of Lyra, his life changed. Mrs Coulter's husband, Edward Coulter, attacked Lyra and her foster mother intending to harm and possibly murder Lyra. Lord Asriel intervened and killed Coulter. When the church found out, Asriel was tried and lost all property. Six-month-old Lyra was sent to a convent. Lord Asriel, who hated the church, arrived one day and took Lyra to his alma mater, Jordan College, where she was brought up believing Asriel to be her uncle, rather than her father.

At the beginning of the trilogy, Lord Asriel visits Jordan College where he is almost poisoned by the Master. Asriel is saved by Lyra, who has secretly been watching the Master pour the poison into Lord Asriel's wine glass. Asriel is giving a Lecture to the Fellows of Jordan College hoping to raise money for an expedition. In the lecture he uses photograms of Dust and a city in the sky, as well as a severed head that he says is Stanislaus Grumman's. He travels to Svalbard but is imprisoned and guarded by the bear warriors known as the panserbjørne, led by Iofur Raknison. This action has been ordered by the General Oblation Board, which is headed by his ex-lover, Marisa Coulter. He receives hospitable treatment, and waits for a child on whom to perform intercision (a process to detach a child's dæmon that often results in the child's death). He is hoping to open a window in the aurora using the energy generated by the intercision in order to travel into a different universe. Eventually a child arrives, Roger Parslow, unwittingly brought by Lyra.

Asriel enters Cittàgazze and, after a battle, allies himself with the rebel angels under Xaphania. He travels to an empty world and builds an enormous basalt fortress, gathering armies from many different worlds to start his rebellion against the Kingdom of Heaven. Ruta Skadi finds him, and he tells her his plan, and gets her clan's support in the war.

Later, he has his allies, King Ogunwe and Lord Roke, find and rescue Lyra from Mrs Coulter. They capture Mrs Coulter, but Lyra and Will escape with two of Lord Roke's agents. Lord Asriel then attends to Mrs Coulter and tries to influence Lyra and Will, as they hold the key to renewing the Dust flow. Lord Asriel lets Mrs Coulter escape in an 'Intention Craft' and has Lord Roke follow her to gain information from the Consistorial Court of Discipline. They learn that the Church has made a bomb to kill Lyra, and Lord Asriel rescues Mrs Coulter just in time. He destroys Saint-Jean Les Eaux (the location of the bomb) with his Intention Craft.

Lyra survives, and Lord Asriel has his army search for her and Will's dæmons so the Authority's armies will be unable to control them. When Lord Asriel finds that the bomb has blown a hole under all the worlds into the abyss, he devises a plan to defeat the Authority's powerful Regent, Metatron. As his forces fight the armies of the Authority and the Church, Mrs Coulter tricks Metatron into trying to kill Lord Asriel and to take Lyra's dæmon. As they are standing on the edge of the abyss, Lord Asriel and Mrs Coulter sacrifice themselves, falling into the abyss and taking Metatron with them. All three are condemned to fall through the abyss for eternity.

== Lyra and Marisa Coulter ==
Marisa Coulter was Edward Coulter's wife. Lyra, the product of Marisa's affair with Lord Asriel, was born when Marisa was just 21. Lyra resembled Asriel rather than Edward Coulter, so Mrs Coulter gave her to Asriel, who placed their daughter with a gyptian woman, later revealed to be Ma Costa. When Edward Coulter found out about the affair, he went to kill the baby Lyra, but Asriel fought and killed Edward. Asriel had his wealth and status taken away, and Lyra was placed in a convent. Asriel, outraged, took Lyra from the convent, and placed her at Jordan College, and ordered the Master to never allow Mrs Coulter to contact Lyra. However, Marisa eventually turns up, intending to take Lyra north. Lyra agrees, but escapes when she discovers Mrs Coulter's intentions for the stolen children, as the head of the Oblation Board. When Lyra is kidnapped and taken to Bolvangar, Marisa races in to rescue her just as Lyra and Pantalaimon are about to be severed. In the film adaptation, she comforts Lyra and tells her she is her mother. Horrified, Lyra escapes once again, and this time she seeks out Lord Asriel to deliver the alethiometer. Unknowingly, Lyra leads her friend, Roger, to his death at the hands of Asriel, as Asriel requires the energy release of severing a child from their daemon in order to open the rift between the worlds. At this time Mrs Coulter and Lord Asriel briefly meet, but Asriel leaves her to continue his campaign while Mrs Coulter hesitates.

Lord Asriel and Mrs Coulter meet once again in The Amber Spyglass, when Mrs Coulter is captured by Asriel's men. He rescues her once as well and takes her back to his adamant tower. She and Asriel join forces to defeat Metatron, the powerful regent of the Authority, simply to give Lyra, their child, a chance to live. They die together in a chasm between worlds to destroy Metatron.

== Stage, film and television characterisations ==
Daniel Craig as Lord Asriel in the film The Golden Compass.

From December 2003 to March 2004, London's Royal National Theatre staged an adaptation of His Dark Materials in which Lord Asriel was played by Timothy Dalton.

Daniel Craig played the role of Lord Asriel in the 2007 film adaptation The Golden Compass with Nicole Kidman playing Marisa Coulter.

James McAvoy plays the role in the BBC television adaptation.
