= Lyra Belacqua =

Protagonist in His Dark Materials

Lyra Silvertongue Lyra Belacqua
- First appearance: Northern Lights (1995)
- Last appearance: The Rose Field (2025)
- Created by: Philip Pullman
- Portrayed by: Dakota Blue Richards (film); Dafne Keen (TV series); Anna Maxwell Martin (stage); Elaine Symons (stage)
- Voiced by: Jo Wyatt (audio); Lulu Popplewell (radio drama); Dakota Blue Richards (video game)

In-universe information
- Gender: Female
- Family: Lord Asriel (father); Marisa Coulter (mother), Olivier Bonneville (half-brother)
- Significant other: Will Parry (His Dark Materials)
- Age: Less than 1 (La Belle Sauvage) around 11–13 (His Dark Materials); 15 (Lyra's Oxford); 17–18 (Serpentine); 20–21 (The Secret Commonwealth and The Rose Field)
- Dæmon: Pantalaimon "Pan"
- Special gifts: Ability to read the alethiometer (a rare truth-telling device) and to lie convincingly

Lyra Belacqua (/ˈlaɪrə bəˈlɑːkwə/ LY-rə bə-LAH-kwə), later known as Lyra Silvertongue, is the heroine of Philip Pullman's trilogy His Dark Materials. In His Dark Materials Lyra is a young girl who inhabits a universe parallel to our own. Brought up in the cloistered world of Jordan College, Oxford, she finds herself embroiled in a cosmic war between Lord Asriel on one side, and a deity figure known as The Authority and his Regent, Metatron, on the other. Lyra also features prominently in the subsequent trilogy The Book of Dust.

== Background and life ==
Lyra Belacqua, aged around eleven at the beginning of the trilogy, is the daughter of Lord Asriel and Marisa Coulter in a fictional Oxford, similar to our own. She is being brought up at Jordan College, where the scholars, professors and servants treat her as an adopted daughter. She has been raised believing that her parents died in an airship crash, and that Lord Asriel is her uncle; she later learns the truth from John Faa, leader of the Gyptians. Lyra spends much of her time socialising with other children of the city, sometimes harmoniously, frequently mock-violently, and often in order to avoid schoolwork. Her closest friend among the other children is a Jordan kitchen boy named Roger Parslow, who disappears early in Northern Lights. The search to find Roger, and other children, is Lyra's motivation throughout much of Northern Lights.

Lyra is described as having wavy dirty-blonde hair and pale-blue eyes, and is thin and short for her age. Lyra is unruly and tomboyish and her complete disregard for her appearance and personal hygiene exasperates her adult carers. She receives a scant and haphazard education at the hands of Jordan scholars, being neither interested in study nor officially a student of the college. However, she is highly intelligent, and is particularly talented at deceiving others; she is capable of making up complex yet plausible lies on the spur of the moment. Initially she uses this talent to avoid punishment by her guardians, and to entertain and deceive other children, but later in the series employs it to save her own life and the lives of others. She deceives Iofur Raknison, king of the panserbjørne ("armoured bears" in Danish) of Svalbard, by suggesting that she can become his dæmon if Iofur defeats Iorek in combat. Tricking a panserbjørn was a feat that her friend Iorek Byrnison had believed to be impossible for a human, and her success prompts Iorek to informally christen her "Silvertongue", which is the surname by which she is known in The Secret Commonwealth.

The character's first name comes from Lyra Davidica, which means "harp of David." Lyra Davidica is the title of a hymnal collection, but Pullman mistook it for the author's name of an Easter hymn he liked, as it was printed under the hymn. He later realised it wasn't actually a person's name, though due to the popularity of the character, 'Lyra' has now become one. The name is also a pun on the word "liar", and the connection between these two words is emphasized by the text.

Lyra's surname is the name of a character in Dante's Divine Comedy, Belacqua, a soul in the ante-purgatory, represents those who wait until the last opportunity before turning to God. The mood in the ante-purgatory is said to be one of helplessness, nostalgia, and yearning – Belacqua and the other souls in ante-purgatory are caught between two worlds and lack clear understanding of themselves. Whether this has any connection to Lyra is not known.

== Pantalaimon ==
Lyra's dæmon, Pantalaimon /ˌpæntəˈlaɪmən/, is her dearest companion, whom she calls "Pan". In common with dæmons of all children, he can take any animal form he pleases; he first appears in the story as a dark brown moth. His name is a given male name in the Eastern Orthodox world (Παντελεήμων Panteleēmon), which in Greek means "all-compassionate". He changes into many forms throughout the series, ranging from a dragon to an eagle, but his favourite forms are a snow-white ermine, a moth, a wildcat, and a mouse. At the end of the trilogy, as Lyra is entering adulthood, Pantalaimon finds his final form when Will Parry touches him, and is later described as a beautiful pine marten, red-gold in colour with a "patch of cream-white fur" on his throat.

Pantalaimon is portrayed as a cautious and level-headed counterpoint to Lyra's impulsive, inquisitive, and sometimes reckless character.

Lyra must separate from Pantalaimon when she enters the Land of the Dead in The Amber Spyglass, causing extreme pain to both of them; Pantalaimon avoids Lyra for a while afterwards. However, surviving this separation allows the two to move great distances from one another, an ability only witches and shamans generally possess in her world.

== Role ==
In the first novel of His Dark Materials, Northern Lights (known in US and some other countries as The Golden Compass), Serafina Pekkala tells of the prophecy of a girl who is "destined to bring about the end of destiny". The witches' prophecy states that this girl will be able to pick the "correct" cloud-pine branch out of several, as indeed Lyra does. It transpires that Lyra's destiny is to be the second Eve and fall into the temptation of the serpent, represented by Mary Malone. Will Parry and the Dust in the abyss are corrected, and the universes start to work in harmony. In order to ensure the stability of the universes and protect people from the creation of Spectres, Will and Lyra must close all of the inter-world windows with the help of angels and keep them closed forever – and since their dæmons cannot survive long outside of their own birth worlds, they must part forever. Despite this, they decide to sit on the same bench each year for an hour at noon on Midsummer's Day, in the Botanic Gardens in their separate Oxfords – so that they might feel themselves to be in each other's presence. She fulfils her destiny to "bring an end to death" by leading the ghosts out of the world of the dead.

In the most recent edition of The Amber Spyglass released in the UK, the post-script "Lantern Slides" section shows Lyra studying the alethiometer (a rare truth-telling device) with Pantalaimon at age 18. She is excited to start recognising a pattern in the readings, and Pullman tells us that this discovery of a pattern is the "second thing she said to Will next day in the Botanic Garden", implying that the next day was Midsummer's Day, when she and Will would be sitting on the same bench in their separate worlds.

Letters written by Lyra included in the companion book Once Upon a Time in the North reveal that Lyra is researching her dissertation for a M.Phil. in Economic History, showing she is still studying in her twenties. The title of her dissertation is Developments of patterns of trade in the European Arctic region with particular reference to independent balloon carriage (1950–1970). In the first letter, Lyra also mentions that she is continuing to study the alethiometer. Once she finishes her studies, she will be able to read the alethiometer not with grace, as she used to, but with certainty and knowledge.

== In other media ==
In the 1999 unabridged audio production, Lyra was performed by the voice-over actress Jo Wyatt (as Joanna Wyatt).

In a 2003 BBC radio adaptation, Lyra was voiced by child actress Lulu Popplewell.

The National Theatre in London staged a two-part, six-hour-long adaptation of the novels. The production ran in 2003 and 2004; Lyra was played by Anna Maxwell Martin in the first run and by Elaine Symons in the second.

In The Golden Compass, the film adaptation of the first book, Lyra is portrayed by Dakota Blue Richards. British singer/songwriter Kate Bush wrote and recorded a song, "Lyra", for the film which features choristers from Magdalen College School in Oxford.

Dafne Keen plays Lyra in the BBC television adaptation.

== See also ==
- List of His Dark Materials and The Book of Dust characters
- His Dark Materials
- Races and creatures in His Dark Materials
- Locations in His Dark Materials
