= Dæmon (His Dark Materials) =

Fictional being from Philip Pullman's His Dark Materials

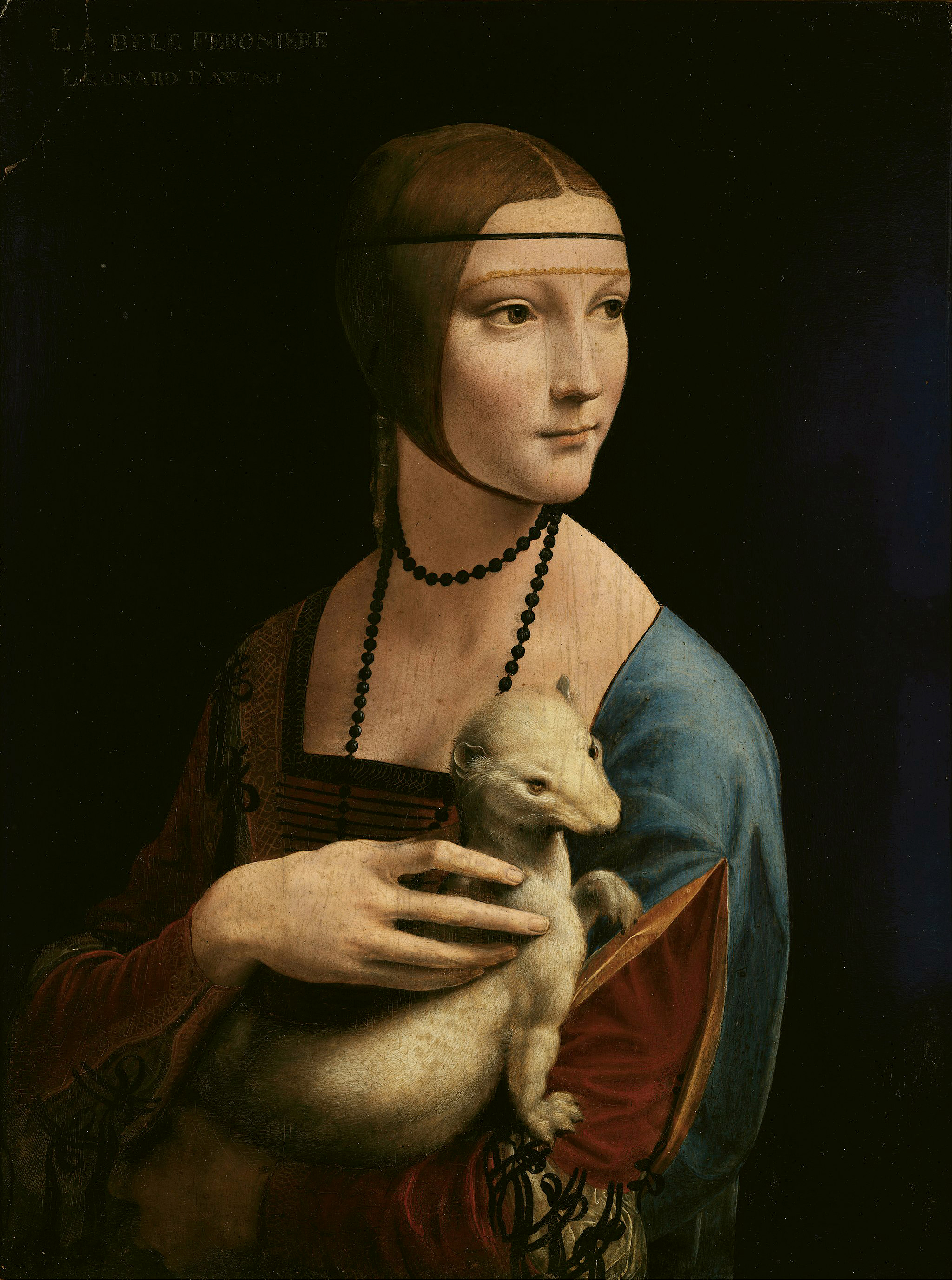
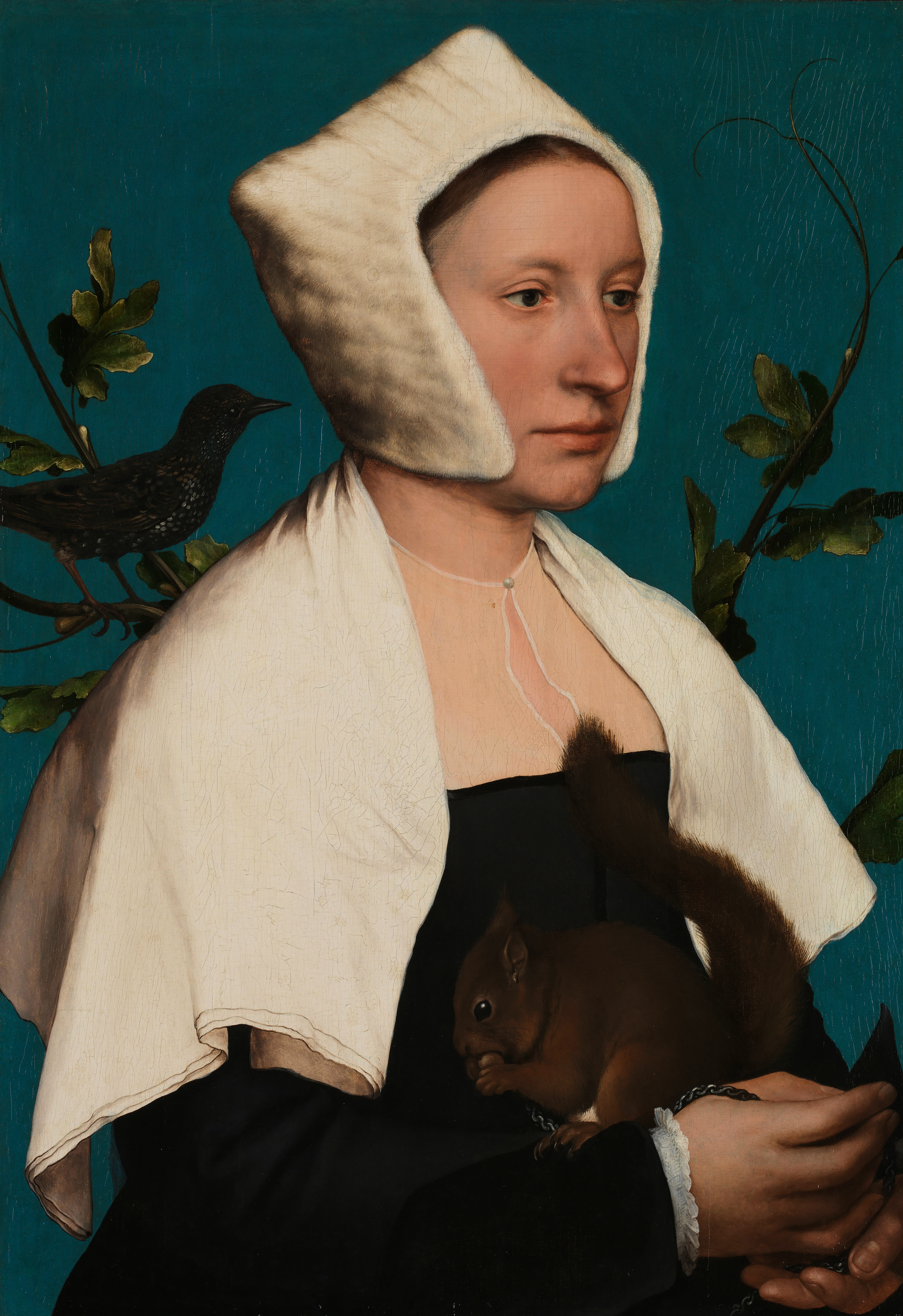
Leonardo da Vinci's Lady with an Ermine (1489–91) and Hans Holbein the Younger's Portrait of a Lady with a Squirrel and a Starling (1526–1528) served as inspirations for Pullman's dæmon

A dæmon (/ˈdiːmən/) is a type of fictional being in the Philip Pullman fantasy trilogies His Dark Materials and The Book of Dust. Dæmons are the external physical manifestation of a person's "inner-self" that takes the form of an animal. Dæmons have human intelligence, are capable of human speech—regardless of the form they take—and usually behave as though they are independent of their humans. Pre-pubescent children's dæmons can change form voluntarily to become any creature, real or imaginary. During adolescence a person's dæmon undergoes "settling", an event in which that person's dæmon permanently and involuntarily assumes the form of the animal which the person most resembles in character. Dæmons are usually of the opposite sex to their human, though same-sex dæmons do exist.

Dæmons frequently interact with each other in ways that mirror the behaviour of their humans, such as fighting one another when their humans are fighting, or nuzzling one another when their humans embrace, and such contact is seen as normal. However, for a human to touch another person's dæmon is taboo.

== Background ==
Pullman says his inspirations for dæmons were Leonardo da Vinci's Lady with an Ermine, Giovanni Battista Tiepolo's Young Woman with a Macaw and Hans Holbein the Younger's The Lady and the Squirrel, all portraits in which there seemed to be "a psychological link between the person and the creature". Another influence was the daimon described in Plato's Apology of Socrates: "Socrates talked about his 'daimon'. I found it a very fruitful metaphor."

== In-universe information ==
=== Form ===
Dæmons supposedly occur in every world, but in Lyra's universe they take an external shape, even if they are not corporeal. Typically dæmons and their humans are conscious or asleep at the same time. However, the dæmons of witches and shamans can remain awake while their humans sleep.

"The worst breach of etiquette imaginable" is for a human to touch another person's dæmon; even in battle, most soldiers would never touch an enemy's dæmon, though there are exceptions (such as between lovers or in particularly violent fights). Dæmons can touch other dæmons freely; interactions between dæmons usually accentuate and illuminate the relationships between the characters, and can also be used as a means of passing information between humans without being overheard. The sexual element of human/dæmon interaction is also reflected when Pantalaimon and Kirjava assume their final forms, as they officially settle after Will and Lyra stroke the other's dæmon.

During puberty, children's dæmons "settle" into a form which reflects their mature personality. A person's dæmon is usually of the opposite sex to its human; very occasionally it may be the same sex as the person. Pullman said he doesn't know why, and that it may also indicate some other gift or quality, such as second sight, or that the person is homosexual, adding "There are plenty of things about my worlds I don't know, and that's one of them".

=== Separation ===
Normally, a person and their dæmon must stay within a few yards of each other. The exact distance the two can separate is unclear; Lee Scoresby expresses surprise when a bird dæmon travels forty yards from her human, while Lyra is uncomfortable when Pan goes to a second storey window while she is standing in front of the same building. Such separation from one's dæmon – sometimes called "pulling" – causes extreme pain and distress for both human and dæmon, and, given enough distance, results in death. That said, witches and shamans' dæmons can travel separately.

The most detailed account in the books shows pulling to be torturous both physically – like "an iron hand pulling one's heart out between one's ribs" – and emotionally. A permanent separation between human and dæmon kills both and releases a huge burst of energy, which for instance is harnessed by Lord Asriel to blast a hole between two overlapping universes at the end of Northern Lights. The General Oblation Board initially accomplished this separation through simply tearing child and dæmon apart, but this generally resulted in the subject dying of shock.

Certain trained people, particularly witches and human shamans, have achieved the ability to survive separation from their dæmons by undergoing an initial voluntary separation done at a special location. For the witches this is at a canyon underneath the earth in Lyra's world. Shamans endure gruelling ordeals that involve leaving their dæmon as they embark on a spiritual quest, crossing an area of death where nothing may grow or live. After rejoining their dæmon they gain the ability to separate from them to a far greater extent than previously, while both witches and shamans regain their intimate bond with their dæmon. Lyra and Will achieve the ability to be distant from their dæmons by going through the World of the Dead.

Some humans, for example Marisa Coulter, are able to go farther from their dæmons than most others. Mrs. Coulter's dæmon, a golden monkey, goes into Lyra's room when she is staying with Mrs. Coulter to find her alethiometer (truth reader) despite not having undergone intercision, with Mrs. Coulter talking to Lyra perfectly normally at the same time. The reasons Mrs. Coulter can do this are not stated.

The Secret Commonwealth establishes that others have undergone separation from their dæmons or have pushed the bond past its usual limits. On one occasion, Pantalaimon discovers a woman who has become separated from her dæmon after a boat sank with the dæmon on it, the two having been unable to find each other after this even as the girl's continued survival makes it clear that the dæmon is still alive. In Lyra's search for Pantalaimon, after he leaves her following a conflict, Lyra learns that there are groups of poor in distant countries who actually sell their children's dæmons through an organisation selling dæmons.

=== Lifespan ===
The books do not indicate when or how, or into what form, a dæmon is "born", but a baby's dæmon takes the form of a baby animal. When a person dies, their dæmon fades away like "atoms of smoke." Likewise, when a dæmon is killed, its human dies as well. How a dæmon acquires a name is not explained in the books, but clarified by Philip Pullman as being normally given by the parents' dæmons. As Will Parry came from our world, his dæmon was not given a name in this way and was named Kirjava (meaning mottled in Finnish) by Serafina Pekkala when she first met the dæmon.

== Analysis ==
Maude Hines in her essay on Philip Pullman's work wrote that the concept of the dæmon, as a clearly fantastic element, epitomizes Bourdieu's "space of the possibles", and that the dæmon is "an animal familiar like Jung's anima/animus, which acts as an externalized conscience or soul". Maude Hines in her essay "Second Nature: Daemons and Ideology in The Golden Compass" called dæmons "one of the most remarkable aspects" of Pullman's world, and notes that they "function as conceit for playing out questions of the natural" in it.

== See also ==
- Agathodaemon
- Aku-aku
- Anima and animus
- Daimon
- Familiar spirit
- Fylgja
- Nagual
- Tonal (mythology)
- Totem
