= The Rose Field =

2025 fantasy novel by Philip Pullman

- Author: Philip Pullman
- Illustrator: Christopher Wormell
- Language: English
- Series: The Book of Dust
- Release number: 3
- Genre: Fantasy
- Publisher: Penguin Random House
- Publication date: 23 October 2025
- Publication place: United Kingdom
- ISBN: 978-0-241-79757-0
- Preceded by: The Secret Commonwealth

The Rose Field is a fantasy novel by Philip Pullman. It is the third volume in The Book of Dust series and the final book about the character Lyra Silvertongue. The book was published on 23 October 2025 by David Fickling Books in association with Penguin Random House and Alfred A. Knopf. The Rose Field is set directly after The Secret Commonwealth, published in 2019.

== Title ==
The "Rose Field" of the title refers to a field in the sense of a magnetic or gravitational field. It was first mentioned (under the name Rusakov Field) in the opening chapters of Northern Lights during a discussion of the mysterious phenomenon called Dust.

== Setting ==
The setting is a world dominated by the Magisterium, an international theocracy which actively suppresses heresy. In this world, humans' souls naturally exist outside of their bodies in the form of sapient "dæmons" in animal form which accompany, aid, and comfort their humans. An important plot device is the alethiometer, a truth-telling symbol reader.

The story immediately follows the events of the previous novel, The Secret Commonwealth. Lyra is in search of her dæmon, Pantalaimon, and Malcolm is searching for Lyra. The novel is set twenty years or so after the events of La Belle Sauvage and ten years after the conclusion of the His Dark Materials trilogy.

== Plot ==
In the desert, Lyra's alethiometer is stolen. She recovers the needle, but the device's gold body attracts a gryphon, who flies away with it. Lyra travels East, heading for what she believes is Pantalaimon's destination as he searches for her imagination.

In Aleppo, Lyra introduces herself to Mustafa Bey, a wealthy Turkish merchant, who gives her a signed pass to ease her passage through his trading empire. In the Brazilian Embassy Gardens, she is set upon by Olivier Bonneville (son of Gerard Bonneville), who has been tracking her movements with an alethiometer he has taken from the Magisterium. Malcolm Polstead, who has been receiving instructions from Oakley Street, arrives along with the guide Abdel Ionides. Lyra narrowly avoids capture by Magisterium agents and Malcolm is carried away by a gryphon. Ionides is caught, but Lyra is able to rescue him from his cell using the alethiometer needle.

Lyra and Ionides take a long-distance bus East, their journey ending when Mustafa Bey is murdered, rendering his passport invalid. Following a collapse in trade and currency, they escape riots in Baku in a small fishing boat.

Meanwhile, the gryphons have flown Malcolm to their mountain retreat where he poses as an artificer and promises to repair the gold case of Lyra's alethiometer. Pan arrives on the back of a small gryphon named Gulya, whom he has saved from an attack by a giant bird. Gulya's size is the result of an enchantment by the sorcerer Sorush, and Malcolm promises the gryphons that he can help Gulya kill Sorush, liberating his untold quantities of gold. Tilda Vasara, head of the Northern witches, flies in to warn the gryphons of a crisis of the air: a breakdown of the atmosphere possibly caused by a series of explosions in remote areas. Soldiers of the Magisterium have been carrying out explosive tests, trying to close windows to other worlds.

At Pan's request, Tilda Vasara carries him far to the East, towards the red building where he hopes to reunite with Lyra. With the witches' help, Sorush is killed and Gulya grows to her normal size. The gryphons join the witches to halt the armies of the Magisterium who are marching to the same destination, unwillingly guided by Bonneville.

Marcel Delamare, head of the Magisterium, delivers a sermon denouncing Lyra as a child born of sin, and warns of cracks and flaws in the world which are vulnerable to invasion, alien presence and moral corruption. He announces that his armies will be marching to destroy the original breach, in Central Asia. He discloses that he is Mrs Coulter's brother, and hence Lyra's uncle.

Aided by the gryphons, Lyra and Malcolm arrive at the red building and learn that it serves as a huge trading hall for Rose Oil, sourced from another world. Going through a door, they find a building site, with roses grubbed up and new roads and a factory under construction. The locals, who have for years lived by the rose trade, have lost their livelihoods now that they are forced by law to use new Magisterium-controlled currency. Lyra and Malcolm catch up; learning that the so-called Rusakov Field was not named for its original discoverer, Lyra decides that it should from now on be called the Rose Field.

Having escaped on a stolen horse, Bonneville reaches the red building shortly after Pan, closely followed by the army of the Magisterium. The army detonates explosives, sealing the door to the other world; Lyra uses the alethiometer needle to cut her way back. Delamare is killed by Bonneville, and Lyra and Pan are at last reunited.

Lyra learns that Bonneville is her half-brother, and the two come to an understanding. Lyra and Pan discuss Dust; Lyra suggests that Dust is the result of human imagination interacting with the Rose Field.

== Principal characters ==
- Lyra Silvertongue (formerly Belaqua): protagonist
- Malcolm Polstead: Lyra's former teacher and friend; Oakley Street agent
- Abdel Ionides (formerly Professor Rashid Xenakis): Lyra's guide
- Glenys Godwin: director of Oakley Street
- Tilda Vasara: queen of the northern witches
- Mustafa Bey: wealthy Turkish merchant
- Marcel Delamare, head of the Magisterium
- Olivier Bonneville: Delamare's nephew, alethiometer specialist
- Sorush: sorcerer
- Gulya: a gryphon, enchanted by Sorush

== Critical reception ==
Writing in The Guardian, Sarah Crown praised the author for bringing The Book of Dust trilogy to a complex and fitting end, though she considered the story to be rather circuitous in places. Nevertheless, the narrative drive is, she said, strong enough to carry the reader over the digressions, and the novel ends with a "fantastically nail‑biting ride".

== Conception ==
Pullman reported challenges writing the novel due to the COVID-19 pandemic and aging. In an interview with The Washington Post, he described writing by computer instead of on paper, due to pain in his hand: "I couldn't write this one by hand as I had for the previous 50, 60 years." In another interview, Pullman described his feelings on the culmination of his The Book of Dust series, stating: "This whole series took 30 years. And you don't undertake a task like that unless you can do it with all your being, including your moral being."
