= Titanium gold =

Alloy consisting of titanium and gold

In metallurgy, titanium gold (Ti-Au or Au-Ti) refers to an alloy consisting of titanium and gold. Such alloys are used in dentistry, ceramics and jewelry. Like many other alloys, titanium gold alloys have a higher yield strength, tensile strength, hardness, and magnetism than either of its constituent metals.

In July 2016, researchers led by Emilia Morosan at Rice University discovered that a titanium-gold alloy, β-Ti_{3}Au, is an intermetallic alloy that is up to 4 times harder than pure titanium and most steels.

== In popular culture ==
In the 2008 film Iron Man, the title character wears an armor made from a titanium-gold alloy. According to actor Robert Downey Jr., who played the role of Iron Man, the suit fit him "like a gold-titanium glove".

In the 2019 book The Secret Commonwealth (part of the universe of His Dark Materials trilogy), the alethiometer is revealed to be made primarily of a titanium-gold alloy.

In S6:E22 of The Blacklist the show's computer wizz, Aram Mojtabai, comments that the cage originally created to house Reddington is made of titanium gold alloy.

== See also ==
- Titanium nitride, a gold-coloured, hard-wearing coating for steel
