= Serpentine (book) =

2020 novella by Philip Pullman

- Author: Philip Pullman
- Cover artist: Tom Duxbury
- Language: English
- Genre: Fantasy
- Publisher: Penguin Random House Children's
- Publication date: United Kingdom: 15 October 2020
- Publication place: United Kingdom
- Media type: Print (Hardback)
- Pages: 80
- ISBN: 9780241475249

Serpentine is a fantasy novella written by Philip Pullman, set after the events of his His Dark Materials trilogy and before the events of The Secret Commonwealth, the second book of his The Book of Dust trilogy. The manuscript was originally sold at a charity auction in 2004 and the book was publicly released in October 2020.

== Origins ==
Serpentine was not originally intended for publication but was instead written in 2004 at the special request of Nicholas Hytner (then the artistic director at the Royal National Theatre) to be auctioned for charity during the company's production of His Dark Materials; the work sold for a "substantial sum". At the time of writing Pullman had not intended to revisit Lyra as an adult but after the publication of The Secret Commonwealth decided to issue the novella as it prefigures Lyra and Pantalaimon's character development in The Book of Dust.

== Synopsis ==
In this story, a teenage Lyra and her dæmon Pantalaimon revisit Trollesund, the Arctic town prominently featured in Northern Lights as the place of her first meeting with the aeronaut Lee Scoresby and the armoured bear Iorek Byrnison. They seek the witch-consul Dr. Lanselius in the hope of finding answers to their ability to separate.

== Audiobook ==
An audiobook narrated by Olivia Colman was released on the same day as the print and ebook versions.
