= Sraf =

SRAF can refer to:

- the Social Revolutionary Anarchist Federation, a defunct American anarchist group,
- a word used to refer to "dust" by mulefa in Philip Pullman's His Dark Materials novels,
- the acronym Subresolution Assist Features in Semiconductor device fabrication.
