= The Golden Compass (video game) =

2007 video game

- Developers: Shiny Entertainment; Artificial Mind and Movement (DS)
- Publisher: Sega
- Directors: Michael Persson; David Msika
- Producers: Maja Persson; Jorge Oseguera; Lidia C. Hernandez; Mark Harwood
- Designers: Dax Berg; Benjamin Cholewinski; Kenneth Lee
- Programmer: Martin Jensen
- Artist: Jonathan Gwyn
- Writer: Dalan Musson
- Composer: Jamie Christopherson
- Platforms: PlayStation 2, PlayStation 3, PlayStation Portable, Wii, Xbox 360, Windows, Nintendo DS
- Release: PS2, PS3, Wii, Xbox360, DS: EU: November 30, 2007; NA: December 4, 2007; PSP & Windows: NA: December 4, 2007; EU: December 7, 2007
- Genres: Action-adventure, puzzle, platform, beat 'em up
- Modes: Single-player, multiplayer (DS only)

The Golden Compass is a 2007 action-adventure puzzle video game developed by Shiny Entertainment for PlayStation 2, PlayStation 3, PlayStation Portable, Wii, Xbox 360 and Microsoft Windows, and by A2M for Nintendo DS. The game was published on all platforms by Sega, and was released in Europe in November 2007 (except the PSP and Windows versions, which were released in December), and in North America in December. It is the video game of the 2007 film of the same name, although it is also partially based on the 1995 novel upon which the film is based, Northern Lights by Philip Pullman. The game was released prior to the film and features a slightly different sequence of events towards the end of the story, as well as additional footage at the end of the game not seen in the film. This was due to a last minute re-edit of the last half-hour of the film by New Line Cinema, which could not be incorporated into the game, as it was based on the shooting script. The Golden Compass was the last game developed by Shiny before Foundation 9 Entertainment merged them with The Collective. A significant feature has Dakota Blue Richards and Freddie Highmore reprising their roles from the film.

The game received primarily negative reviews across all platforms, with many reviewers arguing the plot was incomprehensible unless one were familiar with the film and/or novel. Other common criticisms included graphical glitches, poor gameplay and level design, bugs, and a general sense that the game was rushed to release before it was ready (a common aspect of licensed tie-in games from this era).

== Gameplay ==
The Golden Compass is an action-adventure/puzzle game played from a third-person perspective. Players control either Lyra Belacqua and her dæmon Pan, or the panserbjørn Iorek Byrnison. Lyra's levels primarily involve platforming, stealth and puzzle solving, whilst Iorek's are mainly melee combat based.

Gameplay in the PlayStation 3 version of The Golden Compass. Lyra uses Pan in his sloth form to swing from one platform to another. The icon on the top right indicates Pan's current form.

A major aspect of the gameplay in Lyra's levels involves the shape-shifting ability of Pan, who can transform into four different forms; Ermine, Sloth, Hawk and Wildcat, with each form having its own unique ability. The Ermine's ability is "Insight", which allows Lyra to discover information about her surroundings, find hotspots, and reveal secrets. The Sloth's ability is "Whip", which allows Lyra to swing from poles and reach areas she cannot jump to. The Hawk's ability is "Glide", which allows Lyra to glide a short distance, covering gaps she wouldn't be able to get across any other way. The Wildcat's ability is "Climb", which allows Lyra to climb certain surfaces to reach otherwise inaccessible areas. Players often have to shift form mid-move. For example, to reach a certain platform, the player may need to use the "Whip" ability to have Lyra swing on a pole. After releasing her from the pole, the player may then need to immediately use the "Glide" ability to reach the platform, necessitating a form change whilst Lyra is in midair.

Also important in Lyra's levels are Evasion and Deception minigames. Evasion games occur whenever Lyra is spotted by an enemy, and involves pressing buttons to correspond with icons on screen to allow Lyra escape from her pursuer. Deception games are more common. These games take place whenever Lyra is involved in a conversation with someone and is attempting to deceive them. The better the player performs in the minigame, the more successful Lyra is in her deception. The minigames include, but are not limited to, matching symbols, collecting falling icons, avoiding falling icons, a Whac-A-Mole type game and a snooker type game.

Another major aspect of the gameplay is the alethiometer (a rare truth-telling device which features in the novels). Once the player has access to the Alethiometer, it can be asked certain set questions. The device has thirty-six symbols on its outer edge, each with three meanings. These meanings are discovered over the course of game; some are learned automatically as the plot advances, others must be sought out by the player and can be missed. For each question, Lyra is given three words, and each word is assigned a hand on the Alethiometer. If Lyra knows the corresponding symbol of a given word, the hand automatically turns to the correct symbol. Words she doesn't know must be guessed by the player. When the three hands are all pointing at symbols, the player confirms the selection and Lyra asks the question. A balancing minigame then begins, where the player must press buttons corresponding to the on-screen display. The more symbols which were correctly identified in the first part of the game, the easier the balancing game is. If the player successfully completes the balancing game, the Alethiometer will answer the question.

== Story ==
The game begins with Lyra Belacqua, the Panserbjørne Iorek Byrnison and Lyra's dæmon Pan in an icy landscape being pursued by wolves. Iorek defeats the wolves and they head to a nearby Samoyed camp where they rescue a boy.

The game then returns to two months previously, with Lyra and Pan in her room in Jordan College discussing the imminent return of her uncle, Lord Asriel, before evading her caretaker to play. She spends time with her friend and fellow student Roger Parslow and a few Gyptian boys, and then decides to sneak into the Master's Retiring Room so she can watch Asriel's presentation. She hides in a wardrobe and sees Asriel present a picture from his travels in Svalbard showing "Dust" falling from the sky. Asriel subsequently finds her and tells her he is leaving on a difficult journey.

Meanwhile, Lyra meets Marisa Coulter and, before leaving Jordan, is given an Alethiometer by the Master who tells her Coulter must not know about it. Whilst exploring Coulter's apartment, Lyra finds a document with the names of numerous children, including Roger's, and the letterhead of the "General Oblation Board," and she realizes that Coulter is the leader of the Board; an organization that abducts children, supposedly to prevent them turning into "bad" adults. Lyra and Pan flee.

Coulter sends men to get Lyra and Pan back, but they are saved by Gyptians, and begin living on their ship, the Noorderlicht. Lyra learns how to use the Alethiometer more proficiently than any adult, and is visited by the witch queen Serafina Pekkala who tells her where the General Oblation Board has taken the missing children. The next day, the Noorderlicht docks at Trollesund, where they are joined by Iorek and Lee Scoresby, a Texan aeronaut.

The party hike north towards Bolvangar, where the children are held. While consulting the Alethiometer, Lyra gets a message about a cabin on a lake. She sneaks out of the camp with Iorek, and inside the cabin they find a psychologically damaged child who has been severed from his dæmon; a nightmarish process called "Intercision," which is practiced by the Magisterium, the most dominant religious group in the world, in an effort to generate energy. Lyra learns from the Alethiometer that another child is nearby in a Samoyed camp, and she and Iorek head to save him. The opening scenes of the game are shown again. Lyra, Iorek and the two children head back to the Gyptian camp where the two boys are reunited with their families. However, the Samoyeds attack, and Lyra is captured.

She is taken to the General Oblation Board's facility in Bolvangar, where she is reunited with Roger. She is then brought to see Coulter, to whom she lies, saying she was forcibly taken from the apartment, and pretends she is unable to understand the Alethiometer. She then flees from Coulter, sets off a fire alarm and destroys the Intercision machine. With the facility in chaos, the children escape outside. Meanwhile, Iorek and an army of witches led by Serafina destroy the facility.

Lyra, Scoresby and Serafina travel on to Svalbard to try to find Asriel. However, in a snowsquall, Lyra falls overboard and is captured by two panserbjørne. In a Svalbard prison, she learns Asriel is a prisoner of King Ragnar Sturlusson, although he is allowed to carry on his experiments at the special request of Coulter. Lyra learns from the Alethiometer that Iorek is on his way to rescue her. She tricks her way in to see Ragnar and claims she is Iorek's dæmon, created in an experiment at Bolvangar. As panserbjørne do not have dæmons, Ragnar is furious that Iorek should have something he cannot possess, and so Lyra tells him that for her to become his dæmon, he must kill Iorek in single combat. As such, Ragnar orders the guards to allow Iorek to approach. Iorek and Ragnar fight, and Iorek kills Ragnar, becoming the king of the panserbjørne.

Lyra, Pan and Roger then head to see Asriel. At first, he is furious that Lyra has come, exclaiming "I didn't send for you. Anyone but you," but upon seeing Roger, he calms. Lyra gives him the Alethiometer, and she and Roger go to bed. The next morning, Lyra awakens to find Asriel and Roger have disappeared. Using the Alethiometer, she learns that Asriel plans to perform an Intercision on Roger so as to generate enough energy to open a portal to a parallel universe. She, Pan and Iorek set out after them. They reach Asriel's location in the far north, and Iorek allows Lyra and Pan to head to face him.

== Development ==
The Golden Compass was unveiled on February 27, 2007, when Sega announced the game was being developed by Shiny Entertainment for PlayStation 2, PlayStation 3, PlayStation Portable, Xbox 360, Wii and Microsoft Windows, and by A2M for Nintendo DS. Sega revealed there would be thirteen levels in the game, including several locations not seen in the film, and players would be able to control Lyra, Pan and Iorek. The game would also feature the likenesses of the films' stars, but as of yet, voice acting roles had not been assigned.

"The game design from the onset was to try to appeal to two unique sets of fans. We need to appeal to a younger target audience knowing that this group of gamers will be taken back by the movie and want to experience more of this in an interactive format but we also knew from the onset that the audience we simply could not leave out was that of the core fan. The fan who read the book over a decade ago and fell in love with what Pullman had to say. Mechanics like the Alethiometer and hiring a game writer who was an extreme fan of the series was integral to proving that we care about the demographic that put this universe on the map. Though this is far from a "hard-core" gamer's game we still feel like there is most definitely something in this game for everyone."

— Dax Berg; lead designer

Footage of the game was first shown on May 10, when it was revealed that Shiny personnel had been on the film set every day of principal photography, shooting footage of sets, costumes and props, and watching the filming of action scenes. Sega revealed that two levels in the game would be set in locations visited in the book, but not the film, and that the game world would be more expansive than the film world, with locations seen only briefly in the film opened out in the game, such as Coulter's apartment. Shiny had worked very closely with the filmmakers, and had received digital scans of costumes, cyberscans of the principal cast's faces, set designs, plans, and concept art to facilitate the cutscenes' graphical recreation of the film world as closely as possible. The developers had also shot footage of numerous animals in Wildlife WayStation, which would be used to create the many dæmons in the game, as well as footage of polar bears in Churchill, Manitoba. To ensure the animals in the game moved as realistically as possible, the real footage was animated over by the art department.

The game was next shown at the 2007 E3 event in July, where a non-playable demo of the opening level was shown. The next footage was shown at the Games Convention in August when a finished version of the opening level was shown. The designers revealed the game opened roughly half-way through the story so that players would have an action-based level to begin in which they could control both Lyra/Pan and Iorek, rather than beginning the game in Jordan College with only Lyra available for control. They also explained that the Alethiometer will function in the game primarily as a means for expanding the story and unlocking bonus content rather than being something completely necessary for completing the game.

The Alethiometer minigame in the DS version of the game.

In an interview with IGN on November 22, lead game designer Dax Berg explained the inspiration behind the Deception minigames:

Early on we felt that Deception was a key theme throughout the universe so its impact in the game was critical. Lyra uses her skills in subterfuge to gain access to key locations, learns valuable information and even uses rhetoric to further her own goals in side quests and non-critical path scenarios. I'm sure the correlation between the name "Lyra" and the word "liar" was intentional and the game owes it to its fans to represent this. We have devised an entire deception mechanic within the game which is played out in a series of flowing conversation rounds where Lyra attempts to win over her opponent by means of persuasion. However, we use this same mechanic in a multitude of NPC approaches where Lyra can both outwit her enemies and "embellish" explanations to her allies. Our focus test showed that people really enjoyed this even as a stand-alone.

Speaking of the Alethiometer, he stated "Once the Alethiometer is acquired we wanted the player to grasp [the] feeling that they now have this power at Lyra's disposal. The quest for questions and symbol meanings to create answers about the people, places and secrets of the world and the ability to use those answers to further Lyra's goals is a considerable challenging design task. The attempt to do this task and still be true to the universe is even more challenging but extremely necessary in providing the content that a game set in a world such as this deserves." He also revealed the two areas in the game not seen in the film (the Witches Consul and the prison in Svalbard) had received very positive feedback from the film's director Chris Weitz.

The game was completed before the later editing the film received, therefore the Bolvangar sequences occurred before Svalbard (as in the original book) while Nonso Anozie provides the voice of Iorek Byrnison, rather than Ian McKellen, who replaced him in post-production.

=== Music ===
The game's score was composed by Jamie Christopherson. He stated on his website, "I wrote and recorded the score to this game within about a month's time, before the score for the movie was even complete, so the music is completely original. Given the grand scope of the game, the music was recorded with a full orchestra at Warner Brothers Studios in LA. We finished the music just 2 days before my wife gave birth to our daughter, and I think that "Lyra's Theme" was in some ways inspired by that fact." In an interview with IGN, Christopherson stated

It was apparent from the beginning that the game would require a completely original approach. I didn't try to guess what the film music might sound like, but instead treated this game as a completely different entity, which would require a unique voice separate from the film. The producers of the game hired me to write a score based on my own style, and really left a lot of musical choices up to my own personal tastes. In that regard, this score allowed me a lot more creative freedom than most of the other games based on films that I've worked on. It was really no different than working on any other original project.

As soon as he was hired, Christopherson was shown footage from the game;

Since I was brought onto the project at a very late date, all of the major animation was already completed. I was fortunate on this game to get video capture for every element of the game, which allowed me to really dive deeply into the characters and setting. The artwork and video footage that I had to work with were pretty polished, so it was easy to get inspiration from those. Often I am only given a few early screenshots and descriptions of the characters and levels, which is great, but kind of like writing music for a film that hasn't been shot yet.

Christopherson concentrated on character themes and themes evoking a "feeling of place";

When traveling through the game, the player has the option of assuming control over either Lyra or Iorek. The music constantly changes in a subtle way to reflect which character the player is controlling or what location they are in. Sometimes Lyra will be in a frigid environment, and the music will play her theme but with instrumentation and harmonies that evoke a feeling of place. Because the story takes place in a vast number of locations, the music really has a great spectrum of colors.

The score was nominated for two awards at the 2008 G.A.N.G (Game Audio Network Guild) Awards; "Music of the Year" (won by BioShock), and the "Main Menu Theme" for "Best Original Instrumental Song" (won by "Welcome To Rapture" from BioShock).

== Reception ==
Reception

Aggregate score
Aggregator	Score						
Aggregator	DS	PC	PS2	PS3	PSP	Wii	Xbox 360
Metacritic	43/100	26/100	46/100	40/100	28/100	35/100	41/100

Review scores
Publication	Score						
Publication	DS	PC	PS2	PS3	PSP	Wii	Xbox 360
Eurogamer							3/10
GameRevolution		F					
GameSpot			4.5/10	4.5/10	2/10	4/10	4.5/10
GameSpy				1.5/5		1.5/5	1.5/5
IGN	4/10	3.5/10	4.5/10	3.5/10	3.5/10	3.5/10	3.5/10
PlayStation Official Magazine – UK			3/5				
Official U.S. PlayStation Magazine				2/5			
Official Xbox Magazine (US)							6/10
PC Gamer (UK)		23%					

The Golden Compass received "generally unfavorable reviews" across every platform; on Metacritic, the DS version holds an aggregate score of 43 out of 100, based on seven reviews; the PC version 26 out of 100, based on six reviews; the PlayStation 2 version 46 out of 100, based on ten reviews; the PlayStation 3 version 40 out of 100, based on seventeen reviews; the PlayStation Portable version 28 out of 100, based on four reviews; the Xbox 360 version 41 out of 100, based on twenty-five reviews; and the Wii version 35 out of 100, based on twelve reviews.

GameSpot's Kevin VanOrd rated the PlayStation 2, PlayStation 3 and Xbox 360 versions 4.5 out of 10, the Wii version 4 out of 10, and the PSP version 2 out of 10. He called the PlayStation 3 and Xbox 360 versions "a muddled mishmash of gameplay ideas that lacks focus and certainly lacks any sense of fun." He criticized the Wii version for failing to utilize the Wii Remote; "Shiny wasted a good number of opportunities to use the Wii's motion-sensing capabilities [...] for the most part, minigames are performed using buttons and the analog stick, leaving the platform's unique potential woefully unused." Of the PlayStation Portable version, he stated "it suffers from incomprehensibly awful glitches that essentially break the game [...] there are four- or five-second loading times in the middle of nowhere, accompanied by the furious whir of the disc. This can happen midjump or midattack, and rather than just freeze the onscreen view, the game cuts away to a black screen with a loading symbol. This occurs every minute or two during action sequences." Of the game in general, he was highly critical of the plot, arguing that if players were unfamiliar with either the novel or the film, they would not be able to follow what is happening. He also criticized the controls and camera, especially during the platforming levels; "Not only do the slippery controls make Lyra a pain to maneuver, but you can't manually control the camera, which makes it impossible to judge distance. Even worse, the camera has a tendency to move on its own in the middle of jumps and balancing acts."

IGN's Martin Robinson rated the PlayStation 2 version 4.5 out of 10, the DS version 4 out of 10, and the PlayStation 3, PlayStation Portable, Wii and Xbox 360 versions 3.5 out of 10. He was heavily critical of the deception and evasion minigames, and although he thought the Alethiometer gameplay was interesting, he felt its almost wholly optional nature in the game undermined it. He was most critical, however, of the plot; "The story is a mess standing on its own [...] The game makes little attempt to portray Pullman's world, instead opting to magpie scenes from the film and career through the story with little concession for the player." Ryan Clements rated the PC version 3.5 out of 10 arguing "the game is all over the place and pretty much does nothing well." As with Robinson, he was highly critical of the plot, which he argued was incomprehensible unless the player was familiar with the novel or the film. He concluded, "Besides lousy gameplay, The Golden Compass has little else worth mentioning. The graphics, regardless of which system you play on, don't push the hardware at all. The sound is almost never properly synchronized with what's happening on the screen, and the overall presentation is embarrassingly cheap."

Eurogamer's Simon Parkin scored the Xbox 360 version 3 out of 10. He was critical of the graphics; "Character models lack texture detail, animations stutter and fail to flow into one another seamlessly, collision detection is fuzzy and the environments are relentlessly bare and uninteresting." He concluded that "The Golden Compass feels like an unfinished title. Chapters are disjointed and the attempts at narrative segues between scenes and tasks are a mess. Added to this is a litany of niggles and flaws that reveal how rushed the game actually was: levitating puddles, character's lips that fail to move when they are talking, lines of dialogue that clip [...] The ideas aren't all bad and on paper this must have sounded like a rich and promising game. However, the game far overreaches itself and the coding, visuals and execution of those ideas is comprehensively unpolished."

Game Revolution's Geoff Hunt gave the PC version an F, arguing the mixing of gameplay styles did not work; "The essential problem with The Golden Compass is that there are tons of little gameplay mechanisms involved and none feel like they were ever completed." He was critical of the controls, the camera and the graphics; "Laughably bad animations coupled with low visual fidelity across the board makes for a worthless visual experience. Worse, the game has some distinct visual errors, such as geometry edges and the occasional chunk of flashing polygon."

GameSpy's Elisa Di Fiore rated the PlayStation 3, Xbox 360 and Wii versions 1.5 out of 5, calling it "one of the worst licensed games of the last few years." She too was critical of the narrative, arguing that unless one was familiar with the source material, it was impossible to follow. Like many other reviewers, she was also critical of the controls and the camera.

=== Sales ===
The Golden Compass sold well, and ranked number 10 in the UK's all formats games sales chart of 2007. As of 2008, it has sold a combined 2.28 million copies across all platforms.
