= The Book of Dust =

Fantasy novel trilogy by Philip Pullman

- First volume cover
- La Belle Sauvage (2017); The Secret Commonwealth (2019); The Rose Field (2025)
- Author: Philip Pullman
- Country: United Kingdom
- Language: English
- Genre: Fantasy novel
- Publisher: Scholastic
- Published: 2017–2025
- Media type: Print (hardback & paperback)

The Book of Dust is a trilogy of fantasy novels by Philip Pullman, which expands his trilogy His Dark Materials. The books further chronicle the adventures of Lyra Belacqua and her battle against the theocratic organisation known as the Magisterium, and shed more light on the mysterious substance called Dust.

The first book, La Belle Sauvage, was published in October 2017, and is set 12 years before Northern Lights (The Golden Compass in some countries). It describes how the 11-year-old Malcolm Polstead and the 15-year-old Alice protect the infant Lyra, leading to her being in the care of Jordan College. It introduces the research by academics and other free-thinkers into Dust, a mysterious subatomic particle related to consciousness, and the origins of Lyra's alethiometer.

The second book, The Secret Commonwealth, was published on 3 October 2019 and is set after the events in the original trilogy with Lyra now a twenty-year-old undergraduate. The third book of the series, The Rose Field, was published on 23 October 2025 and is set immediately after the conclusion of The Secret Commonwealth.

Pullman has said that the trilogy addresses consciousness: "Perhaps the oldest philosophical question of all: are we matter? Or are we spirit and matter? What is consciousness if there is no spirit? Questions like that are of perennial fascination and they haven't been solved yet, thank goodness." He added that the series might be slightly darker than the original, and quipped that it could alternatively be titled "His Darker Materials".

== History of the trilogy ==
Pullman conceived The Book of Dust before the publication of Lyra's Oxford in 2003 and in 2005 he confirmed the book was "under way". Early on he described it as being a longer book than he had initially imagined and later that he was considering writing two volumes, one set before His Dark Materials and the other set afterwards. In 2017 Pullman stated that The Book of Dust would be a new trilogy, and announced the publication of the first part, La Belle Sauvage, published on 19 October 2017. The books are jointly published by Random House Children's and David Fickling Books in the United Kingdom, and by Random House Children's Books in the US.

== Books ==
The Book of Dust takes place before and after the original trilogy; Pullman described it as an "equel", rather than a sequel, which "will begin and end with Lyra". In Pullman's words the story's main focus is: "the struggle between a despotic and totalitarian organisation, which wants to stifle speculation and enquiry, and those who believe thought and speech should be free". The books will touch on research into Dust, the cosmic matter that governs consciousness. Pullman said the trilogy addresses consciousness: "Perhaps the oldest philosophical question of all: are we matter? Or are we spirit and matter? What is consciousness if there is no spirit? Questions like that are of perennial fascination and they haven't been solved yet, thank goodness."

=== La Belle Sauvage ===
The first book, La Belle Sauvage, was published in October 2017, and is set around 11 years before Northern Lights. It describes how the 11-year-old Malcolm Polstead and the 15-year-old Alice protect the infant Lyra; leading to her being in the care of Jordan College. It introduces the research by academics and other free-thinkers into Dust, a mysterious subatomic particle related to consciousness, and the origins of Lyra's alethiometer.

=== The Secret Commonwealth ===
The second volume, The Secret Commonwealth, was published on 3 October 2019, and begins with Lyra as a 20-year-old undergraduate. It involves her journeying to the Far East via the Levant. The Secret Commonwealth takes its title from a compilation of folklore by Robert Kirk that Pullman has said is one of his favourite books.

=== The Rose Field ===
During a launch event for The Secret Commonwealth in October 2019, Pullman said, "We can see where the story is going in this book. It's going towards Central Asia, it involves roses and it involves Dust. That's all I can tell you—I don't even have a title for it yet!" though he had earlier mentioned possible titles such as The Garden of Roses or Roses from the South. A short excerpt of the first chapter is available as part of an interview on the blog of Goldsmiths, University of London.

On 11 February 2023, Pullman said on Twitter that he had written 350 pages of the book. In November 2023, Pullman announced that he had written 500 pages of a 540-page novel which would conclude the trilogy. He added that it would be published sometime in 2024, though he had yet to decide on a title. In mid-August 2024, Pullman said on Twitter that the book was finished, but that it still needed to be edited. At the end of January 2025, Pullman confirmed on Twitter that the book was finished and that he "very much hope[d] that it'll be published this year".

On 29 April 2025 the book's title The Rose Field was announced on Pullman's Instagram channel and the publication date set for 23 October 2025.

== Adaptations ==
The first book was adapted into a play of the same name by Bryony Lavery, a production of which, directed by Nicholas Hytner, played at the Bridge Theatre between November 2021 and February 2022 and which was broadcast by National Theatre Live on 17 February 2022.
