= Emilia Morosan =

Romanian-American physicist

Emilia Morosan (also Moroșan, born 1976) is a Romanian-American condensed matter physicist whose research involves the synthesis of quantum materials, including quantum criticality and unconventional superconductors. She is also known for her discovery of super-strong titanium gold alloys. She is a professor at Rice University.

== Education and career ==
Morosan was born in 1976 in Suceava, and studied physics at Alexandru Ioan Cuza University in Iași, Romania, earning a bachelor's degree in 1999. She completed a Ph.D. in physics and astronomy at Iowa State University in 2005. Her doctoral dissertation, Field-induced magnetic phase transitions and correlated electronic states in the hexagonal RAgGe and RPtIn series, was supervised by Paul C. Canfield.

After postdoctoral research in chemistry at Princeton University, Morosan joined Rice University in 2007, as an assistant professor with a joint appointment in the Department of Chemistry and the Department of Physics and Astronomy, her primary affiliation. She was promoted to associate professor in 2013, adding another affiliation in the Department of Materials Science and Nanoengineering. Her promotion to full professor in 2015 added a fourth affiliation, in the Department of Electrical and Chemical Engineering. She is also a member of the Rice Center for Quantum Materials.

== Recognition ==
Morosan was a 2009 recipient of the Presidential Early Career Awards for Scientists and Engineers. She was named as a Fellow of the American Physical Society (APS) in 2018, after a nomination from the APS Division of Condensed Matter Physics, "for experimental contributions to the understanding of correlated magnetic and superconducting materials, through the synthesis and study of unconventional magnetic systems, heavy fermion compounds and superconductors". She is also an Alexander von Humboldt fellow and a National Academy of Sciences Kavli Frontiers Fellow.
