= La Belle Sauvage =

2017 fantasy novel by Philip Pullman

- First edition cover
- Author: Philip Pullman
- Language: English
- Series: The Book of Dust
- Release number: 1
- Genre: Fantasy
- Publisher: David Fickling Books (UK)
- Publication date: 19 October 2017
- Publication place: United Kingdom
- Media type: Print (hardback)
- Pages: 560 (UK)
- ISBN: 978-0-385-60441-3
- Dewey Decimal: [Fic] 22
- Followed by: The Secret Commonwealth

La Belle Sauvage is a fantasy novel by Philip Pullman published in 2017. It is the first volume of a trilogy titled The Book of Dust and is set twelve years before Pullman's His Dark Materials. It presents events prior to the arrival of the six-month-old Lyra Belacqua at Jordan College, Oxford.

== Setting ==
The setting is a world dominated by the Magisterium (commonly called "the Church"), an international theocracy which actively suppresses heresy. In this world, humans' souls naturally exist outside of their bodies in the form of sentient "dæmons" in animal form which accompany, aid, and comfort their humans. An important plot device is the alethiometer, or symbol reader, of which just six are known to exist in this world. By setting three of the alethiometer's hands to point to symbols around a dial a skilled practitioner can pose questions, which are answered by the movement around the dial of a fourth hand.

== Plot ==
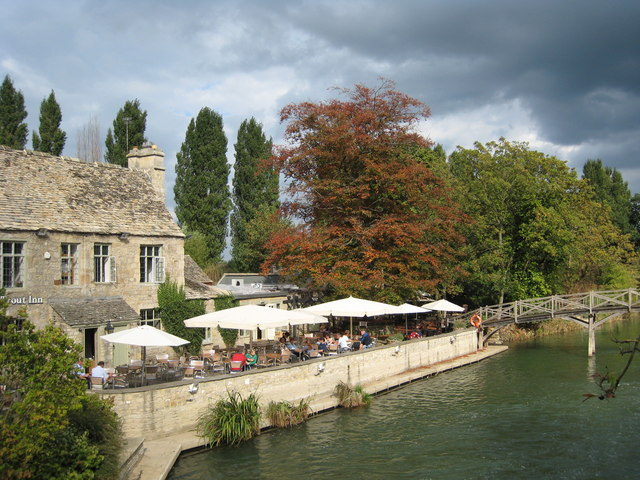
The Trout Inn—a fictional version of which features in the book

Eleven-year-old Malcolm Polstead and his dæmon Asta live three miles from Oxford. Malcolm works alongside fifteen-year-old Alice in his parents' inn, The Trout, close to the Priory of St. Rosamund where Malcolm helps the nuns with maintenance and cooking. One day, three men, led by the former Lord Chancellor, Lord Nugent, arrive at the inn and question Malcolm about the priory. Shortly afterwards, an infant aged around six months named Lyra arrives in the care of the nuns.

Walking near the river, Malcolm sees a failed attempt at a dead drop and finds a secret message. The intended recipient is Hannah, an Oxford academic specialising in the alethiometer who is secretly helping an organisation known as "Oakley Street" in its fight against the theocratic extremism of the Magisterium. Using the alethiometer Hannah finds Malcolm and retrieves her message. The two strike up a friendship in which Malcolm assists her intelligence-gathering and she provides him with books to read from her own library.

The Magisterium's influence grows. At Malcolm's school, students are encouraged to join the League of St. Alexander, and to report anybody—including teachers—who contradict the Magisterium's religious views. Coram van Texel, also working for Oakley Street, is investigating the activities of Marisa Coulter in Sweden. He discovers that she is looking into the Rusakov field and has asked an alethiometrist to find her daughter Lyra's location. Coram is followed by a man with a malevolent hyena dæmon and fights him, badly wounding the dæmon's front leg. Lyra's father, Lord Asriel, visits the inn and Malcolm takes him to visit Lyra. To escape his pursuers Asriel borrows Malcolm's canoe, La Belle Sauvage. As a token of thanks, he returns it significantly improved. Coram warns Malcolm of an impending flood, but Malcolm is unable to convince people to act. A man named Gerard Bonneville arrives at the inn, accompanied by a three-legged hyena dæmon, and Malcolm sees him snooping around the priory.

Heavy rain starts to fall. Alice warns Malcolm about Bonneville, whom they see trying to take the baby Lyra. As the flood arrives, Malcolm and Alice rescue the child and escape down river in La Belle Sauvage. They intend to stop at Jordan College to seek academic sanctuary for Lyra, but are prevented by the ferocity of the floodwaters. Instead, they head to London, where Lord Asriel lives, pursued by Bonneville; both Oakley Street and the Magisterium are also searching for them. They narrowly escape from Bonneville when Malcolm stabs him in the thigh and Alice shoots his dæmon, shattering her other leg. They take his heavy backpack. Shortly afterwards, they meet George Boatwright, a former patron of The Trout who has been in hiding with a small community since offending the Church. Their arrival is reported to The League of St. Alexander, and Lyra is captured and taken to an orphanage run by a convent. Malcolm enters through the scullery and rescues her.

The children continue their journey in the canoe. A fairy woman named Diania gives them food and feeds Lyra, whom she claims and intends to keep. In Bonneville's pack, they find his scientific papers describing the Rusakov field and an alethiometer in a puzzle box. They use the box to help them escape by tricking Diania and winning a challenge to keep Lyra. Later, they find themselves in an elegant garden where a party is being held. Behind a wall of mist nearby are all the things the partygoers wish to forget. Their onward passage is blocked by a pair of massive lock gates controlled by a river giant. Pretending to have authorisation from the King, they persuade the giant to open the gates. The canoe ends up at a mausoleum, where Bonneville attacks again and is killed by Malcolm.

Alice, Malcolm, and Lyra finally make it to London, closely followed by the forces of the Magisterium. Lord Nugent and Lord Asriel rescue them from La Belle Sauvage, which is breaking up, and Lord Asriel takes them by gyrocopter to Jordan College where he obtains academic sanctuary for Lyra and leaves her in the care of the Master. Malcolm secretly places Bonneville's alethiometer with Lyra's possessions.

== Publication history ==
Pullman conceived The Book of Dust before the publication of Lyra's Oxford in 2003, originally as a single volume. Writing was under way by 2005, but by 2011 Pullman said that he was considering splitting the novel into two volumes, one set before His Dark Materials and the other set afterwards. In February 2017, Pullman announced that The Book of Dust had become a 'companion' trilogy.

Prior to publication it had been announced that The Book of Dust was to be published by Random House Children's Books and David Fickling Books in the UK, and by Random House Children's Books in the US. La Belle Sauvage was ultimately released on 19 October 2017 by David Fickling Books in the UK, and by Alfred A. Knopf in the US.

== Reception ==
The novel received positive reviews. Marina Warner writing in The Guardian described it as "worth the wait", calling it "old-fashioned and comfy". The Independent said that "La Belle Sauvage has the feel of an extended preface; thrillingly entertaining and beautifully written, but ultimately something of an introduction to the story proper we know follows thereafter". The Washington Post was extremely positive, stating that "too few things in our own world are worth a 17-year-wait: The Book of Dust is one of them". The A.V. Club said that "even without the deep well of context of those other books of Dust, La Belle Sauvage stands on its own as a singularly beguiling work of fantasy. It's sure to be devoured by readers young and old alike".

The New York Times took issue with flat dialogue and pacing but said that "even with its longueurs, the book is full of wonder." The Spectator said that "as a tale of flight and pursuit, it's altogether enjoyable," but suggested that Pullman's larger aspiration—"to see off Christianity"—was an impediment to his storytelling and that the metaphysical ideas around which the narrative revolves were its least successful part.

== Adaptation ==
A stage adaptation of the novel by Bryony Lavery was scheduled to be performed at the Bridge Theatre London in July 2020 with Nicholas Hytner directing. Hytner had also directed the original National Theatre adaptation of His Dark Materials. The COVID-19 pandemic caused the closing of the theatre for most of 2020, and the production was postponed. The play opened on 7 December 2021, and closed on 26 February 2022.
