= The Secret Commonwealth =

2019 fantasy novel by Philip Pullman

- Author: Philip Pullman
- Language: English
- Series: The Book of Dust
- Release number: 2
- Genre: Fantasy
- Publisher: David Fickling Books
- Publication date: 3 October 2019
- Pages: 633
- ISBN: 9780241373330
- Preceded by: La Belle Sauvage
- Followed by: The Rose Field

The Secret Commonwealth is a 2019 fantasy novel by Philip Pullman, the second volume of his trilogy The Book of Dust. The story is set twenty years or so after the events of La Belle Sauvage and ten years after the conclusion of the His Dark Materials trilogy. Lyra Silvertongue is now an adult.

== Setting ==
The setting is a world dominated by the Magisterium, an international theocracy which actively suppresses heresy. In this world, humans' souls naturally exist outside of their bodies in the form of sapient "dæmons" in animal form which accompany, aid, and comfort their humans. An important plot device is the alethiometer, a truth-telling symbol reader.

== Plot ==
Lyra is a student at St Sophia's College Oxford, but still lives at Jordan College. Her rescuer of twenty years earlier in La Belle Sauvage, Malcolm Polstead, is now an academic.

Lyra has come to admire the works of two writers: Simon Talbot, a philosopher who asserts that rationality is all and that dæmons are a delusion; and the novelist Gottfried Brande who similarly denounces everything other than pure reason. Her dæmon Pantalaimon disapproves of both.

During a nightly excursion, Pan witnesses a man being murdered. A ticket inside the man's wallet leads them to a rucksack containing a journal and a notebook of addresses. The murdered man is Roderick Hassall, a botanist, and the journal that of his colleague Dr Strauss who had been studying a commercially-important rose whose oil is connected to Dust. Strauss keeps this information from the Magisterium, as they will certainly consider the rose industry to be heretical. The rose-growers' estates are being attacked by unknown "men from the mountains", and Strauss and Hassall decide to travel there.

The desert of Karamakan, where the industry is centred, is difficult to access and all visitors are forced to leave their dæmons behind. Strauss asks how people reunite afterwards, and is informed of a place inhabited by separated dæmons called "the Blue Hotel". The party reach a vast well-guarded red building, evidently of great importance. They are told that the price of entry is "a life", and Strauss is admitted. Hassall never sees him again, and returns home alone with Strauss's journal.

Jordan College's new master, a pharmaceutical executive, tells Lyra that she must give up her rooms. Agents from the Magisterium ransack them but fail to find the rucksack's contents.

Lyra and Pantalaimon have a blazing row. Pan insists that the books Lyra is reading have blinded her to the essential non-rational elements of life, while Lyra angrily scorns any appeal to emotion. Pan disappears, leaving a note saying "Gone to look for your imagination". Distraught, Lyra guesses that Pan may go to the Blue Hotel, and resolves to follow. Her old friends the gyptians arrange safe passage out of the country. Malcolm, meanwhile, is dispatched to Karamakan as an agent of the Oakley Street secret service organisation.

Marcel Delamare, Lyra's uncle and an ambitious Magisterium cardinal, learns that rose oil allows people to see Dust. He enlists the help of a young alethiometrist, Olivier Bonneville (son of Gerard Bonneville) to find Lyra, but Bonneville defies him and sets off without authority.

Covertly attending a Magisterium congress in Geneva, Malcolm speaks to the philosopher Simon Talbot, without realising he has been recognised. Using the congress as a pretext, Delamare seizes ultimate power for himself. Malcolm learns that the "men from the mountains" are funded by pharmaceutical companies intent on controlling the supply of rose oil.

Pantalaimon confronts the author Gottfried Brande at his home in Wittenberg, but is forced to leave when Brande pointedly ignores him. He is caught by Bonneville, but manages to escape when Bonneville is briefly arrested by Magisterium agents. Pan meets a young refugee named Nur Huda el-Wahabi who has lost her dæmon, and they travel together to the Blue Hotel.

Lyra journeys across Europe and the East, following the addresses in Hassall's notebook and aided by Oakley Street and a loose collective of people who have been separated from their own dæmons. In Smyrna, Lyra is helped to adopt a disguise, and Malcolm just misses her. He is shot in the hip by a Magisterium agent, but is able to continue with difficulty. Lyra is sexually assaulted by some soldiers as she takes a train to Seleukeia. On arrival, she hires a guide, Abdel Ionides, to take her through the desert to the isolated area of ruins known as the Blue Hotel.

Bonneville, who has been tracking Lyra, is about to shoot her when he is prevented by Ionides who advises him to "leave her alive for now" as she will be the key to a great treasure to be found three thousand miles to the East. Lyra is greeted by Nur Huda, who tells her that "we have been waiting for you." The novel ends "To be concluded..."

== Title ==
The "secret commonwealth" refers to things that are outside the realm of rational thought, such as ghosts, fairies, and superstition. Pullman took the title from a 17th-century book of the same name by the Scottish clergyman Robert Kirk, about encounters of country folk with supernatural creatures.

== Acknowledgements ==
At the end of the text, Pullman notes that three character names are those of real people: Bud Schlesinger, Alison Wetherfield, and Nur Huda el-Wahabi. El-Wahabi was one of the victims of the 2017 Grenfell Tower fire in London.

== Reception ==
The book was shortlisted for the 2020 Fiction Book of the Year in the British Book Awards.
