= Northern Lights (Pullman novel) =

1995 fantasy novel by Philip Pullman

- First edition
- Author: Philip Pullman
- Cover artist: David Scutt and Pullman
- Series: His Dark Materials
- Release number: 1
- Genre: Children's fantasy novel
- Publisher: Scholastic Point (UK), Alfred A. Knopf (US)
- Publication date: 9 July 1995
- Publication place: United Kingdom
- Media type: Print (hardback and paperback)
- Pages: 399
- ISBN: 0-590-54178-1
- OCLC: 37806360
- LC Class: PZ7.P968 No 1995; PZ7.P968 Go 1996
- Followed by: The Subtle Knife

Northern Lights (titled The Golden Compass in North America and some other countries) is a young-adult fantasy novel by Philip Pullman, published in 1995 by Scholastic UK. Set in a parallel universe, it follows the journey of Lyra Belacqua to the Arctic in search of her missing friend, Roger Parslow, and Lord Asriel, who has been conducting experiments with a mysterious substance known as "Dust".

Northern Lights is the first book of the trilogy His Dark Materials (1995–2000). Alfred A. Knopf published the first US edition in April 1996, under the name The Golden Compass, under which title it was adapted as a 2007 feature film and as a companion video game. The book has also been adapted as the first part of the 2019 TV series His Dark Materials.

Pullman won the 1995 Carnegie Medal from the Library Association, recognising the year's outstanding British children's book. For the 70th anniversary of the Medal, it was named one of the top ten winning works by a panel, composing the ballot for a public election of the all-time favourite. Northern Lights won the public vote from that shortlist and was thus named the all-time "Carnegie of Carnegies" on 21 June 2007.

== Setting ==
The setting is a world dominated by the Magisterium (commonly called "the Church"), an international theocracy which actively suppresses heresy. In this world, humans' souls naturally exist outside of their bodies in the form of sentient "dæmons" in animal form which accompany, aid, and comfort their humans. An important plot device is the alethiometer, a truth-telling symbol reader. By setting the alethiometer's hands to point to symbols around a dial a skilled practitioner can pose questions, which are answered by the movement of a further hand.

== Plot ==
Twelve-year-old Lyra Belacqua runs wild with her dæmon Pantalaimon around Jordan College, Oxford, under the guardianship of the college's Master. One day, she witnesses the Master poison wine intended for Lord Asriel. She warns Asriel, who she believes is her uncle, not to drink the wine, then spies on his lecture about "Dust", mysterious elementary particles attracted to adults more than to children. Asriel shows the college scholars images of a parallel universe seen through the Northern Lights amidst a concentration of Dust. The scholars agree to fund his controversial research, which is considered heretical by the oppressive Church.

Lyra's best friend Roger goes missing, presumed kidnapped by child abductors known as the "Gobblers". Mrs Coulter takes Lyra to her home in London, but before Lyra leaves Jordan, the Master entrusts her with an alethiometer, a strange truth-telling device, which she quickly learns to use intuitively. After several weeks, Lyra discovers that Coulter is the head of the Gobblers, or "General Oblation Board", a secret Church-funded project. Horrified, Lyra flees into London and is found by the Gyptians, canal-faring nomads, many of whose children have also been abducted. They reveal to Lyra that Asriel and Coulter are her parents.

The Gyptians form an expedition to the Arctic with Lyra, where they believe the Gobblers are holding their children. They stop in Trollesund, where Lyra meets Iorek Byrnison, the dispossessed royal heir of the panserbjørne (armoured bears). Lyra uses her alethiometer to locate Iorek's missing armour; in return, he and his human aeronaut friend, Lee Scoresby, join her group. She also learns that Lord Asriel has been exiled, guarded by the panserbjørne on Svalbard. Trollesund's witch consul tells the Gyptians of a prophecy about Lyra which she must not know, and that the witch clans are choosing sides for an upcoming war.

The search party continues towards Bolvangar, the Gobbler research station. Guided by the alethiometer, Lyra detours at a village and discovers an abandoned child who has been cut from his dæmon and who soon dies. She realises the Gobblers are experimenting on children by severing the bond between human and dæmon, a soul-splitting process called intercision. Lyra and her companions are attacked by bounty hunters, and Lyra is captured and taken to Bolvangar, where she is briefly reunited with Roger before being sent to be separated from Pantalaimon. Just before this can occur, Coulter arrives and halts the intercision process. She tells Lyra that intercision prevents the onset of troubling adult emotions, though it has not yet been perfected.

Lyra activates Bolvangar's emergency alarm, sets the station on fire, and evacuates the children, where they are rescued by Scoresby, Iorek, the Gyptians, and the witch clan of Serafina Pekkala, who battle the station attendants as Lyra, Roger, and Iorek flee in Scoresby's hot air balloon. Lyra directs the witches to tow the balloon towards Asriel in Svalbard, but she falls out and is taken by the panserbjørne to the castle of their usurping king, Iofur Raknison. She tricks Iofur into fighting Iorek, who arrives with Roger to rescue Lyra. Iorek kills Iofur and regains his place as the rightful king.

Lyra, Iorek, and Roger continue onwards to Svalbard, where Asriel has continued his Dust research in exile. He tells Lyra all he knows of Dust: that it has spawned parallel universes, it is somehow connected to death and misery, and that the Church believes it is the physical basis of sin. Lord Asriel travels with Roger through the snow, Lyra and Iorek follow using the tracks of Asriel's sled. Asriel ascends a mountain with Roger as Lyra and Iorek and his squadron of bears battle the witches that are allied with Asriel. Mrs Coulter and the Tartars arrive in a military airship and attack the bears. During the battle, Mrs Coulter follows Lyra to the top of the mountain, where Lord Asriel and Mrs Coulter embrace at the peak of the mountain where Asriel has set up his equipment. Suddenly, Lord Asriel severs Roger from his dæmon, killing Roger but releasing an enormous amount of energy that tears a hole in the Northern Lights into a parallel universe, through which he walks. Devastated, Lyra and Pantalaimon also pass through the opening in the sky.

== Characters ==
All humans in Northern Lights, as well as witches, have a dæmon (pronounced "demon"), which is the physical manifestation of a person's "inner being", soul, or spirit. It takes the form of a creature (such as a moth, bird, dog, monkey, or snake) and is usually the opposite sex to its human counterpart. The dæmons of children have the ability to change form from one creature to another. However, near the end of a child's puberty, their dæmon "settles" into a permanent form, which reflects the person's personality. When a person dies, the dæmon dies too. Armoured bears, cliff ghasts and other creatures do not have dæmons. An armoured bear's armour is his soul.

- Lyra Belacqua and Pantalaimon: The principal characters. Lyra is described as having blue eyes and blond hair, along with being short for her age and quite thin. She is also brave, curious, and crafty. Her dæmon is Pantalaimon, nicknamed Pan. Because Lyra is still a child, Pan is still capable of changing into any shape he wishes (often a brown moth, a wildcat, a white ermine, or a mouse).
- Roger Parslow: Lyra's friend, an orphan who works at Jordan College. When he is kidnapped and taken north, Lyra pursues him in hopes of rescuing him, meeting up with him again at Bolvangar.
- Lord Asriel: Ostensibly Lyra's uncle, he is actually her father. His dæmon is Stelmaria, a snow leopard.
- Marisa Coulter: An agent of the Magisterium, who does not hesitate to manipulate the Church. She is intelligent and beautiful, but also ruthless and callous. She is actually Lyra's mother and is unexpectedly kind to her. Her dæmon is a golden monkey who, unusually, is not named.
- Iorek Byrnison: Rightful king of the panserbjørne, armoured bears with human-level intelligence, Iorek has been tricked out of his armour and reduced to a slave of the human village Trollesund. After Lyra helps him recover his armour, he becomes very protective of her and joins the expedition to find the children seized by Gobblers.
- Iofur Raknison: A panserbjørn who has usurped Iorek Byrnison's authority as king.
- Serafina Pekkala: A witch who closely follows Lyra on her travels. She is aware of Lyra's destiny. Serafina's dæmon is Kaisa, a snow goose, who is capable of physically moving separately from Serafina over long distances, a quality that only witches' dæmons possess innately.
- Lee Scoresby: A Texan aeronaut who transports Lyra in his balloon. He and Iorek Byrnison are good friends and Lee comes to see Lyra as a surrogate daughter. His dæmon is Hester, an arctic snow hare.
- Ma Costa: A Gyptian woman whose son, Billy Costa has been abducted by the "Gobblers". She rescues Lyra from Mrs Coulter and takes her to John Faa.
- John Faa: The King of all Gyptian people. He travels with Lyra to the North with his companion Farder Coram.

== Title ==
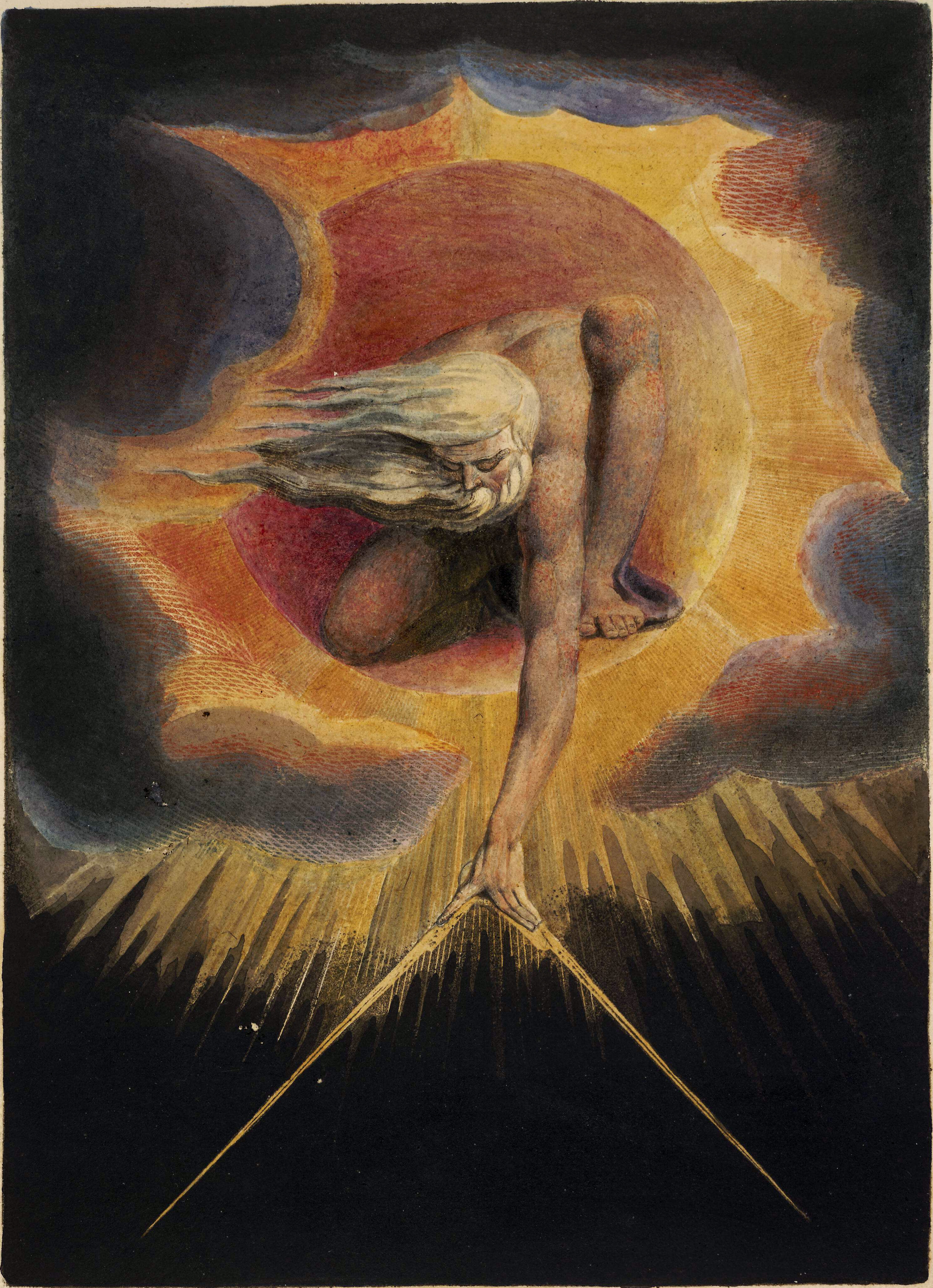
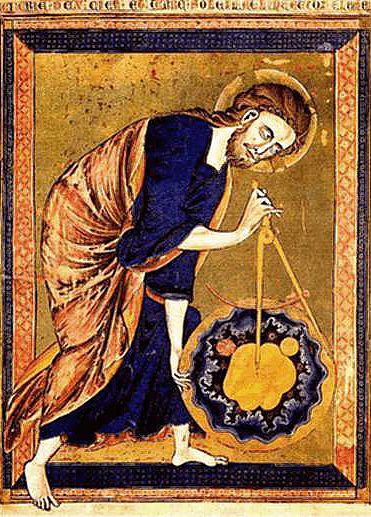

Left: God wielding the golden compasses, by William Blake. Right: Jesus as geometer in a 13th-century medieval illuminated manuscript of unknown authorship.

During pre-publication of the novel, the prospective trilogy was known in Britain as The Golden Compasses, an allusion to God's poetic delineation of the world. The term is from a line in Milton's Paradise Lost, where it denotes the drafting compass God used to establish and set a circular boundary of all creation:

Then staid the fervid wheels, and in his hand
He took the golden compasses, prepared
In God's eternal store, to circumscribe
This universe, and all created things:
One foot he centred, and the other turned
Round through the vast profundity obscure

— Book 7, lines 224–229

In the US, publisher Knopf had been calling the first book The Golden Compass (singular), which it mistakenly understood as a reference to Lyra's alethiometer (depicted on the front cover shown at the head of this article), because of the device's resemblance to a navigational compass. By the time Pullman had replaced The Golden Compasses with His Dark Materials as the name of the trilogy, the US publisher had become so attached to the original title that it insisted on publishing the first book as The Golden Compass rather than as Northern Lights, the title used in Britain and Australia.

== Critical reception ==
=== Awards ===
Pullman won both the annual Carnegie Medal for British children's books and the annual Guardian Children's Fiction Prize for Northern Lights, an award which authors can only win once in their lifetime. Six books have won both awards in 45 years through 2011. (Note: Alternatively, six authors have won the Carnegie Medal for their Guardian Prize-winning books. Professional librarians confer the Carnegie and select the winner from all British children's books. The Guardian newspaper's prize winner is selected by British children's writers, "peers" of the author who has not yet won it, for one children's (age 7+) or young-adult fiction book. The nationality of winning authors and publishers has varied.)

In the US, The Golden Compass was named Booklist Editors Choice – Top of the List, Publishers Weekly Book of the Year, a Horn Book Fanfare Honor Book, and a Bulletin Blue Ribbon Book in 1996.

=== Religion ===
Some critics have asserted that the trilogy and the movie portray organised churches and religion negatively, while others – notably Dr Rowan Williams, formerly Archbishop of Canterbury – have argued that Pullman's works should be included in religious-education courses. Journalist Peter Hitchens views the series His Dark Materials as a direct rebuttal of The Chronicles of Narnia by C. S. Lewis. Literary critic Alan Jacobs of Wheaton College in Illinois suggested that Pullman had recast the Narnia series, replacing a theist world-view with a Rousseauist one.

== Adaptations ==
New Line Cinema released a feature-film adaptation of the novel named The Golden Compass in December 2007. Chris Weitz adapted the novel and also directed the film. Dakota Blue Richards, in her film debut, played Lyra. The cast included Nicole Kidman, Daniel Craig, Eva Green, Ian McKellen, Sam Elliott, Derek Jacobi, and Christopher Lee.

In 1996 Natasha Richardson narrated an audiobook version of Northern Lights. The trilogy, His Dark Materials, was abridged in a dramatisation by BBC Worldwide, published on 1 January 2003. It was also adapted unabridged and released by BBC Audiobooks, narrated by Philip Pullman. The cast includes: Joanna Wyatt as Lyra, Alison Dowling as Mrs Coulter, Seán Barrett as Lord Asriel and Iorek Byrnison, and Stephen Thorne as the Master and Farder Coram. An audiobook version narrated by Pullman and featuring a full cast was released in 1999.

The National Theatre in London staged a two-part adaptation of the trilogy in 2003–2004.

Sega released a video game of the movie adaptation of the book, titled The Golden Compass and developed by Shiny Entertainment, on 4 December 2007. Players assume the role of Lyra as she travels through the frozen wastes of the North in an attempt to rescue her friend kidnapped by a mysterious organisation known as the Gobblers. Travelling with her are an armoured polar bear and her dæmon Pantalaimon (Pan). Together, they must use a truth-telling alethiometer and other items to explore the land and fight their way through confrontations to help Lyra's friend. The Golden Compass features a mix of fighting and puzzle-solving with three characters.

On 3 November 2019, BBC One began broadcast of their TV adaptation of His Dark Materials. This first series mainly covers events from Northern Lights. It premiered on HBO on 4 November 2019 in the United States. The series was produced by Bad Wolf and New Line Cinema and directed by Tom Hooper. Cast members included Dafne Keen, James McAvoy, Ruth Wilson, Lin-Manuel Miranda, Ian Gelder, and Ruta Gedmintas.

== See also ==
- His Dark Materials
- List of His Dark Materials and The Book of Dust characters
- Races and creatures in His Dark Materials
- Locations in His Dark Materials

== Notes ==
Awards
Preceded by Whispers in the Graveyard	Carnegie Medal recipient 1995	Succeeded by Junk
