= His Dark Materials =

Novel trilogy by Philip Pullman

- First combined edition (publ. Ted Smart, 2000)
- Northern Lights (1995); The Subtle Knife (1997); The Amber Spyglass (2000)
- Author: Philip Pullman
- Country: United Kingdom
- Language: English
- Genre: Fantasy novel, Steampunk
- Publisher: Scholastic
- Published: 1995–2000
- Media type: Print (hardback & paperback)
- Followed by: The Book of Dust

His Dark Materials is a trilogy of fantasy novels by Philip Pullman consisting of Northern Lights (1995; published as The Golden Compass in North America), The Subtle Knife (1997), and The Amber Spyglass (2000). It follows the coming of age of two children, Lyra Belacqua and Will Parry, as they wander through a series of parallel universes. The novels have won a number of awards, including the Carnegie Medal in 1995 for Northern Lights and the 2001 Whitbread Book of the Year for The Amber Spyglass. In 2003, the trilogy was ranked third on the BBC's The Big Read poll.

Although His Dark Materials has been marketed as young adult fiction, and the central characters are children, Pullman wrote with no target audience in mind. The fantasy elements include witches and armoured polar bears; the trilogy also alludes to concepts from physics, philosophy, and theology. It functions in part as a retelling and inversion of John Milton's epic Paradise Lost, in which Pullman commends humanity for what Milton saw as its most tragic failing, original sin. The trilogy has attracted controversy for its criticism of religion. By 2024, more than 22 million copies of the novels had been sold in 50 countries, and they had been translated into 40 languages.

The books have been dramatised several times. BBC Radio 4 produced a three-part full-cast dramatisation in 2003, as did RTÉ the same year. The London Royal National Theatre staged a two-part adaptation of the trilogy in 2003–2004. New Line Cinema released a film adaptation of Northern Lights, The Golden Compass, in 2007. A television series, based on the trilogy and produced by Bad Wolf, was broadcast by the BBC and HBO between November 2019 and February 2023.

Pullman followed the trilogy with four short works set in the Northern Lights universe: Lyra's Oxford, (2003); Once Upon a Time in the North, (2008); The Collectors (2014); and the latest Serpentine, (2020). A new trilogy, also set in the same universe as Northern Lights, titled The Book of Dust, was published beginning 19 October 2017 with the release of the first novel La Belle Sauvage; the second book, The Secret Commonwealth, was released in October 2019; the final novel, The Rose Field, was published on 23 October 2025.

== Setting ==
The trilogy takes place across a multiverse, moving between many parallel worlds. In Northern Lights, the story takes place in a world with some similarities to our own: dress-style resembles that of the UK's Edwardian era; the technology does not include cars or fixed-wing aircraft, but zeppelins feature as a mode of transport.

The dominant religion has parallels with Christianity. The Church (governed by the "Magisterium", the same name as the authority of the Catholic Church) exerts a strong control over society and has some of the appearance and organisation of the Catholic Church, but in which the centre of power had been moved from Rome to Geneva by Pullman's fictional "Pope John Calvin" (Geneva was the home of the historical John Calvin).

In The Subtle Knife, the story moves between our own world, the world of the first novel, and a third world containing the city of Cittàgazze. In The Amber Spyglass, several other worlds appear alongside those three.

== Titles ==
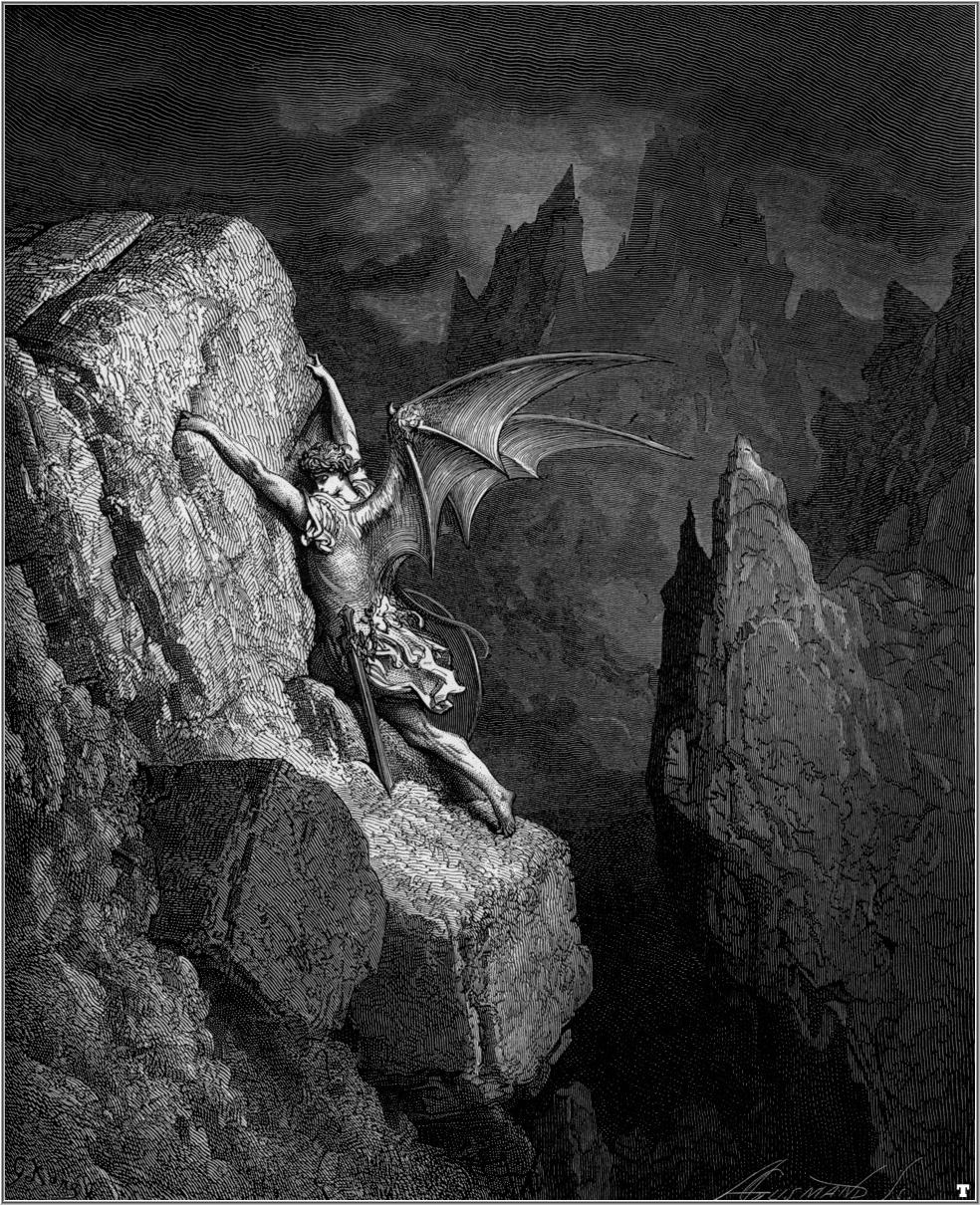
Satan struggling through the "wilde Abyss" separating Hell from Earth. Illustration by Gustave Doré for Milton's Paradise Lost

The title of the series comes from 17th-century poet John Milton's Paradise Lost:

Into this wilde Abyss,
The Womb of nature and perhaps her Grave,
Of neither Sea, nor Shore, nor Air, nor Fire,
But all these in their pregnant causes mixt
Confus'dly, and which thus must ever fight,
Unless th' Almighty Maker them ordain
His dark materials to create more Worlds,
Into this wilde Abyss the warie fiend
Stood on the brink of Hell and look'd a while,
Pondering his Voyage; for no narrow frith
He had to cross.

— Paradise Lost, Book 2, lines 910–920

Pullman chose this particular phrase from Milton because it echoed the dark matter of astrophysics.

Pullman earlier proposed to name the series The Golden Compasses, also a reference to Paradise Lost, where it denotes the pair of compasses with which God set the bounds of all creation:

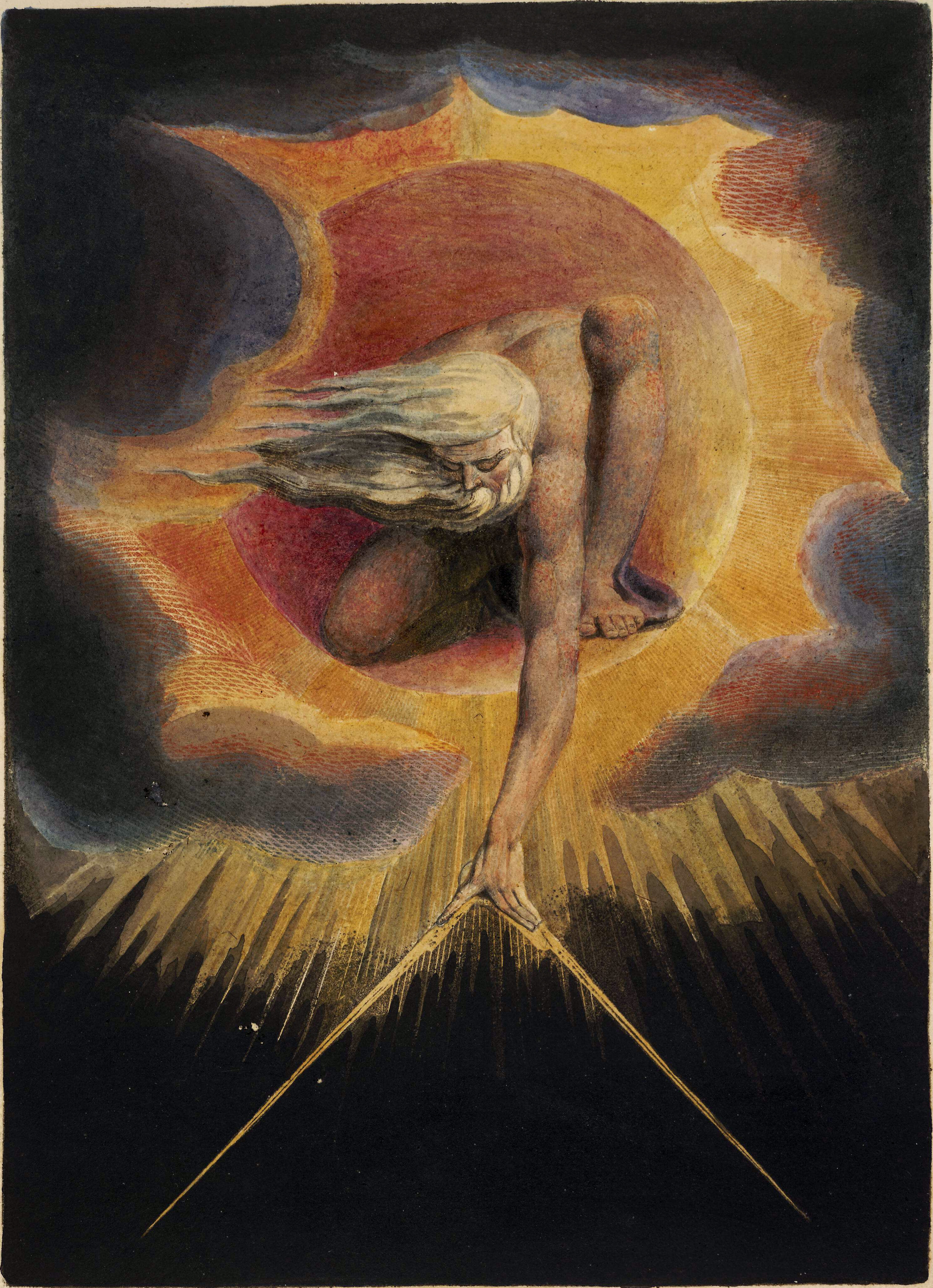
The Ancient of Days by William Blake, illustrating "golden compasses"

Then staid the fervid wheels, and in his hand
He took the golden compasses, prepared
In God's eternal store, to circumscribe
This universe, and all created things:
One foot he centred, and the other turned
Round through the vast profundity obscure...

— Paradise Lost, Book 7, lines 224–229

Although Pullman did not intend it as such, the American publishers interpreted this title as a reference to the alethiometer, a compass-like device that features prominently in the books. Pullman eventually settled on the titles His Dark Materials for the series and Northern Lights for the first book, but the American publishers disliked the latter title and chose to use The Golden Compass instead.

== Plot ==
=== Northern Lights (or The Golden Compass) ===
In Jordan College, Oxford, 11-year-old Lyra Belacqua and her dæmon Pantalaimon witness the Master attempt to poison Lord Asriel, Lyra's rebellious and adventuring uncle. She warns Asriel, then spies on his lecture about Dust, mysterious elementary particles. Lyra's friend Roger is kidnapped by child abductors known as Gobblers. Lyra is adopted by a charming socialite, Mrs Coulter. The Master secretly entrusts Lyra with an alethiometer, a truth-telling device. Lyra discovers that Mrs Coulter is the leader of the Gobblers, and that it is a project secretly funded by the Church. Lyra flees to the Gyptians, canal-faring nomads, whose children have also been abducted. They reveal to Lyra that Asriel and Mrs Coulter are actually her parents.

The Gyptians form an expedition to the Arctic with Lyra to rescue the children. Lyra recruits Iorek Byrnison, an armoured bear, and his human aeronaut friend, Lee Scoresby. She also learns that Lord Asriel has been exiled, guarded by the bears on Svalbard.

Near Bolvangar, the Gobbler research station, Lyra finds an abandoned child who has been cut from his dæmon; the Gobblers are experimenting on children by severing the bond between human and dæmon, a procedure called intercision.

Lyra is captured and taken to Bolvangar, where she is reunited with Roger. Mrs Coulter tells Lyra that the intercision prevents the onset of troubling adult emotions. Lyra and the children are rescued by Scoresby, Iorek, the Gyptians, and Serafina Pekkala's flying witch clan. Lyra falls out of Scoresby's balloon and is taken by the panserbjørne to the castle of their usurping king, Iofur Raknison. She tricks Iofur into fighting Iorek, who arrives with the others to rescue Lyra. Iorek kills Iofur and takes his place as the rightful king.

Lyra, Iorek, and Roger travel to Svalbard, where Asriel has continued his Dust research in exile. He tells Lyra that the Church believes Dust is the basis of sin, and plans to visit the other universes and destroy its source. He severs Roger from his dæmon, killing him and releasing enough energy to create an opening to a parallel universe. Lyra resolves to stop Asriel and discover the source of Dust for herself.

=== The Subtle Knife ===
Lyra journeys through Asriel's opening between worlds to Cittàgazze, a city whose denizens discovered a way to travel between worlds. Cittàgazze's reckless use of the technology has released Spectres which destroy adult souls but to which children are immune, rendering the world empty of adults. Here Lyra meets and befriends Will Parry, a twelve-year-old boy from our world's Oxford. Will, who recently killed a man to protect his ailing mother, has stumbled into Cittàgazze in an effort to locate his long-lost father. Venturing into Will's (our) world, Lyra meets Dr. Mary Malone, a physicist who is researching dark matter, which is analogous to Dust in Lyra's world. Lyra encourages Dr. Malone's attempts to communicate with the particles, and when the physicist does they tell her to travel into the Cittàgazze world. Lyra's alethiometer is stolen by Lord Boreal, alias Sir Charles Latrom, an ally of Mrs Coulter who has found a way to Will's Oxford and established a home there.

Will becomes the bearer of the Subtle Knife, a tool forged three hundred years before by Cittàgazze's scientists from the same alloy used to make the guillotine in Bolvangar. One edge of the knife can divide subatomic particles and form subtle divisions in space, creating portals between worlds; the other edge easily cuts through any form of matter. Using the knife's portal-creating powers, Will and Lyra are able to retrieve her alethiometer from Latrom's mansion in Will's world.

Meanwhile, in Lyra's world, Lee Scoresby seeks out the Arctic explorer Stanislaus Grumman, who years before entered Lyra's world through a portal in Alaska. Scoresby finds him living as a shaman under the name Jopari and he turns out to be Will's father, John Parry. Parry insists on being taken through the opening into the Cittàgazze world in Scoresby's balloon, since he has foreseen that he should meet the wielder of the Subtle Knife there. In that world, Scoresby dies defending Parry from the forces of the Church, while Parry succeeds in reuniting with his son moments before being murdered by Juta Kamainen, a witch whose love John had once rejected. After his father's death, Will discovers that Lyra has been kidnapped by Mrs Coulter, and he is approached by two angels requesting his aid.

=== The Amber Spyglass ===
At the beginning of The Amber Spyglass, Lyra has been kidnapped by her mother, Mrs Coulter, an agent of the Magisterium who has learned of the prophecy identifying Lyra as the next Eve. A pair of angels, Balthamos and Baruch, tell Will that he must travel with them to give the Subtle Knife to Lyra's father, Lord Asriel, as a weapon against The Authority. Will ignores the angels; with the help of a local girl named Ama, the Bear King Iorek Byrnison, and Lord Asriel's Gallivespian spies, the Chevalier Tialys and the Lady Salmakia, he rescues Lyra from the cave where her mother has hidden her from the Magisterium, which has become determined to kill her before she yields to temptation and sin like the original Eve.

Will, Lyra, Tialys and Salmakia journey to the Land of the Dead, temporarily parting with their dæmons to release the ghosts from their captivity. Mary Malone, a scientist from Will's world interested in "shadows" (or Dust in Lyra's world), travels to a land populated by strange sentient creatures called Mulefa. There, she comes to understand the true nature of Dust, which is both created by and nourishes life that has become self-aware. Lord Asriel and the reformed Mrs Coulter work to destroy the Authority's Regent Metatron. They succeed, but themselves suffer annihilation in the process by pulling Metatron into the abyss.

The Authority himself dies of his own frailty when Will and Lyra free him from the crystal prison wherein Metatron had trapped him, able to do so because an attack by cliff-ghasts kills or drives away the prison's protectors. When Will and Lyra emerge from the land of the dead, they find their dæmons.

The book ends with Will and Lyra falling in love but realising they cannot live together in the same world, because all windows – except one from the underworld to the world of the Mulefa – must be closed to prevent the loss of Dust. Additionally, with every window opening, a Spectre is created, so Will must never use the knife again. They must also be apart because both of them can only live full lives in their native worlds. During the return, Mary Malone learns how to see her own dæmon, who takes the form of a black Alpine chough. Lyra loses her ability to intuitively read the alethiometer and determines to learn how to use her conscious mind to achieve the same effect.

== Characters ==
All humans in Lyra's world, including witches, have a dæmon. It is the physical manifestation of a person's 'inner being', soul or spirit. It takes the form of a creature (moth, bird, dog, monkey, snake, etc.) and is usually the opposite sex to its human counterpart. The dæmons of children have the ability to change form - from one creature to another - but during a child's puberty, their dæmon "settles" into a permanent form, which reflects the person's personality. When a person dies, the dæmon dies too. Armoured bears, cliff ghasts, and other creatures do not have dæmons. An armoured bear's armour is his soul.

- Lyra Belacqua, a wild 12-year-old girl, has grown up in the fictional Jordan College, Oxford. She prides herself on her capacity for mischief, especially her ability to lie, earning her the epithet "Silvertongue" from Iorek Byrnison. Lyra has a natural ability to use the alethiometer, which is capable of answering any question when properly manipulated and read.
- Pantalaimon is Lyra's dæmon. Like all children's dæmons, he changes form from one creature to another frequently. When Lyra reaches puberty, he assumes the permanent form of a pine marten.
- Will Parry, a sensible, morally conscious, assertive 12-year-old boy from our world. He becomes the bearer of the subtle knife. Will is independent and responsible for his age, having looked after his mentally ill mother for several years. Will's dæmon is Kirjava.
- The Authority is the first angel to have emerged from Dust. He told the later-arriving angels that he created them and the universe, but this is a lie. Although he is the overarching antagonist of the series, the Authority remains in the background; he makes his only appearance late in The Amber Spyglass. The Authority has grown weak and transferred most of his powers to his regent, Metatron.
- Lord Asriel, ostensibly Lyra's uncle, is actually her father. He opens a rift between the worlds in his pursuit of Dust. His dream of establishing a Republic of Heaven leads him to use his power to raise a grand army from across the multiverse to rise up in rebellion against the forces of the Church.
- Marisa Coulter is the beautiful and manipulative mother of Lyra, and the former lover of Lord Asriel. She serves the Church by kidnapping children for research into the nature of Dust, in the course of which she separates them from their dæmons - a procedure known as intercision. Initially hostile to Lyra, she realises that she loves her daughter and seeks to protect her from agents of the Church who want to kill Lyra. Her dæmon is a golden monkey with a cruel streak.
- Metatron, Asriel's principal adversary, was a human, Enoch, in biblical times, but was later transfigured into an angel. The Authority, his health declining, appointed Metatron his Regent. As Regent, Metatron has implanted the monotheistic religions across the universes.
- Lord Carlo Boreal - or Sir Charles Latrom, CBE, as he is known as in Will Parry's world-is a minor character in Northern Lights, but the main antagonist in The Subtle Knife. He is an old Englishman, appearing to be in his sixties.
- Mary Malone, is a physicist and former nun from Will's world. She meets Lyra during Lyra's first visit to Will's world. Lyra provides Mary with insight into the nature of Dust. Agents of the Church force Mary to flee to the world of the Mulefa. There she constructs the amber spyglass, which enables her to see the otherwise invisible Dust. Her purpose is to learn why Dust, which Mulefa civilisation depends on, is flowing out of the universe.
- Iorek Byrnison is a massive armoured bear. An armoured bear's armour is his soul. Iorek's armour is stolen, so he becomes despondent. With Lyra's help he regains his armour, his dignity, and his kingship over the armoured bears. In gratitude, and impressed by her cunning, he dubs her "Lyra Silvertongue". A powerful warrior and blacksmith, Iorek repairs the Subtle Knife when it shatters. He later goes to war against The Authority and Metatron.
- Lee Scoresby, a rangy Texan, is a balloonist. He helps Lyra in an early quest to reach Asriel's residence in the North, and he later helps John Parry reunite with his son Will.
- Serafina Pekkala is the beautiful queen of a clan of Northern witches. Her snow-goose dæmon Kaisa, like all witches' dæmons, can travel much farther apart from her than the dæmons of humans, without feeling the pain of separation.
- The Master of Jordan heads Jordan College, part of Oxford University in Lyra's world. Helped by other Jordan College employees, he is raising the supposedly orphaned Lyra. Faced with difficult choices that only later become apparent, he tries unsuccessfully to poison Lord Asriel.
- Roger Parslow is the kitchen boy at Jordan College and Lyra's best friend.
- John Parry is Will's father. He is an explorer from our world who discovered a portal to Lyra's world and became the shaman known as Stanislaus Grumman or Jopari, a variation of his original name.
- The Four Gallivespians—Lord Roke, Madame Oxentiel, Chevalier Tialys, and Lady Salmakia—are tiny people (a hand-span tall) with poisonous heel spurs.
- Ma Costa: A Gyptian woman whose son, Billy Costa, is abducted by the Gobblers. She rescues Lyra from Mrs Coulter and takes her to John Faa. Ma Costa nursed Lyra when she was a baby.
- John Faa: The King of all the Gyptians. He journeys with Lyra to the North with his companion Farder Coram. Faa and Costa rescue Lyra when she runs away from Mrs Coulter. Then they take her to Iorek Byrnison.
- Father Gomez is a priest sent by the Church to assassinate Lyra.
- Fra Pavel Rašek is an alethiometrist of the Consistorial Court of Discipline, but a sluggish reader of the device.
- Balthamos is a rebel angel who, with his lover Baruch, join in Will's journey to find the captured Lyra. Near the end of the story, he saves their lives by killing Father Gomez.
- Mulefa are four-legged wheeled animals; they have one leg in front, one in back, and one on each side. Their "wheels" are large, round, hard seed-pods from trees; an axle-like claw at the end of each leg grips a seed-pod.

== Dæmons ==
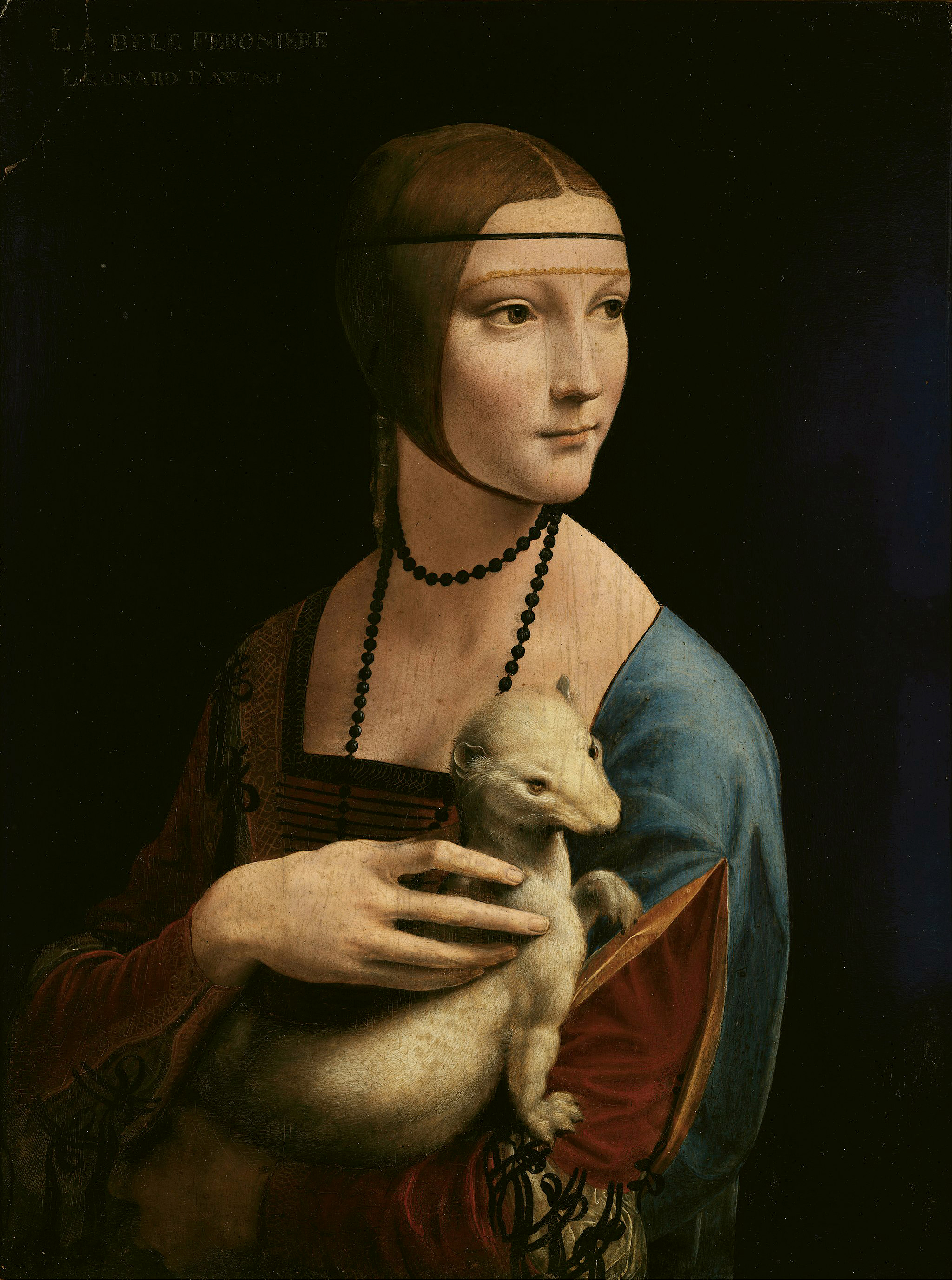
Leonardo da Vinci's Lady with an Ermine (1489–90), along with two portraits by Giovanni Battista Tiepolo and Hans Holbein the Younger, helped inspire Pullman's "dæmon" concept.

One distinctive aspect of Pullman's story is the presence of "dæmons" (pronounced "demon"). In the birth-universe of the story's protagonist Lyra Belacqua, a human individual's inner-self manifests itself throughout life as an animal-shaped "dæmon" that almost always stays near its human counterpart. During the childhood of its associated human, a dæmon can change its animal shape at will, but with the onset of adolescence it settles into a fixed, final animal form.

== Influences ==
Pullman has identified three major literary influences on His Dark Materials: the essay On the Marionette Theatre by Heinrich von Kleist, the works of William Blake, and, most important, John Milton's Paradise Lost, from which the trilogy derives its title. In his introduction, he adapts a famous description of Milton by Blake to quip that he (Pullman) "is of the Devil's party and does know it".

Critics have compared the trilogy with C. S. Lewis's The Chronicles of Narnia, which Pullman despises, and also with such fantasy books as Bridge to Terabithia by Katherine Paterson and A Wrinkle in Time by Madeleine L'Engle.

== Awards and recognition ==
The first volume, Northern Lights, won the Carnegie Medal for children's fiction in the UK in 1995. In 2007, the judges of the CILIP Carnegie Medal for children's literature selected it as one of the ten most important children's novels of the previous 70 years. In an online June 2007 poll, it was voted the best Carnegie Medal winner in the 70-year history of the award, the Carnegie of Carnegies. The Amber Spyglass won the 2001 Whitbread Book of the Year award, the first time that such an award has been bestowed on a book from their "children's literature" category.

The trilogy came third in the 2003 BBC's Big Read, a national poll of viewers' favourite books, after The Lord of the Rings and Pride and Prejudice.

On 19 May 2005, Pullman attended the British Library in London to receive formal congratulations for his work from culture secretary Tessa Jowell "on behalf of the government". On 25 May 2005, Pullman received the Swedish government's Astrid Lindgren Memorial Award for children's and youth literature (sharing it with Japanese illustrator Ryōji Arai). Swedes regard this prize as second only to the Nobel Prize in Literature; it has a value of 5 million Swedish Kronor or approximately £385,000. In 2008, The Observer cites Northern Lights as one of the 100 best novels. Time magazine in the US included Northern Lights (The Golden Compass) in its list of the 100 Best Young-Adult Books of All Time. In November 2019, the BBC listed His Dark Materials on its list of the 100 most influential novels.

== Criticism by Christians ==
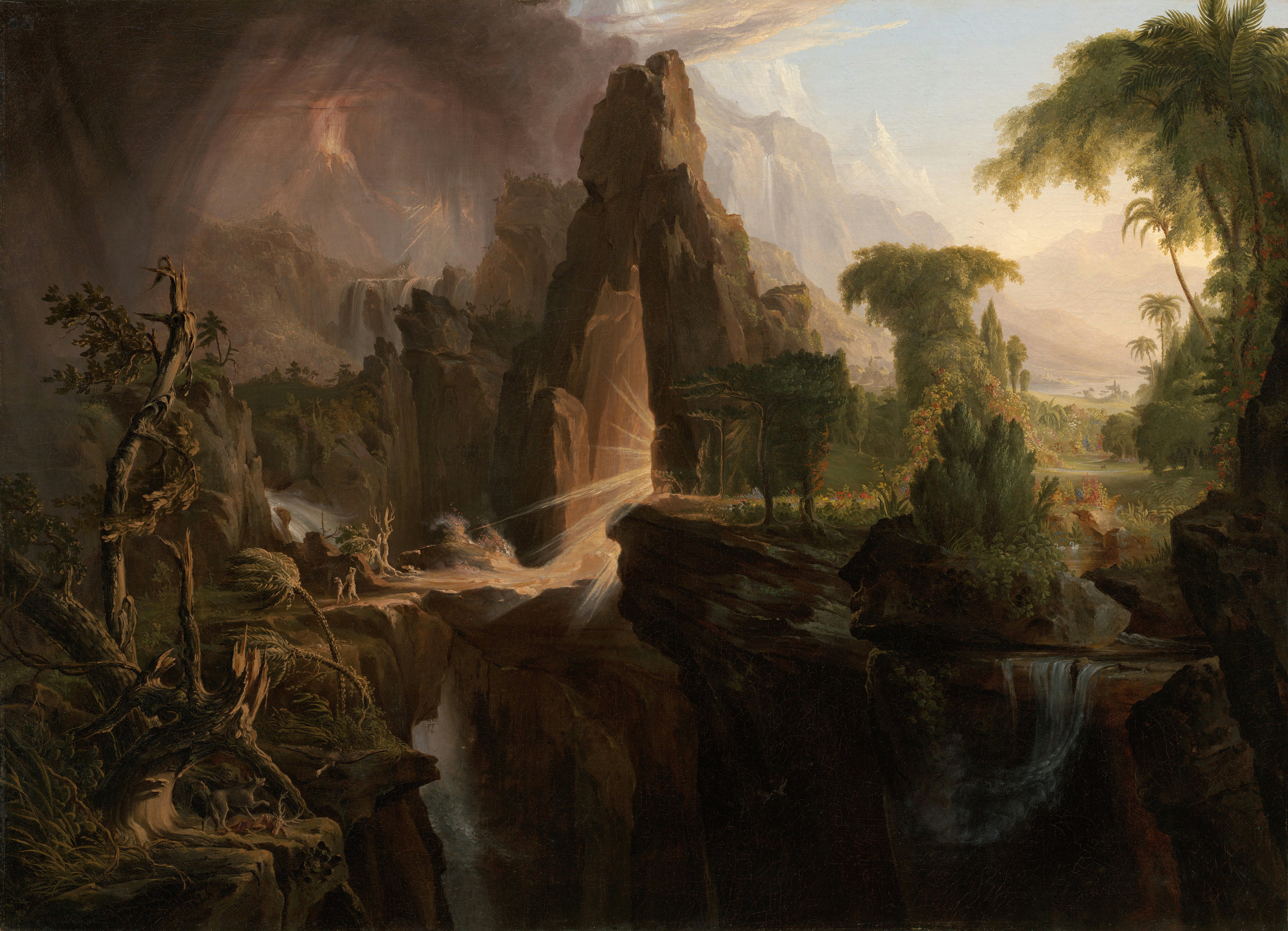
A traditional depiction of the Fall of Man doctrine by Thomas Cole (Expulsion from the Garden of Eden, 1828). His Dark Materials presents the Fall as a positive act of maturation.

His Dark Materials has occasioned controversy, primarily among some Christian groups.

Cynthia Grenier, in the Catholic Culture, wrote that "in the world of Pullman, God Himself (the Authority) is a merciless tyrant. His Church is an instrument of oppression, and true heroism consists of overthrowing both". William A. Donohue of the Catholic League described Pullman's trilogy as "atheism for kids". Pullman said of Donohue's call for a boycott, "Why don't we trust readers? [...] Oh, it causes me to shake my head with sorrow that such nitwits could be loose in the world".

In a November 2002 interview, Pullman was asked to respond to the Catholic Herald calling his books "the stuff of nightmares" and "worthy of the bonfire". He replied: "My response to that was to ask the publishers to print it in the next book, which they did! I think it's comical, it's just laughable". The original remark in the Catholic Herald (which was "there are numerous candidates that seem to me to be far more worthy of the bonfire than Harry Potter") was written in the context of parents in South Carolina pressing their Board of Education to ban the Harry Potter books.

Pullman expressed surprise over what he considered to be a relatively low level of criticism for His Dark Materials on religious grounds, saying "I've been surprised by how little criticism I've got. Harry Potter's been taking all the flak... Meanwhile, I've been flying under the radar, saying things that are far more subversive than anything poor old Harry has said. My books are about killing God". Others support this interpretation, arguing that the series, while clearly anticlerical, is also anti-theological because the death of God is represented as a fundamentally unimportant question.

Pullman found support from some other Christians, most notably from Rowan Williams, the former archbishop of Canterbury (spiritual head of the Anglican Communion), who argued that Pullman's attacks focus on the constraints and dangers of dogmatism and the use of religion to oppress, not on Christianity itself. Williams also recommended the His Dark Materials series of books for inclusion and discussion in Religious Education classes, and stated that "To see large school-parties in the audience of the Pullman plays at the National Theatre is vastly encouraging". Pullman and Williams took part in a National Theatre platform debate a few days later to discuss myth, religious experience, and its representation in the arts.

== Related works ==
=== Lyra's Oxford ===
The 2003 novella Lyra's Oxford takes place two years after the timeline of The Amber Spyglass. A witch who seeks revenge for her son's death in the war against the Authority draws Lyra, now 15, into a trap. Birds mysteriously rescue her and Pan, and she makes the acquaintance of an alchemist, formerly the witch's lover.

=== Once Upon a Time in the North ===
This 2008 novella serves as a prequel to His Dark Materials and focuses on the Texan aeronaut Lee Scoresby as a young man. After winning his hot-air balloon, Scoresby heads to the North, landing on the Arctic island Novy Odense, where he is pulled into a conflict between the oil tycoon Larsen Manganese, the corrupt mayoral candidate Ivan Poliakov, and his longtime enemy from the Dakota Country, Pierre McConville. The story tells of Lee and Iorek's first meeting and of how they overcame these enemies.

=== The Collectors ===
A short story originally released exclusively as an audiobook by Audible in December 2014, narrated by actor Bill Nighy. The story refers to the early life of Mrs Coulter and is set in the senior common room of an Oxford college. The story was released by Penguin Books as a physical book in September 2022.

=== The Book of Dust ===
The Book of Dust is a second trilogy of novels set before, during and after His Dark Materials. The first book, La Belle Sauvage, was published on 19 October 2017. The second book, The Secret Commonwealth, was published on 3 October 2019. The third and final book, The Rose Field, was published on 23 October 2025.

=== Serpentine ===
A novella that was released in October 2020. Set after the events of The Amber Spyglass and before The Secret Commonwealth, Lyra and Pantalaimon journey back to the far North to meet with the Consul of Witches.

=== The Imagination Chamber ===
In January 2022, Pullman announced the release of the book The Imagination Chamber: Cosmic Rays from Lyra's Universe, which would include new scenes set during the events of His Dark Materials and The Book of Dust. It was published on 28 April 2022.

== Adaptations ==
=== Radio ===
BBC Radio 4 broadcast a radio play adaptation of His Dark Materials in 3 episodes, each lasting 2½ hours. The books were adapted and dramatised by Lavinia Murray and directed by both David Hunter and Janet Whitaker, with the music composed by Billy Cowie. It was first broadcast over three consecutive weeks in from 4 January 2003, and then re-broadcast in both 2008-9 and in 2017, and was released by the BBC as box-sets on CD and audio cassette. The streaming rights are held by Audible.

The cast included:

- Terence Stamp as Lord Asriel
- Emma Fielding as Marisa Coulter
- Lulu Popplewell as Lyra Belacqua
- Daniel Anthony as Will Parry
- Tracy-Ann Oberman as Serafina Pekkala
- Peter Marinker as Lee Scoresby
- Steve Hodson as Iorek Byrnison
- Ray Fearon as the angel Bathalmos who narrates the series.

Both Stamp and Fearon had roles in the subsequent BBC One television adaptation of 2019 to 2022, with Stamp as the previous elderly bearer of Æsahættr, the Subtle Knife, Giacomo Paradisi in Torre degli Angeli of Cittàgazze, and Fearon as Will Parry's school boxing coach Mr Hanway.

Also in 2003, an Irish radio dramatisation of Northern Lights was made by RTÉ (Raidió Teilifís Éireann).

=== Theatre ===
Nicholas Hytner directed a theatrical version of the books as a two-part, six-hour performance for London's Royal National Theatre in December 2003, running until March 2004. It starred Anna Maxwell-Martin as Lyra, Dominic Cooper as Will, Timothy Dalton as Lord Asriel, Patricia Hodge as Mrs Coulter and Niamh Cusack as Serafina Pekkala, with dæmon puppets designed by Michael Curry. The play was successful and was revived (with a different cast and a revised script) for a second run between November 2004 and April 2005. It has since been staged by several other theatres in the UK and elsewhere.

A new production was staged at Birmingham Repertory Theatre in March and April 2009, directed by Rachel Kavanaugh and Sarah Esdaile and starring Amy McAllister as Lyra. This version toured the UK and included a performance in Pullman's hometown of Oxford; Pullman made a cameo appearance.

=== Film ===
New Line Cinema released a film adaptation, titled The Golden Compass, on 7 December 2007. Directed by Chris Weitz, the production had a mixed reception, and though worldwide sales were strong, its U.S. earnings were not as high as the studio had hoped.

The filmmakers obscured the explicitly Biblical character of the Authority to avoid offending viewers. Weitz declared that he would not do the same for the planned sequels. "Whereas The Golden Compass had to be introduced to the public carefully", he said, "the religious themes in the second and third books can't be minimised without destroying the spirit of these books. ...I will not be involved with any 'watering down' of books two and three, since what I have been working towards the whole time in the first film is to be able to deliver on the second and third".

The Golden Compass film stars Dakota Blue Richards as Lyra, Nicole Kidman as Mrs Coulter, and Daniel Craig as Lord Asriel. Eva Green plays Serafina Pekkala, Ian McKellen voices Iorek Byrnison, and Freddie Highmore voices Pantalaimon. While Sam Elliott blamed the Catholic Church's opposition for forcing the cancellation of any adaptations of the rest of the trilogy, The Guardian's film critic Stuart Heritage believed disappointing reviews may have been the real reason.

=== Television ===
In November 2015, the BBC commissioned a television adaptation of His Dark Materials. The eight-part adaptation had a planned premiere date in 2017. By July 2018, Dafne Keen had been provisionally cast as Lyra Belacqua, Ruth Wilson as Marisa Coulter, James McAvoy as Lord Asriel, Lin-Manuel Miranda as Lee Scoresby and Clarke Peters as the Master of Jordan College. The series received its premiere in London on 15 October 2019. Broadcast began on BBC One in the United Kingdom and in Ireland on 3 November and on HBO in the United States on 4 November 2019. In 2020 the second series of His Dark Materials began streaming on BBC One in the United Kingdom on 8 November and on HBO Max in the United States on 16 November. The third and final eight-episode series premiered first on HBO on 5 December 2022, and on 18 December 2022 in the UK.

=== Audiobooks ===
Random House produced unabridged audiobooks of each His Dark Materials novel, read by Pullman, with parts read by actors including Jo Wyatt, Steven Webb, Peter England, Stephen Thorne and Douglas Blackwell. Penguin Audio has produced subsequent audiobook versions of the trilogy, read by Ruth Wilson.

=== Graphic novels ===
A series of graphic novels was produced by French writer Stephane Melchior, the first one adapting Northern Lights and released in 2017 and illustrated by Clement Obrerie. The second volume, adapting The Subtle Knife was released in 2020 and illustrated by Thomas Gilbert.

== See also ==
- List of His Dark Materials and The Book of Dust characters
- Races and creatures in His Dark Materials
- Locations in His Dark Materials
