= Dust (His Dark Materials) =

Fictional particle in His Dark Materials

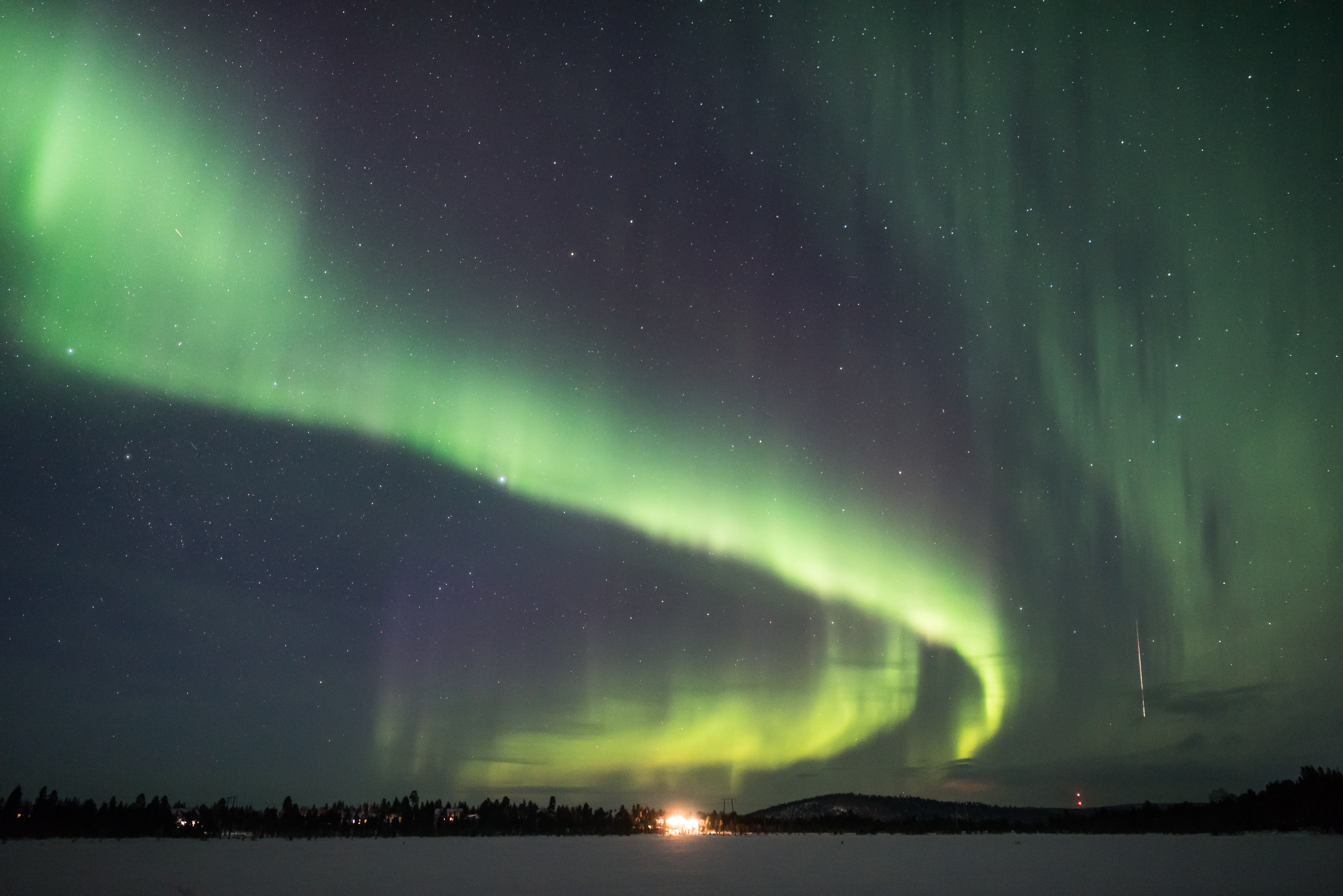
In Northern Lights (The Golden Compass), Lord Asriel travels to the frozen North to investigate the mystery of Dust.

In Philip Pullman's trilogies His Dark Materials and The Book of Dust, Dust or Rusakov particles are particles associated with consciousness that are integral to the plot. In the multiverse in which these trilogies are set, Dust is attracted to consciousness, especially after puberty; the Church within the series associates Dust with original sin and seeks its end. Pullman described Dust in an interview as "an analogy of consciousness, and consciousness is this extraordinary property we have as human beings".

== Analogs ==
=== Paradise Lost ===
Anne-Marie Bird links Pullman's concept of "Dust" to "a conventional metaphor for human physicality inspired by God's judgment on humanity." Writing in Children's Literature in Education, she suggests that the first trilogy develops John Milton's metaphor of "dark materials" from Paradise Lost "into a 'substance' in which good and evil, and spirit and matter – conceptual opposites that form the basis of religious dualism – coexist."

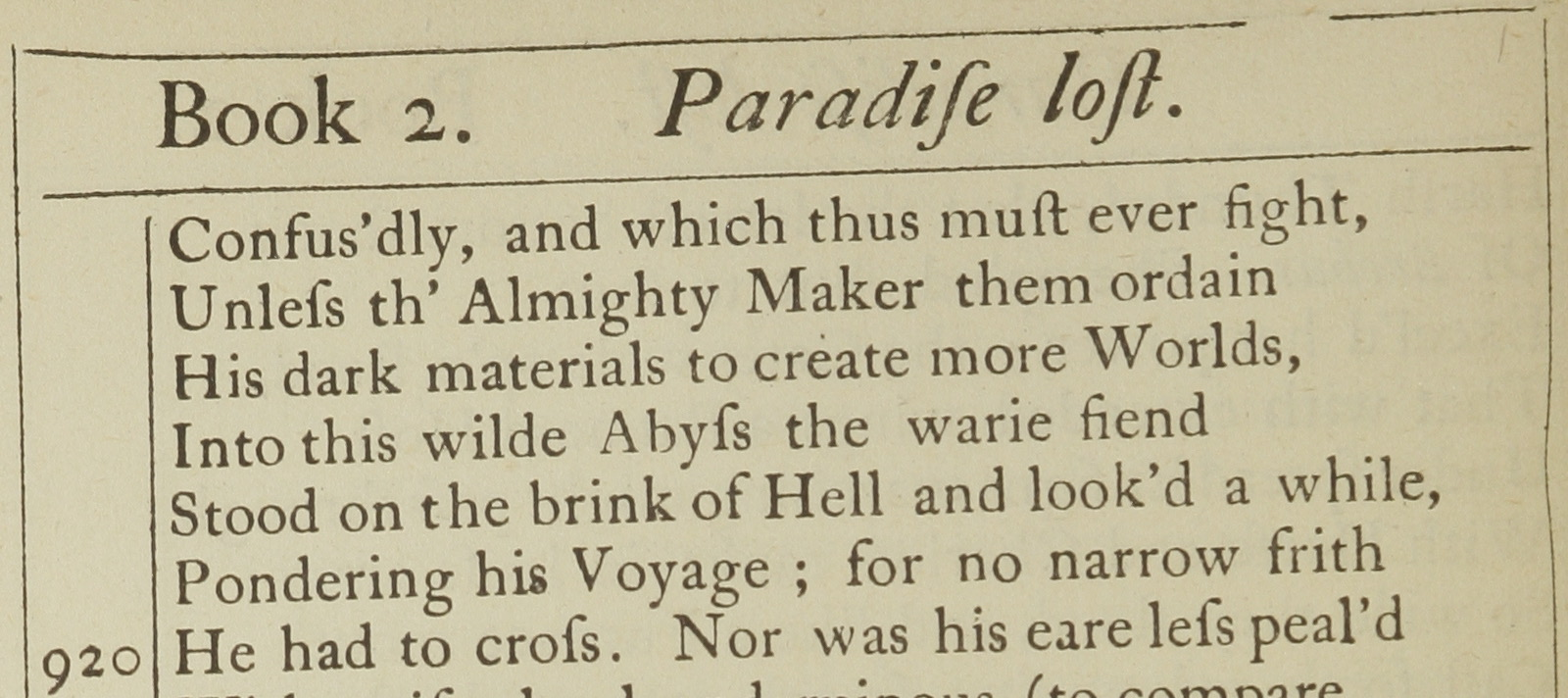
Dust as "dark matter" is compared to the "dark materials" of John Milton's Paradise Lost.

Meanwhile, William A. Oram argues that Pullman follows Milton in presenting "matter" as inherently good. For Pullman, he says, the ethical opposite is the "void", which is "evil". According to Oram, the Dust is the full embodiment of matter, "because in matter Dust becomes conscious." Oram compares the following passage from The Amber Spyglass, in which the angel Balthamos explains the origin of Dust, to Satan's account of his coming to consciousness in Book V of Paradise Lost:

"Dust is only a name for what happens when matter begins to understand itself. Matter loves matter. It seeks to know more about itself, and Dust is formed. The first angels condensed out of Dust and the Authority was the first of all."

=== Other analogs ===
In Fantasy, Myth and the Measure of Truth, folklore and fantasy scholar William Gray has noted similarities between Pullman's descriptions of Dust and Perelandra by C. S. Lewis, particularly the "Great Dance" passages where "Dust" is described as "at the centre" and "whereof allworlds, and the bodies that are not worlds, are made". However, in their Mythlore article exploring Pullman's self-positioning versus C. S. Lewis, Marek Oziewicz and Daniel Hade point out that Pullman subverts Lewis's redemption story in which death is overcome. Whereas Lewis's characters will supposedly live forever in their physical bodies when they enter "the real Narnia", in The Amber Spyglass, "Pullman's ghosts laugh in surprise as they find themselves 'turning into the night, the starlight, the air' in a materialist subversion of 'dust thou art, and unto dust shall thou return'."

== Naming ==
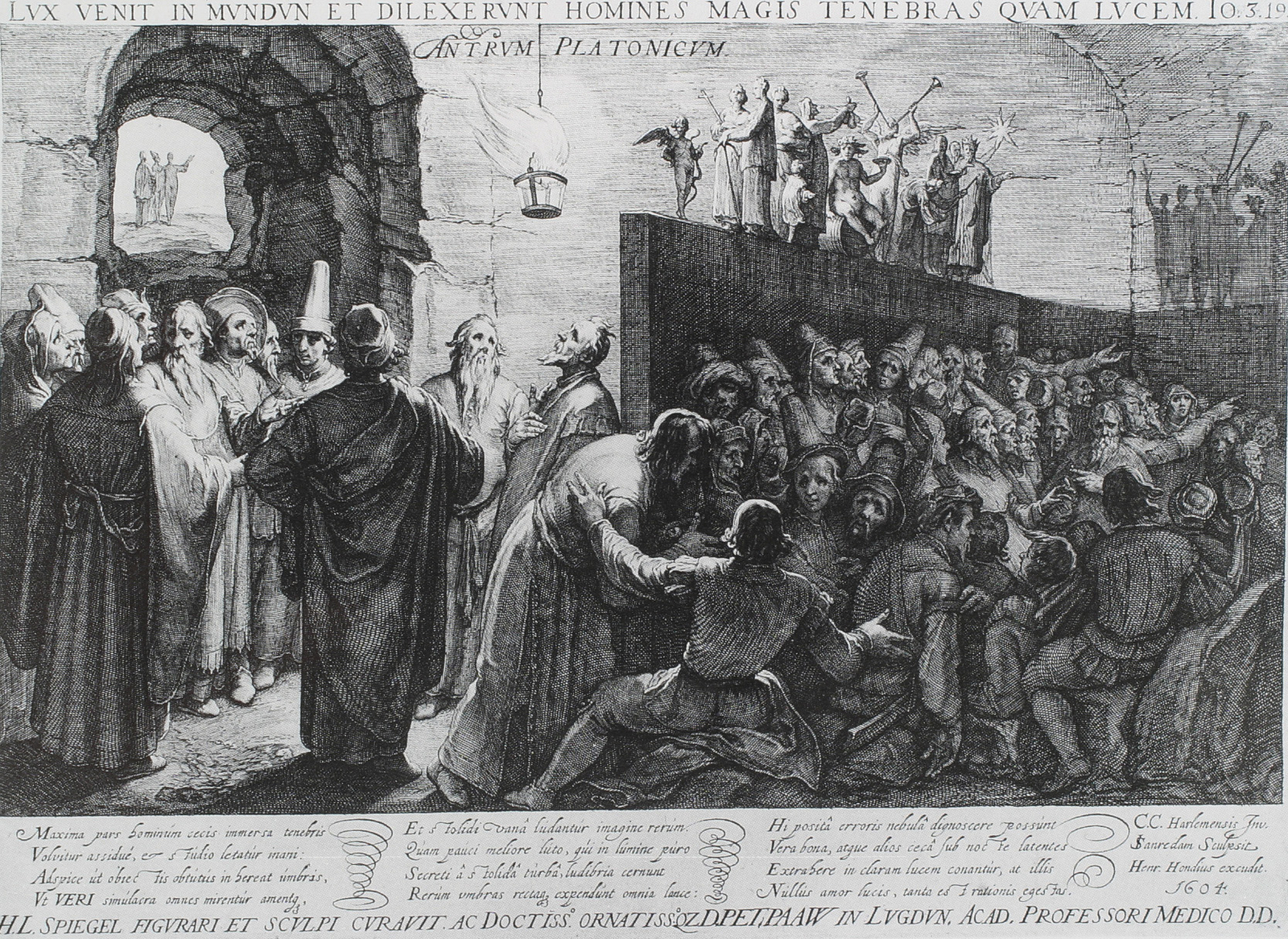
In The Subtle Knife, Mary Malone explains that she researches "shadows on the walls of the Cave, you see, from Plato". (Engraving of Plato's Allegory of the Cave by Jan Saenredam, after Cornelis van Haarlem, 1604)

In Northern Lights, Lord Asriel reveals the origin of the term "Dust" to be from a passage from the slightly alternative version of the Bible in Lyra's world:

"In the sweat of thy face shalt thou eat bread, till thou return unto the ground; for out of it wast thou taken: for dust thou art, and unto dust shalt thou return." — Genesis 3:19

Dust was previously known (in Lyra Belacqua's universe) as "Rusakov particles", named after their discoverer, Boris Mikhailovitch Rusakov. Rusakov discovered a field permeating the universe that enabled consciousness, before the discovery of Dust; its existence was predicted, as:

"the existence of a Rusakov field implies the existence of a related particle."

In our universe, Mary Malone researches dark matter, referring to it as "Shadows" or "Shadow particles". The name "Shadows" was given to the particle by her colleague, Oliver Payne, in references to Plato's Allegory of the Cave, involving "shadows on the wall". When she communicates with Shadows by interfacing with her detector, it confirms that they are the same as Dust and dark matter. (Note: Dr. Mary Malone's typed conversation with her dark matter detector: Are you Shadows? YES. Are you the same as Lyra's Dust? YES. And is that dark matter? YES. Is dark matter conscious? EVIDENTLY. — The Subtle Knife) The Mulefa, who are able to see Dust directly, use the word "sraf" accompanied by a leftward flick of the trunk (or arm for humans) to describe it.

== Nature and characteristics ==
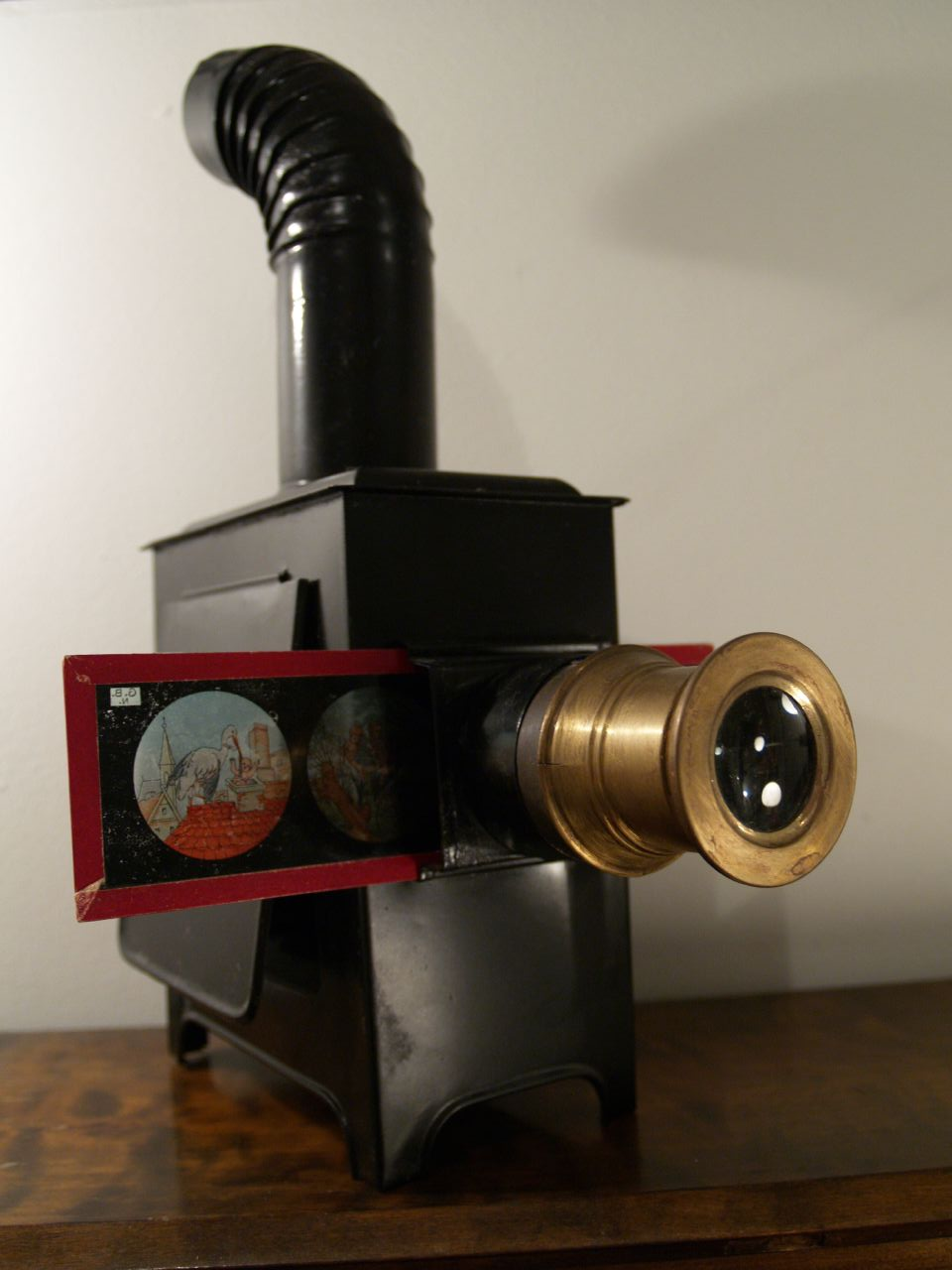
In Northern Lights, Lord Asriel uses a "projecting lantern" based on Pullman's grandfather's magic lantern to reveal Dust as "a fountain of glowing particles".

In the multiverse of His Dark Materials, the characters perceive Dust visually; the scholar Amanda M. Greenwell observes that "at no point does any character touch, taste, hear, or smell Dust." While the human eye is unable to see Dust unaided, multiple characters still manage to "see" it.

Attempts to see and interpret Dust, or see and appreciate evidence of it in other visual manifestations, drive the action of the entire trilogy—which suggests that Pullman's work, insofar as it employs this investigation into visual literacy, is largely about the way the human subject chooses to perceive the world around him.

At the start of Northern Lights Lord Asriel is one of the few to have seen Dust, but only with the aid of "photograms" taken with "a new specially prepared emulsion". He shows the scholars at Jordan College a slide show, revealing Dust as "a fountain of glowing particles". Pullman himself has stated that the "projecting lantern" that Asriel uses was based on childhood memories of his own grandfather's magic lantern.

When Dust is first mentioned in Northern Lights, it seems to be something negative; only later do Lyra and her dæmon, Pantalaimon, discover that it is good and necessary for survival. Lord Asriel observes that Dust only gathers on adults and not children, leading Lyra to uncover the true meaning of Dust. In her world, the Church has identified Dust as what it calls "original sin"; Dust originated when Adam and Eve ate the fruit of the Tree of the Knowledge of Good and Evil. In Pullman's universe, Dust is "consciousness and knowledge and wisdom" – something children do not yet possess, and a positive force for everyone except those in the Magisterium.

== Functions ==
Dust came into being when living things became conscious of themselves; but it needed some feedback system to reinforce it and make it safe, as the mulefa had their wheels and the oil from the trees. Without something like that, it would all vanish. Thought, imagination, feeling, would all wither and blow away, leaving nothing but a brutish automatism; and that brief period when life was conscious of itself would flicker out like a candle in every one of the billions of worlds where it had burned brightly.

— The Amber Spyglass

Dust is attracted to objects that have been formed by consciousness, and it can be viewed by special photographic emulsions. It is particularly attracted to consciousnesses that have matured; in the case of humans in Lyra's world, this happens when their dæmon is fixed in shape. For the mulefa, this happens when adolescents start using wheels. Dust is also what connects humans to their dæmons. If the bond between a child and their dæmon is severed (as through Intercision), both the child and the dæmon will eventually die. If the separation occurs after Dust has settled on the person (that is, after adolescence), the person becomes a lifeless shell.

In The Amber Spyglass, Will and Lyra learn that, "Without Dust, people will not be able to survive."

== Communication ==
Dust is able to communicate with humans via several methods shown throughout His Dark Materials and The Book of Dust, including by use of alethiometers. Mary Malone is able to construct a computer program that, when paired with a detector, can communicate with Dust by typed questions. Later, Mary uses I Ching divination, which Lyra confirms to be a method of communicating with Dust. (Note: Lyra Belacqua explaining what she has learned about communication with Dust to Mary Malone: "And there's a way they have in that country of talking to Dust, I mean Shadows, same as you got here and I got with the – I got with pictures, only their way uses sticks. I think it meant that picture on the door, but I didn't understand it, really. I thought when I first saw it there was something important about it, only I didn't know what. So there must be lots of ways of talking to Shadows.")

=== Alethiometers ===
An alethiometer is a truth-telling device which can answer any question. The word is derived from the Greek words aletheia (truth) and metron (measure). In Lyra's world, six alethiometers were constructed. Also known as symbol readers, alethiometers have a ring of 36 standard symbols, but are all different; some, for example have more elaborate decoration. Over the course of the books, several alethiometers are shown being read, including by Lyra Belacqua, Hannah Relf, and Fra Pavel.

Each symbol on the rim of an alethiometer has several levels of meaning; for example, the anchor can mean steadfastness, hope, the sea, or other interpretations. To phrase a question, three adjustable levers are pointed at symbols, and the reader has to hold the level of meaning for each symbol in their head. A fourth lever, made of an alloy sensitive to Dust, swings around, stopping on different symbols to give an answer, with the number of times it stops at a given symbol indicating the level of meaning intended.

In La Belle Sauvage, it is said that no more alethiometers can be built, as their construction depends on a rare metal being subjected to special treatment, knowledge of which has been lost. Oxford has an alethiometer in its library, which is read by Hannah Relf, various other universities have one, and one is missing. After the Magisterium attempts to steal one, a secret society opposed to their actions is able to obtain it and give it to Relf to use on their behalf. The missing alethiometer is found by Malcolm Polstead in the pack of Gerard Bonneville and given to the Master of Jordan College for safekeeping. In Northern Lights, it is this alethiometer which is given by the Master to Lyra, who is able to read it intuitively. At that point in the story, only two other alethiometers are known to have survived.

== History within the books ==
Within the books, Dust came into existence when consciousness did; it was created by consciousness, as well as being conscious. Occasionally, Dust condensed into Angels; the first of these was called The Authority, who told all the angels that subsequently condensed that he was the creator of the multiverse. In the trilogy, Angels are formed from condensing Dust. These angels only appear as winged humans because that is what is expected of them; in reality, they have more complex shapes, similar to "architecture".

About 33,000 years prior to the time of the books, Dust had induced changes in sapient species, including humans and mulefa, to allow them to interact better, conferring more consciousness. For the mulefa, this was the start of their oral history and memory as a species. When asked directly, Dust states that this was done by rebel angels for vengeance over the war in heaven. (Note: The dust explains its intervention in the evolution of sentient creatures to Mary Malone: And did you intervene in human evolution? YES. Why? VENGEANCE. Vengeance for – oh! Rebel angels! After the war in Heaven – Satan and the Garden of Eden. — The Subtle Knife)

300 years before the start of His Dark Materials, scientists in Cittagazze had created the Subtle Knife, which allowed them to travel between worlds. However, explorers were not meticulous about closing the cuts in the fabric between worlds, and Dust was lost into the void between universes through the cracks of these windows. At that time, the mulefa noticed that their trees – which depend on Dust for fertilisation – had started producing fewer seeds.

== See also ==
- The Book of Dust
- Dæmon (His Dark Materials)
- Dark matter
- Consciousness
