= The Secrets of the Wild Wood =

1965 book written by Tonke Dragt

- Author: Tonke Dragt
- Original title: Geheimen van het Wilde Woud
- Translator: Laura Watkinson
- Illustrator: Tonke Dragt
- Cover artist: Tonke Dragt (original)
- Language: Dutch
- Subject: Knight-errant
- Genre: Fantasy; Adventure
- Set in: Middle Ages
- Publisher: Leopold, Pushkin Press
- Publication date: 1965
- Publication place: Netherlands
- English publication date: 2015
- Pages: 481
- ISBN: 978-1782690610
- Preceded by: The Letter for the King

The Secrets of the Wild Wood (Dutch: Geheimen van het Wilde Woud, pronounced [ɣəˈɦɛimə(ɱ) vɑn ət ˈʋɪldə ˈʋʌut]) is a Dutch children's book written by Tonke Dragt in 1965. It is a sequel to The Letter for the King, which has been adapted to a feature film and a Netflix series. The book was translated to English by Laura Watkinson in 2015.

== Synopsis ==
This book is set long ago in the fictional realms of King Dagonaut and King Unauwen. It is about a young boy who has just been knighted, Sir Tiuri with the White Shield, and his squire Piak. They had arranged to meet Sir Ristridin in the spring at the castle of his ancestors, Castle Ristridin. To investigate Ristridin went to the Wild Wood in the fall. The Wild Wood is a vast forest of which little is known, but many strange rumors circulate. When Sir Ristridin fails to show up, Tiuri and Piak decide to look for him. Together with Sir Bendoe and Sir Ewijn, who are waiting for Ristridin as well, they go to Castle Islan which is close to the Wild Wood. There they receive the same information about Ristridin as they had previously heard; that he left the forest in the fall because there was not much going on. Bendoe and Ewijn go to investigate in the nearby village and hear rumors that he had gone to Deltaland. At the same time, Tiuri and Piak head towards the Wild Wood. There they find nothing but when Tiuri returns, he meets someone who has helped him on his earlier adventures: The Fool of the Forest. He tells him that he saw Ristridin in the Wild Wood in the winter, battered and crying as he carved letters into a tree.

At the same time, news arrives of an invasion from Deltaland. Bendoe and Ewijn travel to the border where the invasion took place, but Tiuri decides not to go and goes into the Wild Wood with Piak and the Fool. There they find the tree of which the Fool had told them and they find out that Ristridin's companions have been murdered and there is danger in the forest. On the way back from the forest they are ambushed. Tiuri and the Fool are captured but Piak manages to escape. Tiuri and the Fool are taken into the forest where he is imprisoned by the Knight with the Black Shield. Tiuri finds out that this is the Prince of Eviellan, also the youngest son of King Unauwen. Next to the castle where Tiuri is now imprisoned, the prince has cut open a forgotten road to the Kingdom of Unauwen and is preparing a surprise attack. Among the Prince's men is Jaro, the red rider whose life Tiuri saved. With the help of Jaro, Tiuri and the Fool escape. They flee into the territory of the Men in Green where they can escape from the black knight. The men in green are forest people who live in the Wild Wood and can even jump from tree to tree.

Meanwhile, Piak tries to find help and meets Sir Ivor, who is on his way to the Wild Wood to investigate the rumors. Piak joins him and they go to the Wild Wood together. There they meet the Red Riders, who are enemies of the Black Knight and the Prince of Eviellan. With their help, they try to rescue Tiuri and the Fool. In the end, they succeed and the Prince is defeated. Tiuri and his friends return home as heroes.

== Literary sources ==
- Tonke Dragt, Geheimen van het Wilde Woud, 1965
