= Gilet =

Sleeveless jacket

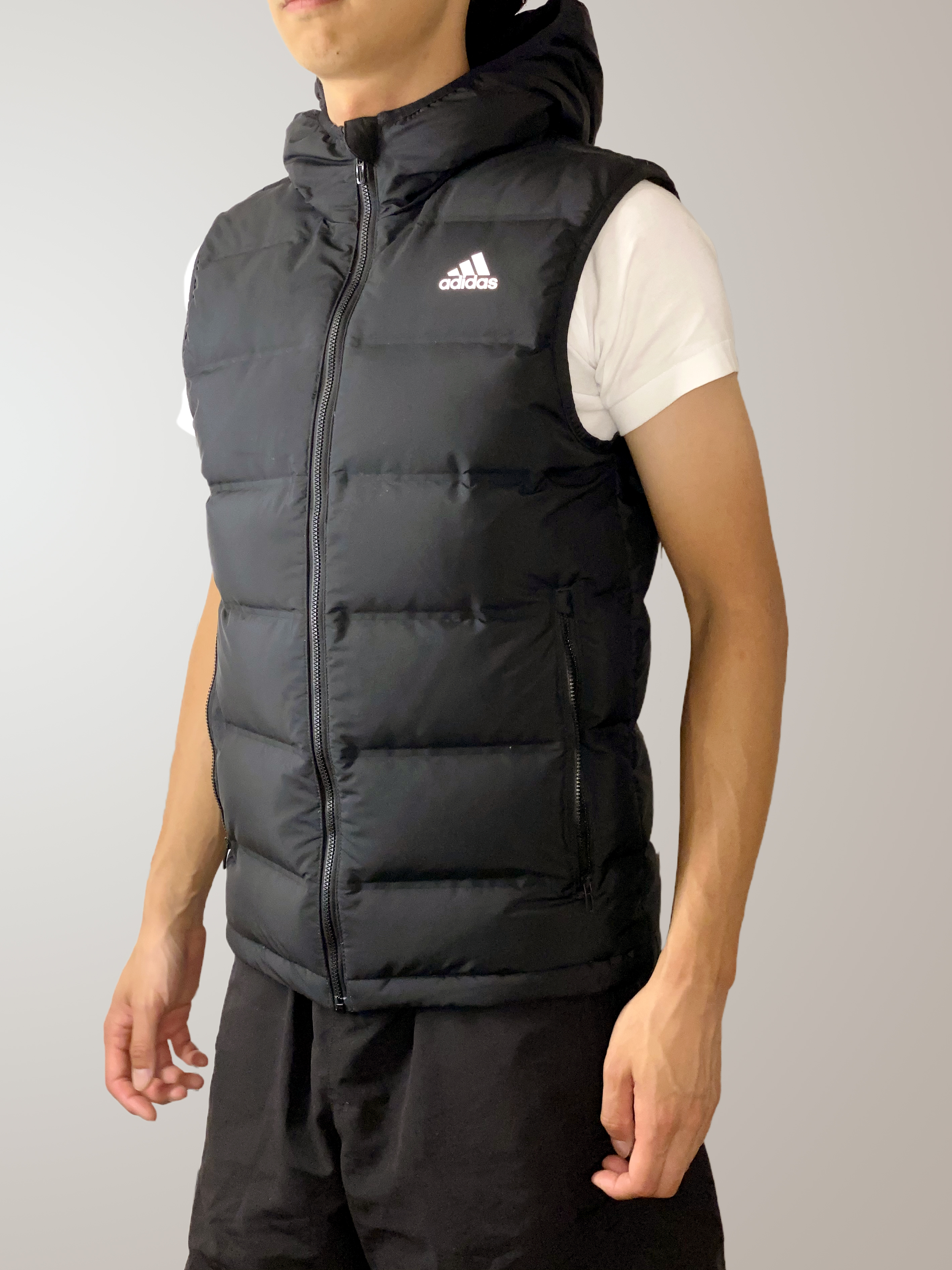
An Adidas Helionic Down vest as an example of a modern design for a hooded down gilet, featuring seamless quilted pockets filled with down.

A gilet (/ˈdʒiːleɪ/, US also /dʒɪˈleɪ/) or body warmer (in the U.S., commonly called a vest) is a sleeveless jacket resembling a waistcoat or blouse.

== History ==
Gilets can be waist- to knee-length and are typically straight-sided rather than fitted, but historically, they were fitted and embroidered.

In 19th-century dressmaking, a gilet was a dress bodice shaped like a man's waistcoat.

== Applications ==
Gilets are often worn as an outer layer, for extra warmth outdoors, or indoors on occasion.

Fashion gilets can be made of cloth, fake fur, or knitted wool.

Sports gilets are often windproof and made of wool fleece or a similar synthetic material, Polar fleece.

High-end hiking jackets often have an integral gilet inside them, which can be zipped on and off, as well as insulated with down.

Racing cyclists use thin light gilets with a windproof front and mesh back. Shooting gilets are rugged and made of leather.

Short, overwear gilets are called bodywarmers in the United Kingdom.

== Gallery ==
Derivatives and styles of gilets

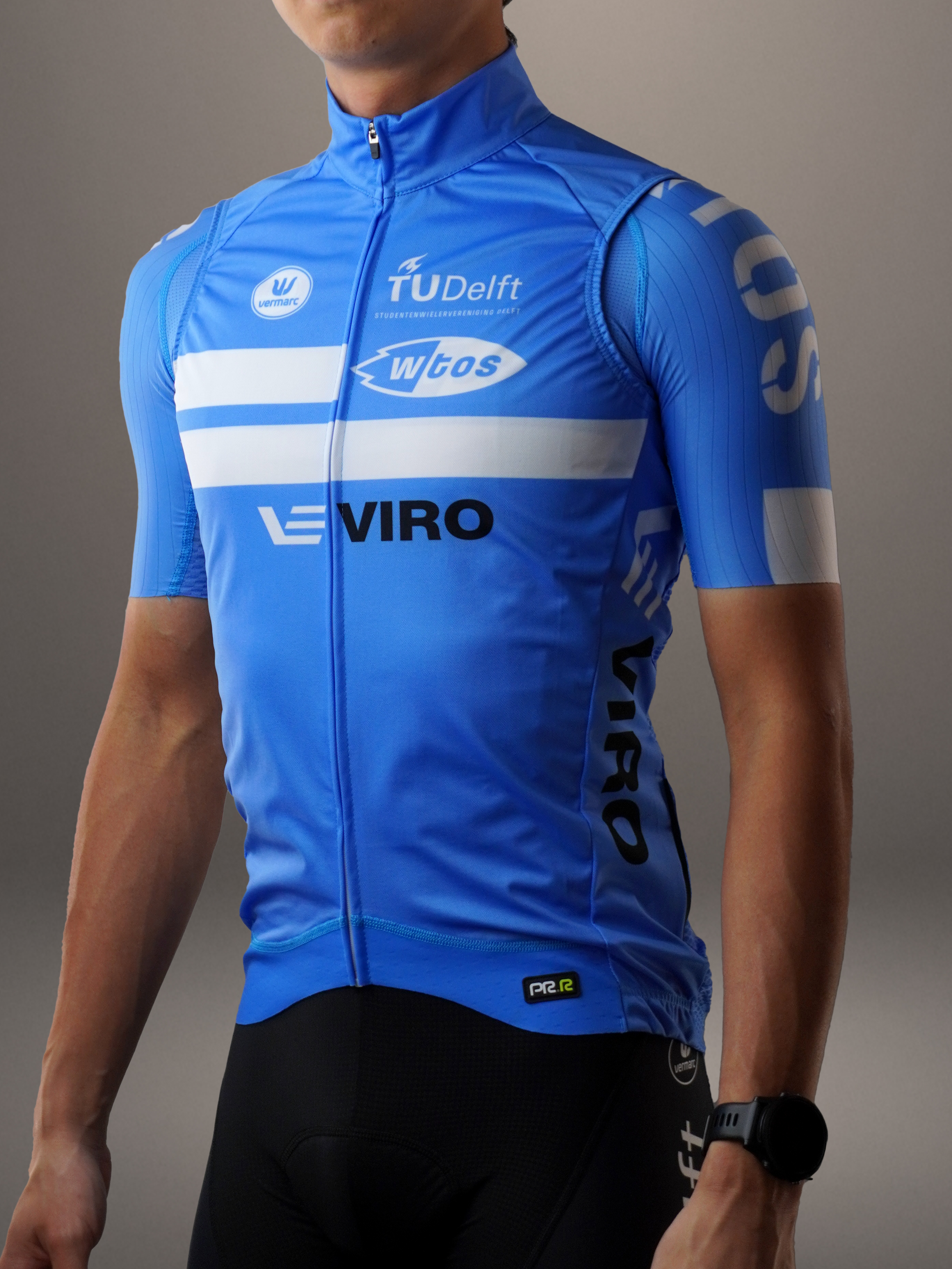
A thin, non-insulated gilet for a cycling team

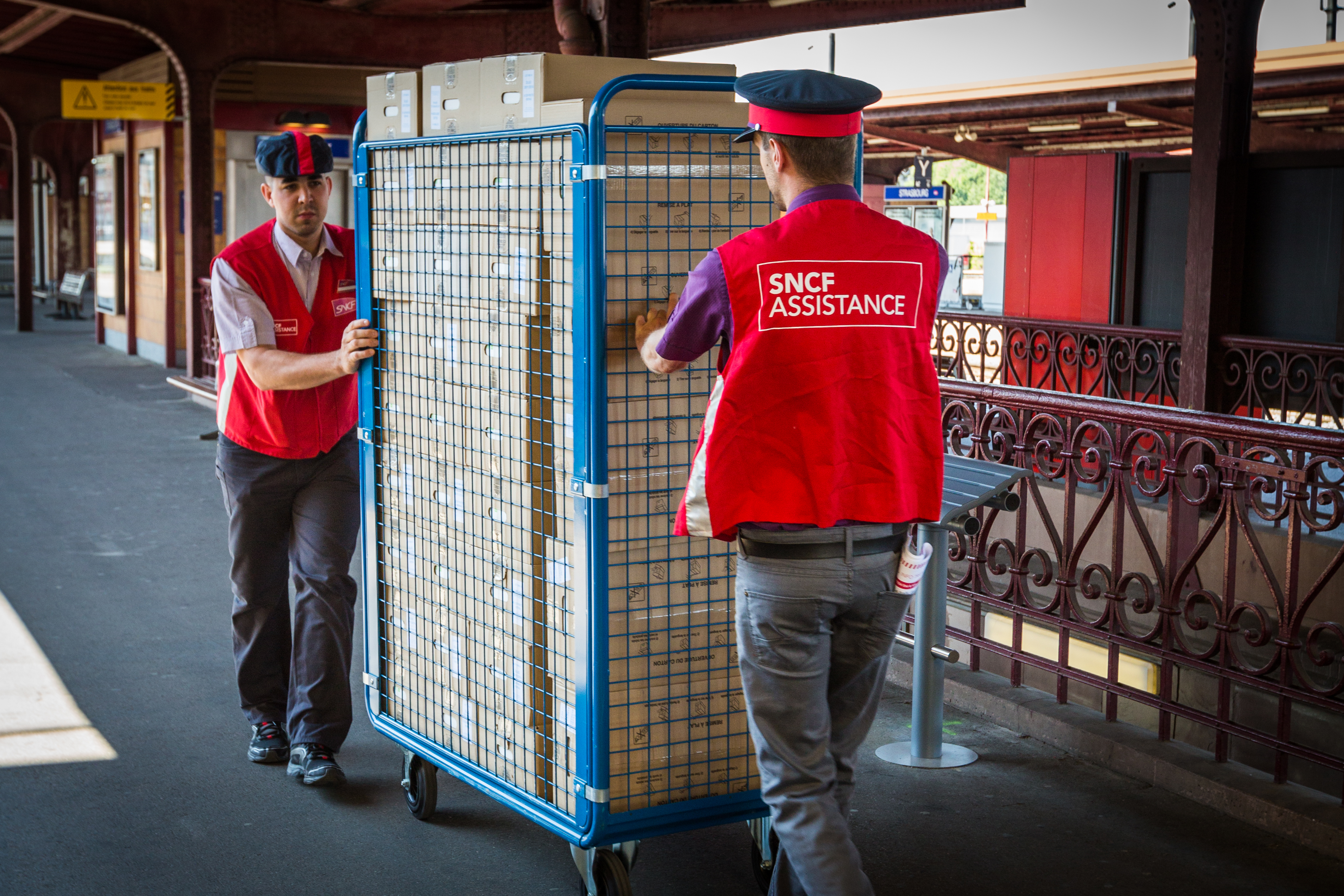
Two men wearing gilets at Strasbourg railway station in France.

== See also ==
- British country clothing
- Cycling kit
- Jerkin (garment)
- Journade
- Scapular
- Surcoat
- Tabard
- Vest
- Yelek
