= Paul Trijbits =

British film producer

Paul Trijbits is a Dutch-born film and television producer.

== Career ==
Before joining the UK Film Council, Paul Trijbits produced a number of feature films including Richard Stanley's Hardware and Danny Cannon's The Young Americans. Trijbits was a founder member and former co-chair of the New Producers Alliance (NPA) and sat on the board of PACT. He is currently CEO of Magical Society UK, a partnership with Aton Soumache and Joann Sfar’s Magical Society in France.

=== UK FilmCouncil (2000–2006) ===
In 2000, Paul Trijbits was appointed Head of the New Cinema Fund at the UK Film Council. During his six-year tenure, key initiatives such as the Berlinale Talent Campus were launched and he supported films such as Bloody Sunday (Golden Bear, Berlin 2002), The Magdalene Sisters (Golden Lion, Venice 2002). In 2006, the New Cinema Fund supported Ken Loach's The Wind that Shakes the Barley and Andrea Arnold's Red Road who won the Palme D'Or and the Prix du Jury in Cannes, respectively.

=== Ruby Films (2007–2012) ===
In 2007, Trijbits joined Alison Owen's production company Ruby Films. Producer credits include Cary Fukunaga's Jane Eyre; Stephen Frears' Tamara Drewe; and Disney's Saving Mr. Banks, starring Emma Thompson & Tom Hanks. He also executive produced Andrea Arnold's Fish Tank (Prix de Jury, Cannes Film Festival 2006), Oliver Hirschbiegel's Five Minutes of Heaven (Best Director & Screenplay Sundance Film Festival 2009); International Emmy award-winning TV series Small Island based on Andrea Levy's novel; Stephen Poliakoff's Golden Globe winner Dancing On The Edge, and Nigel Slater's Toast, which had its gala premiere at the 61st Berlin International Film Festival.

=== FilmWave (2012–2023) ===
With Anthony Bregman's Likely Story, Trijbits co-produced Sing Street, directed by John Carney (Once & Begin Again), and Every Day based on David Levithan's YA novel for MGM. He also produced Alone in Berlin, with Emma Thompson & Brendan Gleeson and Martin Koolhoven's Brimstone starring Guy Pearce & Dakota Fanning. He executive produced J.K. Rowling's The Casual Vacancy for the BBC and HBO and in 2020 he launched the Netflix Original Series The Letter for the King, based on his favourite book by Tonke Dragt when growing up in Holland.

=== Magical Society (2023 - present) ===
The partnership with Aton Soumache and Joann Sfar’s Magical Society in France commenced in 2023 after the Netflix Original Series The Letter for the King provided a pathway for the desire to make family and four quadrant content. A number of film and television projects based on the graphic novels of Joann Sfar are currently being developed.

Paul recently produced Virdee, the BBC One Bradford set crime thriller series based on the Harry Virdee crime novels by AA Dhand, and winner of two Eastern ACTA awards including best screenplay.

== Filmography ==
=== Feature films ===
| Year | Film | Role |
|---|---|---|
| 1990 | Hardware | Producer |
| 1993 | Dust Devil | Executive producer |
| 1993 | The Young Americans | Producer |
| 1995 | Boston Kickout | Executive producer |
| 1997 | Roseanna's Grave | Producer |
| 2000 | Paranoid | Producer |
| 2001 | My Brother Tom | Executive producer |
| 2002 | Bloody Sunday | Executive producer |
| 2002 | This Is Not a Love Song | Executive producer |
| 2002 | Tomorrow La Scala! | Executive producer |
| 2002 | The Magdalene Sisters | Executive producer |
| 2002 | Noi Albinoi | Executive producer |
| 2003 | Bodysong (documentary) | Executive producer |
| 2003 | Intermission | Executive producer |
| 2003 | Game Over: Kasparov and the Machine (documentary) | Executive producer |
| 2003 | Touching the Void (documentary) | Executive producer |
| 2004 | In My Father's Den | Executive producer |
| 2004 | Yes | Executive producer |
| 2004 | Bullet Boy | Executive producer |
| 2005 | Shooting Dogs | Executive producer |
| 2005 | Pierrepoint | Executive producer |
| 2006 | The Wind That Shakes the Barley | Executive producer |
| 2006 | Red Road | Executive producer |
| 2006 | London to Brighton | Executive producer |
| 2006 | This Is England | Executive producer |
| 2007 | Brick Lane | Executive producer |
| 2007 | Nightwatching | Executive producer |
| 2008 | Five Minutes of Heaven | Executive producer |
| 2009 | Fish Tank | Executive producer |
| 2010 | Chatroom | Producer |
| 2010 | Tamara Drewe | Producer |
| 2010 | Toast | Executive producer |
| 2011 | Jane Eyre | Producer |
| 2012 | Lay the Favorite | Producer |
| 2013 | Saving Mr. Banks | Executive producer |
| 2016 | Alone in Berlin | Producer |
| 2016 | Sing Street | Co-Producer |
| 2016 | Brimstone | Co-Producer |
| 2018 | Every Day | Producer |

=== Short films ===
| Year | Film | Role |
|---|---|---|
| 1988 | Fear of Drowning | Producer |
| 1990 | Voice of the Moon (documentary) | Producer |
| 2002 | Ape | Executive producer |
| 2010 | Alice | Executive producer |

=== Television ===
| Year | Programme | Role |
|---|---|---|
| 2001 | Is Harry on the Boat? (TV movie) | Executive producer |
| 2003 | This Little Life (TV movie) | Co-Executive producer |
| 2008 | Bad Mother's Handbook (TV movie) | Executive producer |
| 2014 | The Casual Vacancy (TV series) | Executive producer |
| 2020 | The Letter for the King (TV series) | Executive producer |
| 2025 | Virdee (TV series) | Executive producer |
