= Tonke Dragt =

Dutch children's writer and illustrator (1930–2024)

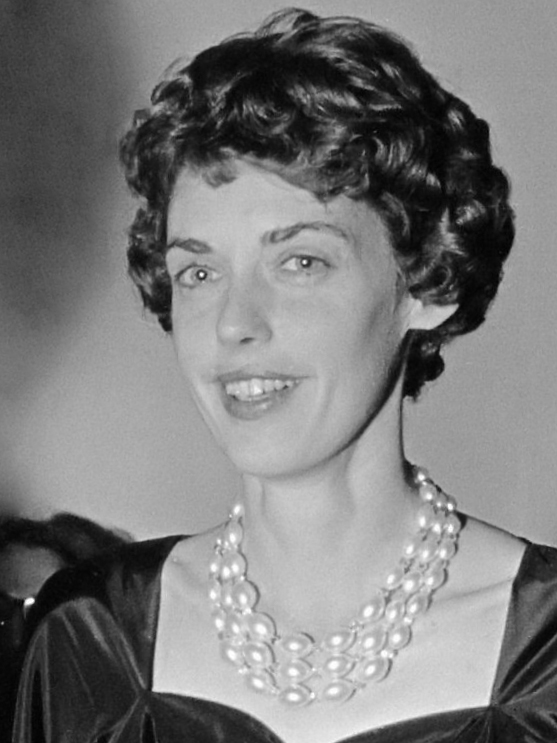
- Dragt in 1963
- Born: Antonia Johanna Dragt; 12 November 1930; Batavia, Dutch East Indies
- Died: 12 July 2024 (aged 93); The Hague, Netherlands
- Education: Royal Academy of Art, The Hague
- Writing career
- Period: 1961–2021
- Genre: Children's literature
- Notable works: "De zevensprong", "De brief voor de koning" ("The Letter for the King")
- Notable awards: Various
- Website: www.tonkedragt.nl

Antonia "Tonke" Johanna Dragt (Dutch pronunciation: [ˈtɔŋkə ˈdrɑxt]; 12 November 1930 – 12 July 2024) was a Dutch writer and illustrator of children's literature. Her book De brief voor de koning was chosen by CPNB as the best Dutch youth book of the latter half of the twentieth century.

== Biography ==
=== Childhood in Batavia ===
Antonia Johanna Dragt, better known as Tonke Dragt, was born in 1930 in Batavia in the Dutch East Indies (now Jakarta in Indonesia) as the eldest daughter of a Dutch insurance agent based in Batavia. Dragt was initially called "Tonneke" (Dutch for 'tubby'), a name she disliked "because I was tall and thin". She attended the Nassau School. Her family environment was creative: her father and one of her sisters were also interested in writing and the Dragt family had their own 'house library'. The inspiration for several of her early novels such as De brief voor de koning and Geheimen van het Wilde Woud were taken from her yearly Summer holidays at Puncak and Situgunung.

During the Second World War, Dragt, her mother and her two sisters were interned in Japanese prisoner's camp Tjideng. The situation in the camp was adverse, shortages of food and other essentials were prevalent. As reading had been her biggest hobby, Dragt found herself often bored as there were no novels. To solve this problem, aged 13, she and her friend Tineke decided to write a novel, De jacht op de touwkleurige (The hunt for the rope-coloured) under the pen name Tito Drastra. Dragt also provided illustrations for this novel. A second, never completed book, De Florentijnse ring would be a motive for a part of her debut novel De verhalen van de tweelingbroers. Both novels were written on loose sheets of used paper and toilet rolls due to the lack of proper notebooks.

After the Second World War ended, Dragt was reunited with her father and family moved to the Netherlands, where they first came to live in Dordrecht in 1949 and subsequently moved to The Hague. Dragt could never return to Indonesia, initially because she lacked money, later because her health would not allow it anymore.

=== Life in the Netherlands ===
In the Netherlands, she completed her HBS exams and subsequently was enrolled at the Academy of Visual Arts in The Hague. Her dream was to become a full-time artist, but her parents encouraged her to do something which would lead to making enough income to take care of herself. As a result, she focused on becoming an art teacher.

Dragt afterwards did most of her writing at night time while working as a drawing teacher at primary schools during the day. She had problems with controlling her classroom as a teacher, as classes were often filled with forty to fifty children due to the babyboom. She quickly noticed that by telling stories, she could calm her pupils down. This experience would lead to the inspiration for Frans van der Steg, the protagonist in her novel De zevensprong.

In 1956, her first work was accepted in several magazines and newspapers, most notably the magazine Kris Kras. Five years later, her debut book appeared and was received well by critics. She made a big name for herself with her second novel in 1962, De brief voor de koning (The Letter for the King), which won the award for being the best Dutch children's book of the year. She continued to produce at a high rhythm during the 1960s, but massively reduced the output of new work in the next decades, although collections of older short stories filled up many of the gaps.

Apart from writing and illustrating her own books, Tonke Dragt also made illustrations for some other books, including work by Paul Biegel, E. Nesbit, Rosemary Sutcliff, and the novel Elidor by Alan Garner.

Throughout the decade, the work of Tonke Dragt was translated into many languages, including German, Afrikaans, Czech, Spanish, Danish and Indonesian. It would take until 2013 before her first novel was translated into English.

== Style and themes ==
Many of the books and stories by Tonke Dragt are situated in a fantasy or science fiction environment, although usually closely related to or intertwined with the real world. De brief voor de koning, Geheimen van het Wilde Woud, and a few short stories, are set in a fictional medieval world. Torenhoog en mijlenbreed, Ogen van tijgers, and related stories, are near-future science fiction stories, where the action happens on Venus and Earth. De torens van februari alternates between our world and a parallel world. De zevensprong is most firmly set in a realistic setting.

Dragt uses elements of legends and fables, most clearly in Verhalen van de tweelingbroers. Her stories are mainly focused on one or a few male protagonists, often teenagers. They go on a personal quest, a search that may be externalized in an item like the letter in De brief voor de koning, but which results in a discovery of their own persona. Dragt admitted that she used male characters as it was more logical in her historic settings, for example the Middle Ages in De brief voor de koning, in which females played a smaller role. On top of that, she called the traditional "girl books" of her time "slow", preferring to read books aimed at boys.

Tonke Dragt's style and themes were considered to be unique in Dutch children's literature as up to the 1960s, most Dutch children's literature was set in a day-to-day realistic setting, involving young children. In the 1960s, Dragt, alongside Thea Beckman started pioneering children's literature with their thick books involving protagonists in historical fantasy and science fiction settings.

Dragt long admired British children's literature for its fantasy tradition, stating that Dutch literature demanded realism. In a 2019 interview, Dragt therefore recalled her first call with Miep Diekmann, who worked as an editor at Leopold at the time and was not entirely convinced by the first Verhalen van de tweelingbroers manuscript, stating that fables were out of fashion. Diekmann was also concerned with the thickness of the book, totalling over 350 pages, which was unusual for a children's book at the time. However, she was charmed by the illustrations and storytelling ability, calling Dragt "talented".

Dragt's first books and their illustrations were mainly inspired by her childhood in Batavia and by the Middle Ages. She incorporated settings in her story which were considered exotic by Dutch people, with Geheimen van het Wilde Woud and De brief voor de koning partially being set in rainforests and on mountains, knights with chain mail armour. In Verhalen van de tweelingbroers, the main setting of the story, the city Bainoe, strongly resembles Batavia in illustrations, while the illustrated characters in the story wear Italian Renaissance fashion, with the main characters Jiacomo and Laurenzo wearing a giornea and a cap.

== Success of The Letter for the King ==
The book The Letter for the King (Dutch: De brief voor de Koning) has sold over 1 million copies so far. The book has been translated many times, and reached its 22nd printing in Dutch in 2007 and its 61st printing in 2021.

In 2007, it premiered as a musical theater piece. This was the second theater production based on the works of Tonke Dragt, after an adaptation of De Zevensprong.

In 2015 a sequel, The Secrets of the Wild Wood, was translated into English.

The film based on the book, starring Derek de Lint was released in the summer of 2008. In 2020 Netflix presented a six episodes series loosely based on the book, starring Amir Wilson.

== Death ==
Dragt died in The Hague on 12 July 2024, at the age of 93.

== Bibliography ==
Title	Year	Translations	Remarks
Verhalen van de tweelingbroers	1961	German, English, Japanese, Spanish	Renamed to De goudsmit en de meesterdief in 15h edition in 2018
De brief voor de koning	1962	Catalan, Czech, Danish, English, Estonian, French, German, Hungarian, Indonesian, Italian, Japanese, Norwegian, Polish (2017), Portuguese, Russian, Spanish, Swedish	
De blauwe boekanier	1964	German	Offered for free as the yearly Kinderboekenweekgeschenk
Geheimen van het Wilde Woud	1965	Danish, German, Japanese, Spanish, English, Hungarian, Polish, Swedish (due 2020)	Sequel to De brief voor de koning
De zevensprong	1966	Danish, German, Japanese, Spanish, English, Hungarian	Later turned into a TV series
De trapeze	1967		Collection of stories
De blauwe maan	1968		A series of 8 short books
Torenhoog en mijlenbreed	1969	German, Czech, Afrikaans	
De torens van februari	1973	English, Spanish, German, Danish	
Water is gevaarlijk	1977		Collection of stories
Het gevaarlijke venster en andere verhalen	1979	German, Spanish	Collection of stories. A follow-up on De brief voor de koning and Geheimen van het Wilde Woud.
Ogen van tijgers	1982	German	Sequel to Torenhoog en mijlenbreed
Het geheim van de klokkenmaker, of De tijd zal het leren, of De tijd zal je leren	1989	German, Spanish	
Aan de andere kant van de deur	1992	German	Sequel to Het geheim van de klokkenmaker: an announced third part hasn't been published thus far.
De robot van de rommelmarkt / Route Z	2001	German, Slovenian	Two stories, one a prequel to Torenhoog en mijlenbreed
De blauwe maansteen	2005	German, Spanish, Japanese	
Het dansende licht	2005		Collection of stories
Wat niemand weet	2007		Illustrated by Annemarie van Haeringen
Dichtbij ver van hier	2009		
Als de sterren zingen	2017		

== Awards ==
- 1963: Kinderboek van het Jaar (Children's book of the Year, the predecessor of the Gouden Griffel) for De brief voor de koning
- 1971: Nienke van Hichtum-prijs for Torenhoog en mijlenbreed
- 1976: Staatsprijs voor kinder- en jeugdliteratuur (the highest award in the Dutch language area for a youth author, can be won only once per author)
- 1995: Buxtehude Bull, an Award for youth literature given by the city of Buxtehude, for the German translation of De torens van Februari
- 2004: Griffel der Griffels for De brief voor de koning (award for the best Dutch children's book of the past fifty years)
- 2005: Victorine Hefting Award, an award for women in The Hague who have contributed to the cultural emancipation of women
