= The Secret Garden (2020 film) =

Film by Marc Munden

- Theatrical release poster
- Directed by: Marc Munden
- Written by: Jack Thorne
- Based on: The Secret Garden; 1911 novel by Frances Hodgson Burnett
- Produced by: David Heyman; Rosie Alison
- Starring: Colin Firth; Julie Walters; Dixie Egerickx; Edan Hayhurst; Amir Wilson
- Cinematography: Lol Crawley
- Edited by: Luke Dunkley
- Music by: Dario Marianelli
- Production companies: StudioCanal; Heyday Films
- Distributed by: Sky
- Release dates: 7 August 2020 (United States); 23 October 2020 (United Kingdom)
- Running time: 100 minutes
- Country: United Kingdom
- Language: English
- Budget: $20 million
- Box office: $8.7 million

The Secret Garden is a 2020 British fantasy drama film based on the 1911 novel of the same name by Frances Hodgson Burnett, the fourth film adaptation. Directed by Marc Munden and adapted by Jack Thorne, it stars Dixie Egerickx, Colin Firth and Julie Walters. Set in 1947 in England, it follows a young orphan who is sent to live with her uncle, only to discover a magical garden at his estate.

The Secret Garden was released via premium video on demand in the United States on 7 August 2020 by STXfilms, and opened in theatres in the United Kingdom on 23 October by Sky, who also released the film on the Sky Cinema channels on the same day.

== Plot ==
In 1947, Mary Lennox is found abandoned in her home in British India, her parents having died from cholera and her having been forgotten in the turmoil of Partition. Mary is sent to her uncle, Archibald Craven's Misselthwaite Manor in Yorkshire, England. She is an unpleasant, unkind young girl who has had to repress her own emotions whilst growing up in the Raj.

Upon arriving, she meets Mrs Medlock, a strict and firm lady who is Mr Craven's housekeeper and servant. Mary is instructed to not explore the house and is confined to her room at night. There, she meets Martha, a servant who is unsettled by her demands.

Mary is allowed to leave the house to explore the estate and woods nearby and stumbles upon a stray dog whom she names Jemima. Later that night, she hears tiny screams and wailings throughout the corridors only to find Mr Craven's bedridden son, Colin Craven.

The next day, Mary meets Mr Craven in his study and he tells her to not cause any trouble. Mary continues exploring and follows Jemima into the mist. When she catches up with Jemima, she finds the dog with its leg caught in a trap. She helps Jemima, freeing her from the trap but the dog runs away. Mary follows and climbs a wall and falls into the secret garden.

Mary is then guided by a Robin to a stone statue within the garden which has a key to the garden within it. She leaves the garden as Mrs Medlock calls out for her. Back at the estate, Mary meets with Colin again as he talks about having a hunchback and not being able to walk. She tells him about the garden on the estate but Colin is uninterested. Snooping around later, she finds a room with pictures of both Mary's mother and Grace Craven, and she grabs a souvenir, a pearl necklace.

The next day, Mary returns to the garden to find Dickon, who offers to help heal Jemima. Mary then brings Colin in his wheelchair for the first time to the same room with his mother's pictures and dresses. Both Mary and Dickon hatch a plan to bring Colin to the garden, hoping to heal his immobility, but upon returning, Mrs Medlock confronts Mary for stealing the pearl necklace and she is punished by being signed up for a boarding school. Later, confined and locked in her room, Mary finds letters between her mother and aunt in a rocking horse. She persuades Colin to read them and the three continue reading letters in the garden.

While lighting a candle, a depressed and distracted Mr Craven sets the desk on fire. The next morning, Mary, Dickon and Colin are in the garden when they see black smoke coming from the house. Colin persuades Mary and Dickon to run to check it out. Mary enters the burning house to find Mr Craven frantically looking for his son in the fire. She tries in vain to convince him to escape as his son is safe outside, but he resists until the ghosts of his wife and Mary's mother guides them out safely as the fire brigade arrives. An anxious Mr Craven and Mrs Medlock go with Mary and Dickon to Colin in the secret garden. Mr Craven gazes in awe at his son's mobility as they rekindle their relationship.

The film ends with Mr Craven rebuilding the estate and Mary, Dickon and Colin having fun in the secret garden.

== Cast ==
- Dixie Egerickx as Mary Lennox
- Colin Firth as Mr Archibald Craven
- Julie Walters as Mrs Medlock
- Edan Hayhurst as Colin Craven
- Amir Wilson as Dickon
- Isis Davis as Martha
- Maeve Dermody as Alice

== Production ==
In 2016, Heyday Films and StudioCanal teamed up to adapt the book into a new movie version, hiring Jack Thorne to write the screenplay.

In 2018, Marc Munden was set to direct. Colin Firth and Julie Walters were cast in April as filming commenced at the end of that month. This is the second time Firth has acted in an adaptation of The Secret Garden, the other version was released 33 years earlier, and was one of Firth's earliest films.

The main front façade of Misselthwaite Manor was filmed at Harlaxton Manor in Lincolnshire.

A lot of the Misselthwaite Manor grounds filming was also done at Duncombe Park, Helmsley Walled Garden, Helmsley Castle, Fountains Abbey and Studley Royal Park in North Yorkshire. The North Yorkshire Moors Railway was also used.

Mary's parents' house in India was filmed at Abbotsbury Subtropical Gardens in Abbotsbury, Dorset. The pool at the house was filmed at the Indian pool of Trematon Castle in Saltash, Cornwall.

Filming also took place within Iford Manor Gardens, in Westwood, Wiltshire, and the Laburnam Arch of Bodnant Garden at Tal-y-Cafn, Conwy, in North Wales. Filming locations also included: Woodhall Estate and Knebworth House, Hertfordshire; Trebah Gardens, Cornwall; Puzzlewood and the Forest of Dean, Gloucestershire; Osterley Park, Greater London; and Pinewood Studios.

== Release ==
The Secret Garden was originally set to be released by StudioCanal UK on 3 April 2020, but two weeks before the release the date was pushed back to 14 August because of the COVID-19 pandemic. In August, Sky purchased the British distribution rights to the film, and released it in the United Kingdom theatrically and on the Sky Cinema channels on 23 October. STX Entertainment handled the American release, distributing it via Premium VOD on 7 August. Global Road Entertainment had initially acquired the North American distribution rights in May 2018, but sold them to STXfilms the following year in March. The Secret Garden was then released on DVD and Blu-Ray by Universal Pictures Home Entertainment on 6 October 2020.

== Reception ==
=== Box office and VOD ===
The film made $139,000 in its opening weekend in Spain, finishing in second.

In its debut weekend in the U.S., the film was the top-rented on Amazon Prime and fifth on FandangoNow. In its second weekend the film fell to seventh on Fandango's charts.

=== Critical response ===
Review aggregator Rotten Tomatoes reported that 68% of 96 reviews of the film were positive, with an average rating of 6.1/10. The website's critics consensus reads: "Faithful in spirit while putting its own spin on the source material, The Secret Garden adds a charming entry to the long list of this beloved book's adaptations". On Metacritic, the film has a weighted average score of 59 out of 100, based on 20 critics, indicating "mixed or average reviews".
