= The Letter for the King =

Dutch literary work

- Author: Tonke Dragt
- Original title: De brief voor de koning
- Translator: Laura Watkinson
- Illustrator: Tonke Dragt
- Cover artist: Tonke Dragt (original)
- Language: Dutch
- Subject: Knight-errant
- Genre: Fantasy; Adventure
- Set in: Middle Ages
- Publisher: Leopold, Pushkin Press
- Publication date: 1962
- Publication place: Netherlands
- English publication date: 2013
- Pages: 339
- Awards: Kinderboek van het Jaar 1963
- Followed by: The Secrets of the Wild Wood

The Letter for the King (Dutch: De brief voor de koning, pronounced [də ˈbri foːr də ˈkoːnɪŋ]) is a children's historical novel by the Dutch writer Tonke Dragt, first published in 1962. Subsequently, The Secrets of the Wild Wood (Dutch: Geheimen van het Wilde Woud), was published in 1965, and a collection of follow-up short stories, The Dangerous Window and other stories (Dutch: Het Gevaarlijke Venster en andere verhalen), in 1979. De brief voor de koning was chosen as the best Dutch youth book of the latter half of the 20th century.

The book has been translated in Danish, English, German, Russian, Greek, Estonian, French, Indonesian, Italian, Japanese, Norwegian, Polish, Portuguese, Czech, Swedish, Spanish and Catalan.

== Background ==
Tonke Dragt took an interest in the Middle Ages from a young age and was especially involved in reading classic English chivalric romances. In the late 1950s and early 1960s, Dragt worked in a secondary school as a drawing teacher. To keep the students' attention, she told short stories and usually stopped telling at a cliffhanger, after which the pupils were allowed to draw accompanying illustrations. Usually, Dragt forgot about these stories soon afterwards while creating new ones.

One day, Dragt told her students about a teenage squire who has to complete all-night vigil before he can receive his knighthood, but leaves the chapel of his vigil to answer a call for help. She said in a De Volkskrant interview:

'Tiuri has to spend his last night as squire, before he can become knight, in a chapel with his friends. He is not allowed to speak or listen to the voices outside. In the middle of the night, a voice desperately whispers "Please, open the door!".' What would you do? I asked my students. Then they had to draw. I drew a map of the Kingdom of Unauwen and next to it the Kingdom of Dagonaut, the countries through which Tiuri travels.

The story grabbed her more than any before and at night, she decided to complete it behind her typewriter.

== Plot overview ==
The Letter for the King is set in a fictional medieval world. In the story, a youth's adventure is externalized in a search for a letter, which results in a discovery of their own persona.

== Synopsis ==
=== The Letter for the King ===
The official map to the novel's setting

In the night before his accolade and ascension to knighthood, which is traditionally spent as a nocturnal vigil in a small chapel, 16-year-old squire Tiuri, son of a famous knight in the realm of Dagonaut, receives a desperate plea for help from a stranger knocking at the chapel door. Unable to refuse a call for help, he breaks the tradition and goes outside, where the stranger, an old man, hands him a sealed letter and begs him to deliver it to a knight clad in black armor and a white shield residing in a nearby forest inn. Tiuri agrees to deliver it, but upon arriving at the inn, he learns to his dismay that the knight he seeks has in the meantime been challenged by another black knight, this one with a red shield. Tracing the path the knights have taken into the forest, Tiuri finds the knight with the white shield dying, mortally wounded in a cowardly ambush. When the knight learns of Tiuri's possession of the letter, he charges him with delivering it to the neighbouring realm of the west, ruled by the wise King Unauwen, and to seek out a hermit named Menaures living in the mountains separating the two kingdoms, who would show him a secret way through the mountains. Bound by his sense of honor, Tiuri accepts the task and the ring the knight gives him in order to stress the importance of his mission, and remains with the knight until he dies.

Soon, however, Tiuri finds himself hunted by riders clad in red, the henchmen of the knight with the red shield, and is forced to flee for his life. In order to speed his progress, he claims the steed of the knight with the white shield, a formidable night-black destrier who accepts him as his new rider. He also finds himself chased by a quartet of knights in grey, who are eager to kill him for unknown reasons, and temporarily loses his horse to a band of robbers, but finds help with the childish but amicable forest-dweller Marius and the monks of a nearby monastery. He eventually makes his way to a castle named Mistrinaut, where he is found and imprisoned for execution by the Grey Knights, who (as it turns out later) were close friends of the knight with the white shield and believe Tiuri to be his murderer. However, Sigirdiwarth Rafox, the lord of Mistrinaut, and his daughter Lavinia supply Tiuri with weapons to save his life, and in the end Tiuri convinces the knights of his innocence and befriends them, especially their leader, Ristridin of the South, a famous wandering knight from Dagonaut's realm.

From Ristridin, Tiuri finally learns the name of the black knight with the white shield - Edwinem of Foresterra, a renowned hero from Unauwen's realm - and of his steed Ardanwen; the stranger who sent Tiuri on his quest turns out to be Edwinem's squire, Vokia. As it is gradually revealed, the murder of Edwinem and the letter Tiuri carries are pivotal elements in a festering conflict between the realm of Unauwen and the realm of Eviellan, a kingdom south of Dagonaut's domain. The ruler of Eviellan is the younger of Unauwen's twin sons, who is torn by jealousy toward his elder brother and, seeking dominion over his father's realm, has conquered Eviellan to support his own ends. Recently, the King of Eviellan has announced that he wants to reconcile with his brother and father. Edwinem was a member of a party of emissaries sent to Eviellan to discuss the terms for the prince's return, but the party went missing, with only Edwinem having been heard of until his murder.

In the company of the Grey Knights, Tiuri survives an ambush attempt by the Red Riders and some hired thugs, and safely reaches the base of the mountains, where he parts company with the knights. As he makes his way to Menaures' abode, he is met by a man called Jaro, who claims to be a pilgrim seeking the hermit's advice, and a short while later Tiuri ends up saving Jaro from a fatal fall into a ravine. Tiuri and Jaro later encounter Menaures and Piak, a young mountain boy whose services as a guide is offered by Menaures after he has learned of Tiuri's quest. Shortly after their departure, Jaro reveals himself to be one of the Red Riders sent to kill him, but since Tiuri has saved his life, Jaro finds himself unable to do him any harm. Before he departs, he warns Tiuri of another Red Rider named Slither who will be waiting for him in Unauwen's realm. Piak, who has overheard the conversation, pledges himself to Tiuri and his errand, and in the days that they spend crossing the mountains, the two become fast friends.

The two boys arrive safely in the realm of Unauwen, but the spies and agents of Eviellan are everpresent. In the city of Dangria, the mayor, an agent and sympathizer to Eviellan, attempts to imprison the boys under false pretenses, but a diversion by Piak allows Tiuri to hide long enough to memorize the contents of the letter and destroy it. While attempting to free Piak, Tiuri receives help from the disgruntled citizens who have long been displeased with the despotic mayor, although only few ever suspected him being an agent of Eviellan. Piak is liberated and the mayor's true allegiance exposed, but not daring to be delayed on their errand, Tiuri and Piak run away before the newly elected provisory town council can question them.

Their next obstacle meets them at the Rainbow River in the form of a castle serving as a toll station. Without money to pay the toll, Tiuri and Piak decide to cross the river by stealth, but end up shipwrecked and captured. When Tirui is brought before Sir Ardian, the local Toll Master, he attempts to bargain for his and Piak's release by offering Edwinem's ring as a deposit. Upon recognizing the ring, and after learning about Edwinem's demise and that Tiuri carries an important message for the king, Sir Ardian promptly provides the two boys with an escort to the capital. Slupor manages to draw away the Custom guards and awaits Tiuri and Piak at the very gates of the capital, but his last-ditch attempt at Tiuri's life is foiled, and he is arrested.

Now able to fulfill their quest, Tiuri and Piak deliver the message the letter contained to King Unauwen. It is later revealed that the letter was a warning about the King of Eviellan's treacherous plans which formed the core of his reconciliation attempt, since he has planned to murder his brother once the realm of Unauwen was lulled into a sense of peace and security, thereby making him the only claimant to the throne. With a heavy heart, Unauwen calls the knights of his realm to arms and rewards Tiuri and Piak for their valiant service to his kingdom.

Soon after, Tiuri and Piak depart for Dagonaut's realm, following the same path they have taken for their outward journey. After arriving at Menaures' abode, Piak, who feels torn between his friendship with Tiuri and his home in the mountains, parts company with Tiuri, who continues his return journey alone. On his way, he meets again with most of his friends and allies, including Ristridin, who invites him to his castle in the coming spring once he and Arwaut have completed an errand for King Dagonaut to explore the Wild Wood, a wild and desolate forest area lining the realm's southern border.

After an uneventful journey, Tiuri returns to the capital of Dagonaut's realm, where he is welcomed back by the king and his family. To Tiuri's immense surprise, and quite against his expectations to the contrary, he subsequently finds himself made a full knight; even though having broken the rules of tradition, Tiuri has proven that he already is a true knight due to his sense of honor, his dedication and compassion in accepting Edwinem's quest as his own. Tiuri's joy is completed when the very next day Piak arrives at the capital, having changed his mind and decided to join Tiuri as his friend and squire.

=== The Secrets of the Wild Wood ===
In the spring of the following year, Tiuri and Piak travel to Castle Ristridin to reunite with Ristridin and the rest of the Grey Knights. However, at the castle they only meet Bendu, along with Ristridin's brother Arturin; Ristridin and Arwaut haven't been heard of since they have captured a band of brigands before their departure for the Wild Wood. After a few days of waiting for news from Ristridin, two knights of Unauwen - Sirs Ewein and Idian, and Unauwen's jester Tirillo - arrive at the castle and bring them news about how Unauwen's army defeated Eviellan after its King's futile attempt to usurp his father's throne through treachery.

The next day, however, two knights from Eviellan, Kraton of Indigo and Melas of Darokitam, seek shelter at the castle, revealing that they - like Unauwen's knights - are envoys, travelling to Dagonaut's capital to beseech the king to form an alliance with their country. Upon hearing of the wait for Ristridin, Kraton mentions a rumor that the knight has allegedly left the Wild Wood and instead went to Deltaland, a province of Eviellan. When Kraton and Melas learn of Sir Idian's presence, they demand to face him; in that confrontation, Idian is revealed as Iridian, crown prince of Unauwen's realm. With his identity revealed, Iridian orders Tirillo to complete his mission to ask King Dagonaut for an alliance and Ewein to wait for Ristridin's return, before he departs the castle; shortly afterwards, the knights of Eviellan also leave.

Tiuri, Piak, Bendu and Ewein leave for Islan, an isolated fortress at the very edge of the Wild Wood, to ask its master, Sir Fitil, about Rsitridin's whereabouts. While taking a rest in a village near the forest, they meet Red Quibo, the local town drunk, who tells them of a strange jousting he witnessed in the Unholy Hills, an area within the Wild Wood; a story which has been dismissed as his usual drunken fantasies. They day after, they arrive at the castle, where Fitil and his beautiful daughter Isadoro tell them that Ristridin had indeed come to Islan during the winter, but left again in short order after reporting that the forest contains nothing of interest. However, Tiuri soon notices that Isadoro is behaving most strangely. During a ride to the Wild Wood with Isadoro, Tirui briefly leaves Ardanwen and is surprised to find flowers weaved into the destrier's bridle upon his return. He later returns to the same spot and discovers Marius lurking between the trees, uncharacteristically frightened. He learns that Marius, along with his brothers, was forcibly drafted by strange men for work in the forest, but he managed to escape; upon seeing his friend Tiuri at Islan, he left the flowers as a signal to him. Tiuri is also baffled when Marius describes a knight he has seen in the woods whose descriptions match Ristridin's.

Tiuri takes Marius back to Islan, but then suddenly news arrive that Dagonaut's realm is being attacked by forces from Deltaland. Bendu and Ewein decide to leave and aid in the defense, while Tiuri and Piak instead accompany Marius to the place where the Fool has seen Ristridin, despite Bendu's disbelief. At said place, Tiuri and Piak discover a message left by Ristridin telling that his entire retinue was slain by enemies hiding in the forest, with him being the only survivor. Realizing that the stories of Ristridin's departure from the Wild Wood are fake and that Sir Fitil must be in cahoots with that enemy, Tiuri decides to leave the forest at once and spread this alarming information. But when Piak briefly separates from his friends, Tiuri and Marius are captured by a band of Men in Green, soldiers from Islan, and Red Riders from Eviellan. They are brought to the leader of the band, the Black Knight with the Red Shield, Sir Edwinem's murderer. Knowing of Tiuri's exploits in Unauwen's interest, the Knight forces him to fight Jaro, the former Red Rider who has unwittingly fallen back into the hands of his old master after parting from Tiuri in Menaures' mountains. Tiuri beats Jaro, but refuses to kill him; then the Knight takes him and Marius to the Tarnburg, a ruined castle deep within the woods, and locks them into a secure room. But before that happens, Jaro slips them a file and a message that he will free them on the third night from thence.

Some time after that, the Black Knight enters the cell and challenges Tirui to a game of chess. After winning a match, Tirui makes the Knight unmask himself, revealing him to be Prince Iridian's twin brother, the King of Eviellan. As they continue playing, the Black Knight freely divulges that his presence in the forest is the prelude to a massive two-pronged attack against Unauwen's realm from two sides - one from the south, the other from a long overgrown road and a forgotten mountain pass hidden by the Wild Wood. He tries to draw Tiuri to his side, but the latter refuses; and during an interlude, the Knight tries to subjugate Ardanwen, but the destrier escapes. Finally, on the third night, Tiuri and Marius escape their cell and are joined by Jaro. Pursued by the Black Knight's soldiers, they reluctantly flee into the territory of the Men in Green, who are supposedly allied with Eviellan. To the fugitives' surprise, the Men in Green hinder the soldiers of Eviellan in following their quarry, and they are guided to Tehalon, the Master of the Wild Wood and ruler of the Men in Green. From him, Tiuri and his companions learn that Tehalon only tolerates Eviellan's presence in the Wild Wood because he and his tribe are neutral towards the affairs of the outer world, and they hope that the Black Knight and his followers will leave them alone if left unmolested. However, when the King of Eviellan personally approaches Tehalon to demand the surrender of the fugitives, the Master of the Wild Wood lies to him by claiming that the three will be sacrificed to the forest spirits.

In the meantime, Piak eludes the ambush by the Eviellans and tries to find his way back to civilization. Hounded by the soldiers of Islan, tired and feverish, he stumbles into the camp of Adelbart, a drifter and former member of the bandit gang which Ristridin has smashed. After nursing Piak back to health, and after hearing his story, Adelbart escorts him to the Brown Monastery, where the abbot immediately sends messages to King Dagonaut and summons Sir Rafox. Among the entourage from Mistrinaut, Piak finds Rafox's daughter Lavinia, who has disguised herself to participate in the rescue. The abbot volunteers Brother Martin as a guide, and upon his insistence Adelbart also joins the expedition. When they enter the Wild Wood, the Men in Green send drum signals warning Eviellan and Tehalon of their approach. Upon a slip of tongue on his part, Adelbart is made to reveal that he had once lived with the Men in Green for a time after his wanderings led him into their realm, and offers to act as an emissary for the group. Joined by Lavinia, Adelbart and Piak make their way to Tehalon, finding Ardanwen on the way. They are later reunited with their friends, and Sir Rafox is summoned for a council of war. To thwart Eviellan, Sir Rafox decides to stay in the woods to hold the enemy as best he can, while Tiuri and Piak are guided by Tehalon to the hidden pass to deliver the warning to Unauwen's realm, using a legendary gong hidden in the mountains, before Eviellan attacks. While Tiuri is wounded by an agent of Eviellan, he reaches the gong and sounds the alert, thus foiling the Black Knight's attack from the mountains.

At the same time, it is revealed that Ristridin is still alive and was a prisoner in Islan when Tiuri and his companions had arrived. With Piak's escape, however, Sir Fitil has finally realized that his efforts to keep Eviellan's presence in the Wild Wood secret are futile, and he and Isadoro release the knight. Hurrying back to his castle, Ristridin encounters Quibo, who recognizes him and so forces Ristridin to draft him as his new squire to stop him from spreading the news of his return too soon. The two also run into Sir Kraton; when Kraton becomes suspicious of Ristridin, the latter duels and defeats Kraton, forcing him to accompany him back to his home. Once there, Ristridin reveals himself and swiftly prepares his forces for a campaign against the enemy in the Wild Wood. He is soon joined by Tiuri's father, who has been looking for his son, and together they arrive just in time to relieve Sir Rafox. After the Black Knight had set the Wild Wood on fire to punish Tehalon for his aid to Tiuri, the Men in Green join the fight against Eviellan. However, the Black Knight and a number of his followers escape into the Unholy Hills and engage in a guerilla war, striking at the outposts of civilization bordering the forest. He also sends a force to destroy Islan; Sir Fitil dies defending his castle, but Isadoro continues the fight and succeeds in repelling the enemy.

Led by Quibo, Tiuri, Ristridin and their friends ride into the Unholy Hills to demand the Black Knight's surrender, but the King of Eviellan instead demands a duel with his brother to settle their feud once and for all. The duel is fought, and Prince Iridian triumphs, killing his brother. However, the King of Eviellan has wounded his brother with a poisoned sword, and Iridian dies within the hour. After the conflict is thus concluded, Tiuri and Piak pay a visit to Menaures in the mountains and find him in the company of a young boy named Idian - Prince Iridian's son, who was sent to live with his granduncle to learn how to rule his future kingdom wisely.

== Characters ==
=== Realm of Dagonaut ===
Name	Description
Tiuri	The story's main protagonist, a 16-year-old squire in the realm of Dagonaut.
Piak	A 14-year-old orphan mountain boy with brown hair and eyes who becomes Tiuri's best friend.
Ristridin of the South	The leader of the Grey Knights, and a famous wandering knight in Dagonaut's realm. While he has a fiefdom located to the south of the kingdom (close to Evielan's northern border), it is administered by his brother Arturin.
Bendu	A gruff member of the Grey Knights who is slow to trust, but is a steadfast friend and ally once his confidence has been earned.
Sigirdiwarth Rafox	The lord of Castle Mistrinaut, a small fortress near the western border of Dagonaut's realm. A wanderer from the northern realm of Azular Northa, he slew the former evil lord of the castle and was granted his lands by King Dagonaut.
Lavinia Rafox	The black-haired daughter of Sir Rafox who becomes Tiuri's love interest.
Arwaut	A younger member of the Grey Knights and Bendu's nephew.
Marius	Also called "the Fool in the Forest", this child-minded but friendly man lives in a forest in Dagonaut's realm with his mother and brothers.
The Monks of the Brown Monastery	An order of monks named for their brown habits who help Tiuri on his quest. Known members include Father Hyronimus the abbot, Brother Martin, and Brother Julius the gatekeeper.
Menaures	Originally King Unauwen's twin brother, he refused to quarrel with his brother over the crown and retreated to the eastern side of the mountain range separating the realms of Dagonaut and Unauwen, where he lives as a hermit, dispensing counsel to pilgrims.
Ardanwen	Edwinem's and later Tiuri's steed, a black destrier fiercely loyal to his chosen master.
King Dagonaut	The ruler of the eastern realm bearing his name, he is younger and sterner than Unauwen, but also just and considerate.
Tiuri the Valiant	Tiuri's father and a renowned knight in Dagonaut's realm.
Sir Fitil	A knight and the lord of Islan, a castle at the edge of the Wild Wood.
Lady Isadoro	Fitil's beautiful daughter.
Tehalon	The hermetic Master of the Wild Wood and the leader of the Men in Green, a tribe living in the Wild Wood who are believed to be mythical creatures.
Red Quibo	A young man from a village near the Wild Wood, and the local town drunk.
Adelbart	An unsettled but kind-hearted vagabond.

=== Realm of Unauwen ===
Name	Description
King Unauwen	The elderly but wise and kind ruler of the western realm bearing his name.
Prince Iridian	The elder of Unauwen's twin sons and the realm's crown prince.
Edwinem of Forresterra	A paladin of the realm of Unauwen, who bears the title "The Invincible". Killed during his mission to expose the Lord of Evielan's scheme, he entrusts his quest to Tiuri with his dying breath.
Tirillo	King Unauwen's jester of indeterminable age and great wisdom, who is also a paladin of the realm.
Ardian	A paladin of Unauwen's kingdom and one of the seven Toll Masters at the Rainbow River, the original eastern border of Unauwen's realm before it expanded to the edge of the eastern mountains.
Ewein	A younger member of the Grey Knights, and the only one not from Dagonaut's realm. His older brother Iwein is also a knight at Dagonaut's court. In English their names are spelled Evan and Ivan, respectively.
Vokia	The elderly squire of Sir Edwinem who sets Tiuri on his fateful quest, and dies shortly after hearing of his master's death.

=== Eviellan ===
Name	Description
The Black Knight with the Red Shield	The story's unnamed main antagonist. His true identity is revealed in The Secrets of the Wild Wood.
Jaro	A member of the Red Riders who serve the Lord of Eviellan, but who proves to be an honorable soul.
Kraton of Indigo	A proud knight of Eviellan who is loyal to his Lord, but is actually a man of honor.
Slupor	A vile and cunning member of the Red Riders and master of disguise, whose most recognizable features are his snake-like eyes. In the English version, he is called Slither.

== Reception ==
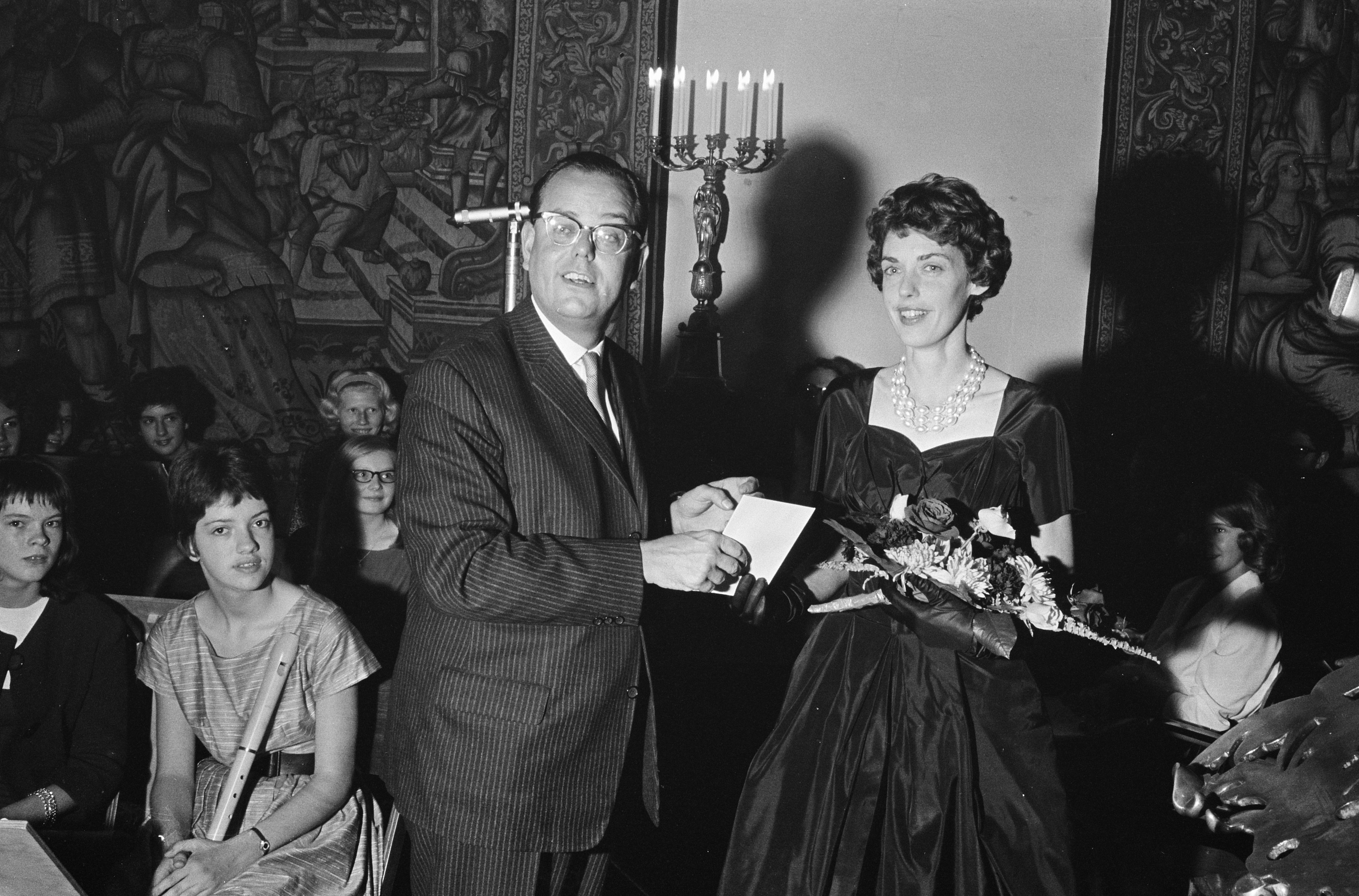
Tonke Dragt receives the Children's Book of the Year award in 1963

=== Critical reception ===
==== 1962 reception ====
In line with her debut, De brief voor de koning was received very well by critics. Multiple reviewers noted the book's romantic tendencies. A Trouw journalist carrying the initial J.H. called Dragt "capable" and her novel a "beautiful book". Reviewer W. Hora Adema of Het Parool put it on the list of children's books to buy for Sinterklaas, calling it "romantic". A reviewer of De Friese Koerier was however sceptical about the potential success of the book, saying that only boys who had a feeling for "romantic knighthood" would enjoy it in 1962. A reviewer in Algemeen Handelsblad liked the setting on the other hand, calling it the novel a "fascinating and atmospherically written book". A De Maasbode journalist suggested that the book could have perhaps been influenced by Tolkien's The Lord of the Rings and called the characters "appealing" and De brief voor de koning overall an "interesting, charming book, modern through its clarity of imagination".

De brief voor de koning was crowned as the Best Children's Book of the Year in 1963 by CPNB. One year prior to that, with Verhalen van de tweelingbroers, she just lost out the prize to Jean Dulieu's Paulus de hulpsinterklaas. In 2004, De brief voor de koning won the Griffel der Griffels for best children's book published between 1954 and 2004, beating amongst others Thea Beckman's Kruistocht in spijkerbroek and two books by Paul Biegel.

==== 2013 reception of its English translation ====
In 2013, British translator Laura Watkinson translated the book for Pushkin Press. This translation received positive feedback from British critics. The Guardian's Philip Womack wrote: "The book is beautifully constructed, and has passages of urgent writing that take their inspiration from fairytales as well as the Arthurian legend."

Irish Times journalist Eileen Battersby wrote: "This is a fast-moving, wonderful old-style adventure written in a solemn, deliberate and descriptive prose."

=== Public reception ===
De brief voor de koning has sold over 1 million copies. The book has been translated many times. In 2018, the book reached its fiftieth edition in print.

== Adaptations ==
In 2007, it premiered as a musical theater piece. This was the second theater production based on the works of Tonke Dragt, after an adaptation of De Zevensprong.

A film based on the book, starring Derek de Lint, was released in the summer of 2008.

A Netflix series was released on March 20, 2020. It featured several alterations greatly deviating from the original stories, such as the inclusion of magic, an altered background story for Tiuri, an enhanced emphasis on Lavinia's role, and several original characters.

== Awards ==
- 1963: Kinderboek van het Jaar (Children's book of the Year, the predecessor of the Gouden Griffel) for De brief voor de koning
- 2004: Griffel der Griffels for De brief voor de koning (award for the best Dutch children's book of the past fifty years)

== Literary sources ==
- Tonke Dragt: De brief voor de Koning, 1962.
