= The Letter for the King (TV series) =

2020 TV series

- Genre: Fantasy
- Based on: The Letter for the King by Tonke Dragt
- Written by: Will Davies
- Directed by: Alex Holmes; Felix Thompson
- Starring: Amir Wilson; Ruby Ashbourne Serkis; Thaddea Graham; Gijs Blom
- Composer: Brandon Campbell
- Countries of origin: United Kingdom; Netherlands
- Original language: English
- No. of seasons: 1
- No. of episodes: 6

Production
- Executive producers: Will Davies; Paul Trijbits
- Producer: Chris Clark
- Production locations: New Zealand; Czech Republic
- Production company: FilmWave

Original release
- Network: Netflix
- Release: 20 March 2020

The Letter for the King is a coming-of-age fantasy adventure television series developed by Will Davies and FilmWave for Netflix inspired by the classic 1962 Dutch novel of the same name by Tonke Dragt. The six-episode series was released on Netflix on 20 March 2020.

== Premise ==
A young aspiring knight Tiuri (Amir Wilson) finds himself on a perilous mission to deliver a secret letter to the King who lives across the Great Mountains.

== Cast ==
- Amir Wilson as Tiuri
- Ruby Ashbourne Serkis as Lavinia
- Thaddea Graham as Iona
- Islam Bouakkaz as Arman
- Jonah Lees as Jussipo
- Jack Barton as Foldo
- Nathanael Saleh as Piak
- Gijs Blom as Prince Viridian
- Emilie Cocquerel as Queen Alianor
- Peter Ferdinando as Jaro

=== Recurring and supporting ===
- Kemi-Bo Jacobs as Darya
- David Wenham as Sir Tiuri the Valiant
- Omid Djalili as Sir Fantumar
- Ken Nwosu as Ristridin
- Yorick van Wageningen as King Favian
- Jakob Oftebro as Prince Iridian
- Tawfeek Barhom as Jabroot
- Moshidi Motshegwa

=== Notable guests ===
- Jóhannes Haukur Jóhannesson as Bors
- Ben Chaplin as The Black Knight
- Fionn O'Shea as Tristan
- Andy Serkis as Mayor of Mistrinaut
- Kim Bodnia as Abbot
- David Wilmot as Slupor
- Lisa Loven Kongsli as Shona
- Peter McCauley as General
- Scroobius Pip as Grey Rider

== Episodes ==
No.	Title	Directed by	Written by	Original release date
1	"Storm Clouds Gather"	Felix Thompson	Will Davies	March 20, 2020
Tiuri, a young squire in the Kingdom of Dagonaut, enters the trials for novice knights. During the final challenge, the novices spend a night of silent contemplation inside the tomb of the Knights of Dagonaut, which is haunted by the spirits of the fallen knights. The vigil is interrupted by a dying Black Knight, who has stolen a sealed letter from Prince Viridian’s Red Riders. The Black Knight makes Tiuri swear to deliver the letter and his ring to King Favian of Unauwen before the next full moon, in 14 days. Tiuri is pursued on horseback by the Red Riders. The Black Knight’s horse, Ardanwen, leaps off a cliff carrying Tuiri into the river below.
2	"Isn't She a Sweetheart?"	Alex Holmes	Will Davies	March 20, 2020
With the Red Riders and Novices hot on his trail, Tiuri makes his way to Mistrinaut, where the mayor’s daughter, an adventurous teen named Lavina, reluctantly forced to marry a paranoid, rich boy, discovers his presence. Despite convincing him to trust her, she has him imprisoned for money from bounty hunters. The knight leading the trials is the first to pay for him, but the mayor's daughter, in need of passage out of the town, frees him as the Novices arrive in Mistrinaut. The Novices, the knights, and the Red Riders end up chasing them, and a battle ensues. The lead knight sacrifices himself to distract them from Tiuri and dies of his wounds, but not before telling the Novices to help Tiuri on his quest. As they are considering this, the Novices are captured by the Red Riders.
3	"At the End of the World"	Felix Thompson	Rose Heiney	March 20, 2020
The Red Riders drive their captives high into the snowy mountains. Caught in a storm, Tiuri and Lavinia take shelter inside an ominous monastery.
4	"Danger Knights"	Alex Holmes	Harry Cripps	March 20, 2020
On a ship headed toward Unauwen, Tiuri and Lavinia meet a mysterious passenger who seems to know the secret of Tiuri's past — and his destiny.
5	"Spiral"	Charles Martin	Joy C. Mitchell	March 20, 2020
Ardanwen guides the group to an eerily empty town. Lavinia helps Tiuri practice controlling his powers, and in order to get his heart rate up, she kisses him. The two then start a romance. A startling discovery divides the Novices as they enter their kingdom.
6	"When the Blood Moon Rises"	Felix Thompson	Will Davies	March 20, 2020
As the Blood Moon nears and Viridian prepares for his homecoming, Tiuri and friends wrestle with doubt, betrayal and a daunting final test. In the final battle, the knights and Viridian clash. Viridian unleashes his plan and turns into a demon, but Lavinia, directed by Tiuri, defeats him. Jussipo is killed in the ensuing battle, and they bury him before being knighted. Jussipo's brother becomes the youngest knight in Dragonaut, and Tiuri becomes Sir Tiuri the Valiant. The show ends when, as the audience applause, magic returns to the kingdom.

== Production ==
=== Development ===
In July 2018, it was announced Netflix had ordered an original series based on Tonke Dragt's De brief voor de Koning with Will Davies as showrunner and executive producer. This is the first Netflix adaptation of a Dutch book, although it will be adapted in English; the series is titled after the English translation, which was published in 2014. FilmWave acquired the international rights in a deal with Leopold. Paul Trijbits of FilmWave is executive producing, Chris Clark is producing, and Alex Holmes and Felix Thompson are directing.

=== Casting ===
The cast was announced in December 2018 with Amir Wilson in the lead role.

=== Filming ===
Principal photography took place in New Zealand and Prague, Czech Republic.

=== Music ===
Brandon Campbell composed the music for the series. "It’s an orchestral, adventure score, but we wove in a lot of Western elements. There are acoustic guitars, some vocals, the fiddle, and trumpet. Our approach to this project, and our vision as it came together, was a Western that takes place in the middle of this magical adventure," he told Awards Daily.

Jussipo uses the score of "In Hell, I'll Be in Good Company" from the band "The Dead South" as music for his songs, this music is also sung for his burial.

== Release ==
First-look promotional pictures were released in January 2020 followed by a teaser and trailer in February.

== Reception ==
=== Critical reception ===
On Rotten Tomatoes, the series has an approval rating of 60% based on reviews from 20 critics, with an average rating of 6.69/10. The website's critical consensus reads: "The Letter for the King aspires for greatness, but poor pacing stretched across too many episodes hinder what could be an epic journey." On Metacritic, the series has a score of 55 out of 100 based on reviews from 6 critics, indicating "mixed or average reviews".

==== Anglophone reception ====
Jack Seale of The Guardian, in awarding the series 3 out of 5 stars, wrote: "But while The Letter for the King doesn’t feel like an adults’ show that kids can get away with watching, it's also not a kids’ show that's fun enough for adults to enjoy, with its bowdlerised fights and romance." David Opie of Digital Spy gave it 2 out of 5 stars and wrote: "Unfortunately, The Letter For The King is not the new fantasy smash we were hoping for, so you can toss out any high expectations you might have like a coin to your Witcher. In fact, it's not even that great for fans of the book either.".

The Letter for the King was frequently dubbed as a Game of Thrones for children. Patrick Cremona of Radio Times gave it 2 out of 5 stars and wrote: "The show is watchable enough, and might serve as a useful way into medieval fantasy for younger audiences who aren’t yet ready for the more adult-orientated series that have recently dominated the genre, which is by no means a bad thing. It seems unlikely, however, that this is the next big fantasy series that Netflix might have hoped for. The hunt for the next Game of Thrones goes on…".

==== Dutch reception ====
Although the series topped the Netflix ratings in the Netherlands, it also received very mixed critical reviews, mostly directed towards the execution of the series based on the book by Dragt. Mark Moorman of De Volkskrant awarded the show 3 out of 5 stars and commented: "With nice young actors, beautiful cinematography and a strong quest, The Letter for the King is a reasonable success. But it does feel a bit like Netflix has crushed our favourite children's book with a steam engine." Belinda van de Graaf of Trouw also awarded the series 3 out of 5 stars and wrote: "In their dedication to inclusivity, the creators went even further. Tiuri's most important companion is no longer a boy (Piak) but a girl, Lavinia. And near the end, there is an intimate kiss between two trainees. Sweet, that kiss between two guys, but that scene just appeared out of thin air. The same counts for all the hocus pocus that the creators added. It's understandable why Tonke Dragt prefers talking about literary adaptions of her book, rather than visual adaptions."

=== Awards and nominations ===
Year	Award	Category	Nominee	Result	Ref.
2021	Daytime Emmy Awards	Outstanding Lead Actor in a Daytime Fiction Program	Gijs Blom	Nominated	
2021	Daytime Emmy Awards	Outstanding Younger Performer in a Daytime Fiction Program	Amir Wilson	Nominated	
2021	Daytime Emmy Awards	Outstanding Guest Performer in a Daytime Fiction Program	Andy Serkis	Won	
2021	Daytime Emmy Awards	Outstanding Directing Team for a Daytime Fiction Program	The Letter for the King	Won	
2021	Daytime Emmy Awards	Outstanding Cinematography	The Letter for the King	Nominated	
2021	Daytime Emmy Awards	Outstanding Art Direction / Set Design for a Drama or Daytime Fiction Program	Brendan Heffernan	Nominated	
2021	Daytime Emmy Awards	Outstanding Single Camera Editing	The Letter for the King	Won	
2021	Daytime Emmy Awards	Outstanding Special Effects	The Letter for the King	Nominated	
2021	Daytime Emmy Awards	Outstanding Hairstyling for a Drama or Daytime Fiction Program	Frances Hounsom	Won	
2021	Daytime Emmy Awards	Outstanding Makeup for a Drama or Daytime Fiction Program	Frances Hounsom	Nominated	
2021	Daytime Emmy Awards	Outstanding Music Direction and Composition for a Daytime Program	Brandon Campbell	Won	
2021	Daytime Emmy Awards	Outstanding Sound Mixing and Editing for a Drama or Daytime Fiction Program	Howard Bargroff	Won	
