= Edan Hayhurst =

English actor

- Born: 2005 (age 20–21)
- Occupation: Actor
- Years active: 2016-present

Edan Hayhurst is an English actor. He is best known for his roles as Ben Yates in the British comedy-drama television series There She Goes and Colin Craven in the 2020 British fantasy drama film The Secret Garden.

== Career ==
Hayhurst made his acting debut in the 2016 short film It Would Change Everything. In 2017 he plays a ten year old Hans Albert Einstein in the American anthology period drama television series Genius. Between 2018 and 2020, he played the role of Ben Yates in the British comedy-drama television series, There She Goes, he plays Rosie's older brother, a well-behaved boy, his needs are often overshadowed by Rosie. In 2019 he appeared in the action-adventure horror stealth game A Plague Tale: Innocence, he provides the voice of Lucas. In 2020 he made his feature film debut in the British fantasy drama film The Secret Garden, he plays Colin Craven, Lord Archibald Craven's (Colin Firth) son. He plays one of Mitchell's (Kyle Chandler) sons in the 2020 American science fiction film The Midnight Sky.

== Filmography ==
=== Films ===
| Year | Title | Role | Notes |
|---|---|---|---|
| 2016 | It Would Change Everything | Young Bruce | Short film |
| 2020 | The Secret Garden | Colin Craven | |
| 2020 | The Right Bus | Danny Renton | |
| 2020 | The Midnight Sky | Boy | |
| 2021 | The Right Bus | Danny Renton | |

=== Television ===
| Year | Title | Role | Notes |
|---|---|---|---|
| 2017 | Genius | Hans Albert Einstein (Age 10) | 2 episodes |
| 2018–2023 | There She Goes | Ben Yates | 2 series |
| 2021 | Leonardo | Giangaleazzo Sforza | 2 episodes |
| 2021 | Arcane | Young Victor (voice) | 1 episode |

=== Video games ===
| Year | Title | Role | Notes |
|---|---|---|---|
| 2019 | A Plague Tale: Innocence | Lucas (voice) | |
| 2023 | Final Fantasy XVI | Additional voices | |

== Awards and nominations ==
| Year | Award | Category | Work | Result | Ref. |
|---|---|---|---|---|---|
| 2020 | NAVGTR Awards | Performance in a Drama, Supporting | A Plague Tale: Innocence | Nominated | |
