= The Letter for the King (film) =

2008 film by Pieter Verhoeff

- Theatrical release poster
- De Brief voor de Koning
- Directed by: Pieter Verhoeff
- Screenplay by: Maarten Lebens; Pieter Verhoeff
- Based on: De brief voor de Koning by Tonke Dragt
- Produced by: Armada Productions; Eyeworks Egmond
- Starring: Yannick van de Velde; Quinten Schram
- Cinematography: Jules van den Steenhoven
- Edited by: Bart van den Broek
- Music by: Erwin Roodhardt
- Distributed by: Benelux Film Distributors
- Release date: 16 July 2008
- Running time: 110 minutes
- Country: Netherlands
- Language: Dutch
- Budget: €7.5 million
- Box office: $2.8 million

The Letter for the King (Dutch: De Brief voor de Koning, pronounced [də ˈbri foːr də ˈkoːnɪŋ]) is a 2008 Dutch adventure film written by Maarten Lebens and Pieter Verhoeff and directed by Verhoeff.

The film is based on the 1962 book of the same name by Dutch writer Tonke Dragt. In 1963 the book won the Dutch award Best Youth Book of the Year; in 2004 it was named the Best Youth Book of the past 50 years. Over a million copies of the book have been sold to date.

The filming of The Letter for the King took place from November 2007 till early March 2008, on locations in Germany (Eisenach and Engelskirchen), Luxembourg (Vianden), Belgium and the Netherlands. A 6 part TV adaptation of the novel also exists (2020), with significant plot differences.

== Plot ==
In the land of Dagonaut a medieval squire named Tiuri and four other squires spend their last night before being knighted inside the chapel without chatting, sleeping, or eating. This is their last test in order to become a knight. But suddenly a badly wounded knight knocks on the door looking for help. Tiuri abandons the rules and opens the door. The knight asks him to deliver an important letter to the king of Unauwen. The dying knight, Edwinem, gives him a special ring as a proof that he was sent by the knight.

During his journey, Tiuri passes through the land of Grey Knights, where bandits rove. He loses his horse to the bandits and continues his travel without it, but keeps the special ring that was given to him by Edwinem.

In the Mistrinaut castle, Tiuri is put in prison and is fighting with the so-called Grey Knights who suspect him for the murder of Edwinem, although the real culprits are Red Riders. The maiden Lavinia saves him by convincing her father, head of the castle, that Tiuri is innocent. Then, her father helps Tiuri on his mission by sending him some Grey Knights to accompany him on the next part of his journey.

On the way, Tiuri meets someone who is on pilgrimage without knowing that he is actually a Red Rider spy. But when the Red Rider's life is in danger, Tiuri saves him, and the Red Rider has a change of heart.

Then Tiuri goes to a hermit named Menaures. Menaures sends his boy Piak as Tiuri's guide.

After traveling for a bit, Tiuri and Piak struggle with people who pose a threat to the safety of the letter, Tiuri opens the letter and memorises what is written on it. After that, he burns the letter so that no one can read it. However, Tiuri does not know what the message on the letter means because the message is written in a different language. Piak helps him to remember it by making it into a song.

Later, Tiuri and Piak have to cross the bridge over the Rainbow River, but they have to pay a toll to do so. They don't have the money to pay for the toll, so they find an alternate route. Piak accidentally falls into the Rainbow River, but Tiuri saves him from drowning. They are then caught by a guard, and they explain to him their mission. The special ring helps with their explanation when they show it to the operatives.

Tiuri fortunately completes his mission, and delivers the letter to the king of Unauwen. The content of the letter is that the country is in danger because the enemy kingdom Eviellan have a plot against the country. Tiuri is honoured by the king for successfully bringing the message to him.

== Cast ==
- Yannick van de Velde as Tiuri
- Quinten Schram as Piak
- Rüdiger Vogler as King of Unauwen / Menaures
- Hanna Schwamborn as Lavinia
- Lars Rudolph as Slupor
- Victor Reinier as Gray Knight Ristridin
- Daan Schuurmans as Gray Knight Bendoe
- Raymond Thiry as Tiuri the Brave
- Derek de Lint as King of Dagonaut
- Gijs Scholten van Aschat as Knight Edwinem
- Kees Boot as Jaro
- Hans Dagelet as Warmin
- Michiel Romeyn as Rover Chief
- Monic Hendrickx as Mother of Tiuri
- Uwe Ochsenknecht as Lord Rafox

== Awards ==
The film was awarded as the best film at the thirteenth International Film Festival for Children and Young Audience in both the international jury and the youth jury in October 2008. In the same month and in the same year, the film was awarded in a German town Marburg on the Final Cut Film Festival. The film also received the Golden Film, awarded by the Netherlands Film Festival and the Netherlands Film Fund on 30 July 2008 for reaching 100,000 tickets sold.
