= Amir Wilson =

English actor (born 2004)

- Born: Amir Wilson; 6 February 2004 (age 22); Shrewsbury, Shropshire, England
- Occupation: Actor
- Years active: 2015–present

Amir Wilson (born 6 February 2004) is an English actor. On television, he is known for his roles as Will Parry in the HBO and BBC One series His Dark Materials (2019–2022) and Tiuri in the Netflix series The Letter for the King (2020). He starred in the 2020 film adaptation of The Secret Garden.

== Early and personal life ==
Wilson was born in Shrewsbury, Shropshire to English father, Paul, and Sudanese mother, Nagla. He has an older sister, Iman. He grew up in the suburb of Monkmoor, attending St. Giles' C of E Primary School. Wilson began acting and training with local theatre group Get Your Wigle On.

His father died in May 2018.

== Filmography ==
=== Film ===
Year	Title	Role	Notes
2019	The Kid Who Would Be King	Boy	Uncredited
2020	The Secret Garden	Dickon	
2022	The Magic Flute	Anton Milanesi	
2024	The Return	Philoetius	

=== Television ===
Year	Title	Role	Notes
2019–2022	His Dark Materials	William "Will" Parry	Main role; 19 episodes
2020	The Letter for the King	Tiuri	Main role; 6 episodes
2024	The Famous Five	Charlie Vincent / Cab Vee	Episode: "Mystery at the Prospect Hotel"

== Stage ==
Year	Title	Role	Notes
2015	The Lion King	Young Simba (shared)	Lyceum Theatre, London
2017	The Secret Diary of Adrian Mole Aged 13¾	Nigel	Menier Chocolate Factory, London

== Awards and nominations ==
Year	Award	Category	Work	Result	Ref.
2021	Daytime Emmy Awards	Younger Performer in a Daytime Fiction Program	The Letter for the King	Nominated	
