= Journade =

Medieval garment

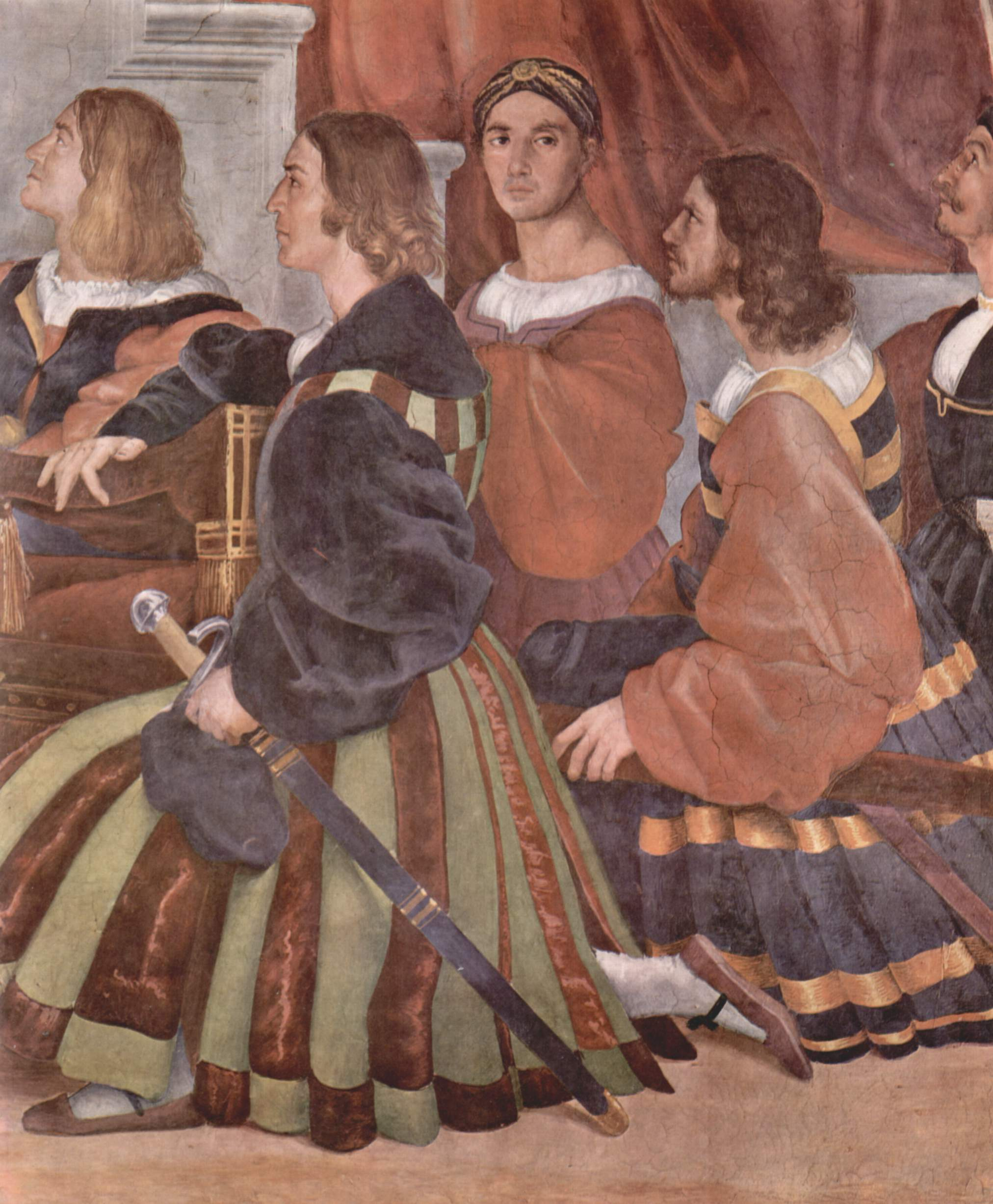
The Swiss Guard at the Vatican wearing full-skirted giornea or jerkins and full sleeves over low-necked shirts or chemises, 1512

Journade (France) or Giornea (Italy) is a sideless overgown or tabard. It was usually pleated and was worn hanging loose or belted. Young men wore them short and older men wore them calf- or ankle-length.

The Complete Costume Dictionary by Elizabeth J. Lewandowski describes the journade as a "short, circular garment worn for riding. Initially it had large, full sleeves and later it had long, slit sleeves."

== See also ==
- 1400–1500 in European fashion
- 1500–50 in Western European fashion
