= Alexander Rea (organist) =

English clergyman and organist in Australia

Alexander Rea (April 1830 – 13 March 1909), commonly referred to as Alex Rea, was an English clergyman who had a career as an organist in Australia. He was responsible for ordering the Sydney Town Hall Grand Organ and supervising its construction.

== History ==
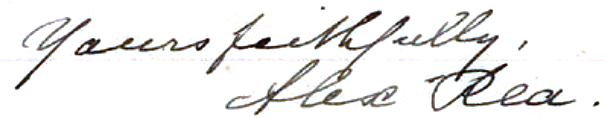
Signature

Rea was born in the North of England, third son of a clergyman of the Moravian Church. At age 15 he won a scholarship which took him to Germany, where, at the Moravian College, he studied divinity and music for seven years. Returning to England he was ordained, and worked among the Moravians in Fetter Lane, London, in Leominster, Herefordshire, and Fairfield Moravian Church, in Droylsden, Manchester. At age thirty he met and married Susan Ryall Lucas. (Note: Some years later, her mother followed them to Sydney. She died at their home on 16 September 1871.)

=== Move to Australia ===
Shortly after his marriage he accepted a call from the Congregational Church at Balmain, and left England for Melbourne in the steamer Marco Polo, arriving 11 March 1862, settling in Balmain in April. After about two years as pastor his voice began to fail, so he resigned from the ministry (Note: Curiously, he retained his licence to marry.) and from 1864 to 1868 taught German and Instrumental Music at Camden College. From 1867 he advertised his services as a teacher of pianoforte and singing at their home, "Essington", (Note: Mrs Rea operated a private school from their home in 1870, also taught singing and music theory. Later two daughters ran a school at the family home.) in Newtown, and Rea became acknowledged one of Sydney's musical authorities. He briefly had a studio at 215 Macquarie Street, Sydney.

The Misses Hogg ran a school at "Darlington House", Newtown Road, Darlinghurst, 1873–1880. Rea was advertised as teaching music there 1874–1876.

=== Sydney Town Hall ===
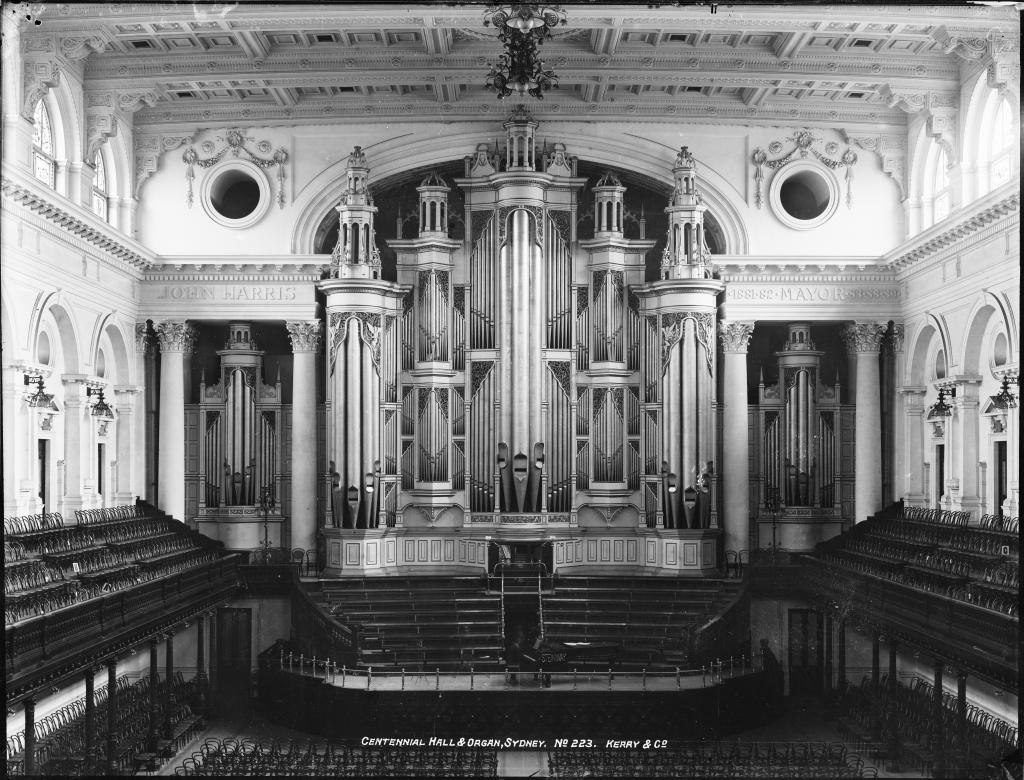
Town Hall organ

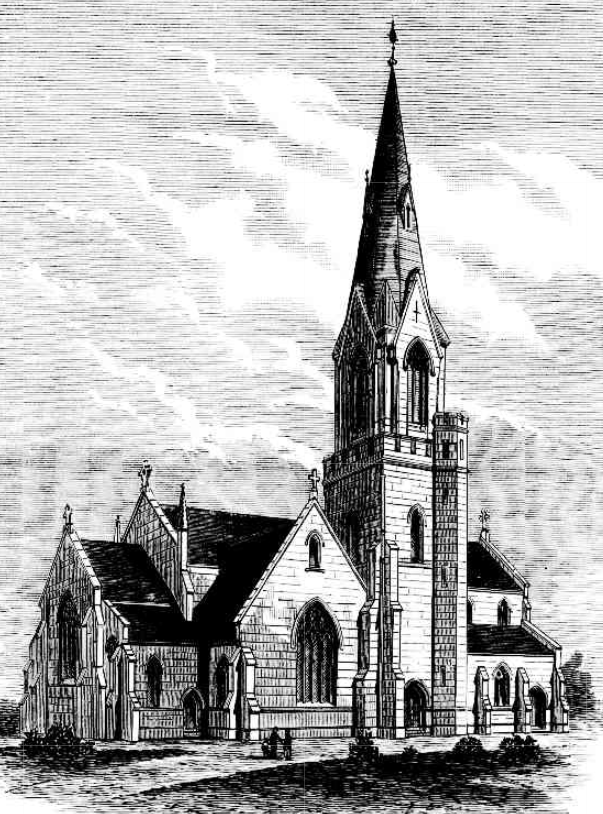
St Stephen's, Newtown, 1881

When the City Council decided to commission "the world's greatest organ" for the Sydney Town Hall, Rea was closely involved in formulating the process for achieving a transparent and defensible decision. They assembled a committee of ten, led by Montague Younger, with Rea as secretary, to compile a set of specifications, call for tenders for both manufacture and erection, and select the successful tenders. The committee comprised five organists, two architects and three organ builders, all Sydney men. From a shortlist of eleven manufacturers they selected two deemed capable of doing the work, then awarded the contract to William Hill and Son, an outcome which may have been expected, given the company's dominance. Rea was made chief negotiator, dealing directly with Hill and Son.

Sydney's first Town Organist, Auguste Wiegand, later blamed Rea for certain shortcomings in the design, but was contradicted by Hill, who praised the "Corporation of Sydney, ... they left all details in our hands."

Rea supervised erection of the instrument in the Centennial Hall, and tested the mechanism before the famous organist W. T. Best 'opened' the organ in August 1890 and, when Best returned to England, Rea gave a number of recitals at the Town Hall. He also supervised access to the huge instrument until the appointment of Wiegand as City Organist. Several compositions by Rea were played on the great organ by Wiegand and his successors Arthur Mason, Edwin Lemare, and Alfred Hollins. (Note: Hollins was one of two notable blind organists in Sydney, the other being S. Gordon Lavers. Hans Bertram was a notable blind organist in South Australia.)

Sometime around 1885, three of the committee, Rea, Younger, and Morley, were tasked by the Sydney Y.M.C.A. with specifying an organ for their hall.

=== As church organist ===
He was organist (Note: One church historian, the architect Harry C. Kent, remembered him as a "master of the fugue".) of the Congregational Church, Pitt Street, 1864 to 1869, and St John's Church of England, Darlinghurst 1870–1875, also serving as choirmaster.

A replacement for the old St Stephen's Church in Newtown was completed in 1874 and Rae was appointed organist, serving until 1901, when he retired.

He was first to play the University organ when that instrument was presented to the Senate by Sir Patrick Jennings. The instrument was notoriously difficult for organists unaware of its idiosyncrasies.

== Other interests ==
Rea was Vice-Warden of the Sydney College of Music, which was founded in 1894.

He was, with Hector Maclean, Examiner in Music at Sydney University.

== Compositions ==
Rea published several compositions for organ, and for the pianoforte:

- Grand March (sur un motif de Lefébure-Wély)

by Alexander Rea

- Grand Octave Waltz [for the pianoforte]
- Caprice [for the pianoforte] dedicated to Miss E. M. Woolley
- Chromatic Rondo [a study for the pianoforte]
- Consolation [melody for the pianoforte]
- Gathering Rosebuds [song] dedicated to Mrs L. B. Blackwell
- Sonatina No. 1 in C [for the pianoforte]
- The Chatterbox [rondo for the pianoforte]
- The Promenade [rondo for the pianoforte]

by Alexander Rea; words by Albert G. Dawes

- Beneath a Broad Elm Tree [song]
- Good Night, Good Night [song] as sung by Mr C. M. J. Edwards
- Reverie [song]

== Personal ==
Sometime around 1860, before leaving for Australia, Rea married Susan Ryall Lucas (died 2 July 1903). One son and three daughters survived childhood:

- Their eldest daughter Mary E. Rea (c. 1865 – 27 July 1929) married Charles Ernest Moore of Sydney on 10 November 1887.
- Their only son, Charles Leonard Rea (died 15 March 1920) married Linda Margaret Young, third daughter of George Edward Young, J.P., on 27 November 1895.

They had a home "Essington", Newtown (1865 or earlier – 1875), followed (1876–1877) by "Fair View House", Newtown, then "Butleigh", designed by Albert Bond, at Simmons Street, Enmore. Rae advertised the property for sale in 1880, but was living there when he died in 1909.
