= Thomas Sharp =

Thomas or Tom Sharp may refer to:

- Thomas C. Sharp (1818–1894), opponent of Joseph Smith Jr. and the Latter Day Saints
- Thomas Sharp (antiquary) (1770–1841), English antiquarian
- Thomas Sharp (organist) (1834–1912), Australian musician and teacher
- Thomas Sharp (priest) (1693–1758), English churchman (Archdeacon of Northumberland), biographer and theological writer
- Thomas Sharp (town planner) (1901–1978), English town planner and author
- Thomas Sharp (politician), member of the Delaware Senate
- Tom Sharp (actor), English actor
- Tom Sharp (footballer) (born 1957), Scottish football defender
- Tom Sharp (trader) (1838–1929), Confederate soldier and explorer, operated a trading post on the Taos Trail
- Tom Sharp (cricketer) (born 1977), English cricketer

== See also ==
- Thomas Sharpe (disambiguation)
