= Thomas Sharp (organist) =

Thomas Sharp MCO (c. 1834 – 2 January 1912), was an organist in Launceston and Sydney, Australia, remembered as a member of the committee which drew up the specifications for the Grand Organ in Sydney Town Hall. He was the only dissenter from its final decision. Three of his sons were professional organists.

== History ==
Sharp was a son of William Sharp (died 27 January 1875), who, in 1855 with his wife and family, emigrated from Kent to Launceston, Tasmania, where he developed a string of commercial buildings on Cameron Street, "Sharp's Buildings", the first shop of which was "Sharp's Music Warehouse".

In 1857 Sharp became organist at St John's Church, and was the driving force behind purchase of a new instrument by Charles Brindley of Sheffield, England, which arrived in the Alfred Hawley in 1862. When Rev. W. H. Browne retired he made a graceful speech acknowledging support he received from Sharp. In that year the Launceston Musical Union and the Cecilian Harmonic Society combined to form the Launceston Musical Society for which Sharp was elected president and Robert Sharpe (of All Saints' church) the organist. He took charge of the Mechanics' Institute organ (a very fine instrument but poorly maintained) after Sharpe left to preside at All Saints' Church, Southampton. He taught singing, conducted the choir, and was a teacher at the girls' Bible class. From 1874 his son William T. Sharp played the harmonium at the Sunday School and the organ at the Sunday afternoon services.

After the death of his father, Sharp and his family moved to Sydney, serving as organist and choirmaster at St James' Church, Sydney, and living at "St James's", 31 Lower Fort Street. He later moved to Darling Street, Balmain. In 1876 and 1877 he was organist and choirmaster at St Philip's Church, Sydney and St John's Church, Glebe. By June 1878 he had left St John's, but retained St Philip's and was also organist and choirmaster for St David's.

Sharp was in 1881, 1882 organist All Saints' Church, Woollahra. Their relationship was difficult, and Sharp finally resigned after being dismissed and then restored. He became organist and choirmaster of All Saints' Church, Woollahra.

In October 1884, when the Sydney City Council announced that tenders were about to be called for an organ for the about-to-be-built Centennial Hall, Sharp was highly critical of the process, complaining that organists, architects and other experts were not being consulted. The outcome was a ten-member panel which drew up a table of specifications, called for tenders, and oversaw installation.

Sharp was 1890–1891 choirmaster at St Andrew's, Summer Hill, also choirmaster and organist at St John's, Glebe, where his wife joined the choir.

In 1891 Sharp became organist to the Wesleyan church, Goldsmith Street, Goulburn. and settled in the town. He resigned in November 1896 and opened a bookshop and newsagency in Goulburn.

His last residence was Andreas Street, Petersham, where his wife died in 1902, following a long and painful illness. Sharp died in 1912 on the steamer Suevic, at sea between Adelaide and Melbourne, on a return trip from England with his sister.

== Teaching ==
Throughout his playing career, Sharp took private fee-paying students, at his home or the student's. He ran an "Academy of Music" from 1875 from his residence at 31 Lower Fort Street, then "Denham House", opposite the University on Newtown Road, in 1878 and 1879 From 1880 or earlier to 1883 Sharp was living at "Percy House" opposite Prince Alfred Park, 315 Cleveland Street, Redfern, where he conducted his Academy. His son Frederick transacted land deals from the same address. By 1885 the Academy had moved to Trafalgar Terrace, Petersham (Stanmore?), but Sharp had a residence "Rostella" in Hurst Street, Summer Hill, from 1884 to 1891 at least.

== As organ architect ==
Perhaps because of his wide experience with a variety of church organs, Sharp was called on several times to draw up a table of specifications for churches and other bodies. Examples are: Congregational Church, Bourke Street, opened 1888, one by Forster & Andrews for All Saints' Church, Woollahra and, famously, the Hill & Son Grand Organ in Sydney Town Hall, when his was the only dissenting voice from the final design. He considered it too expensive and too complex for most players.

== Family ==
Sharp married Louisa (died 7 July 1902). They had two daughters and five sons (two sons attended their grandfather's funeral February 1875), three of whom were organists. Louisa managed William Sharp's bookshop on Charles Street, Launceston, 1853–1862.

- William Thomas Sharp (c. 1861 – 16 October 1925) married Louise or Louisa Mason in 1885. Sometimes referred to as Thomas Sharp junior, he was organist of St Mathias' Church, Paddington in 1881, but dismissed in 1883 under circumstances which aroused popular sympathy. By 1884 he was organist of St John's Church, Ashfield. while his father was choirmaster. He was with St John's (the Baptist) for 12 years, much appreciated by the pastor and congregation. In 1895 he left for Napier, New Zealand as successor to Maughan Barnett.

In December 1889 he presided at the official opening of Sydney Town Hall's Centennial Hall. It was an American instrument, not the Grand Organ, which had not yet arrived.

- George Henry Sharp ( – 20 January 1945), living at Cleveland Street in 1883 later of 15 Monastery Street, Canterbury, England.
- Frederick Lacey Sharp (c. 1863 – 3 October 1953) was organist at St David's Church, Surry Hills in 1881, St Andrew's Church, Sydney in 1885, followed by the Ashfield Presbyterian Church, from 1889 to 1897. In 1899 he was business manager of the Summer Hill sanitarium, and became pastor of Seventh Day Adventist church. He married Louisa Jane Hulle (c. 1866 – 1 September 1900) on 5 November 1885. He married again, to Etta Marion.
- Eldest daughter, Elizabeth Caroline Sharp (c. 1866 – 9 June 1893) died at her parents' home in Goulburn.
- Annie Sharp (c. September 1868 – August 1883)
- Fourth son Charles Ernest Sharp (c. 1870 – 8 January 1946) was organist at Holy Trinity Church, Dulwich Hill, then Y.M.C.A. in 1894, St George's Paddington in December 1895, St Alban's, Epping in 1899 and St Anne's, Ashfield in 1904. He married Eda Phoebe "Ada" Dumble on 31 January 1894.

Robert Sharp (c. 1843 – 13 November 1896), harness maker, of 345 Cleveland Street, with factory in Regent Street, Redfern, was a brother. He married Olivia Jemima Weber on 6 September 1876.

Caroline Sharp (c. 1839 – 13 October 1924) was a sister. She left Launceston for Sydney on account of her health, and became a teacher of deaf and dumb at Goulburn, later Brisbane. She was an accomplished Braille writer and musician.

The celebrated Sydney organ builder Ronald William Sharp (8 August 1929 – 21 July 2021), was a son of William and Florence Sharp, or Sharpe and no family connection has been found.
