= Auguste Wiegand =

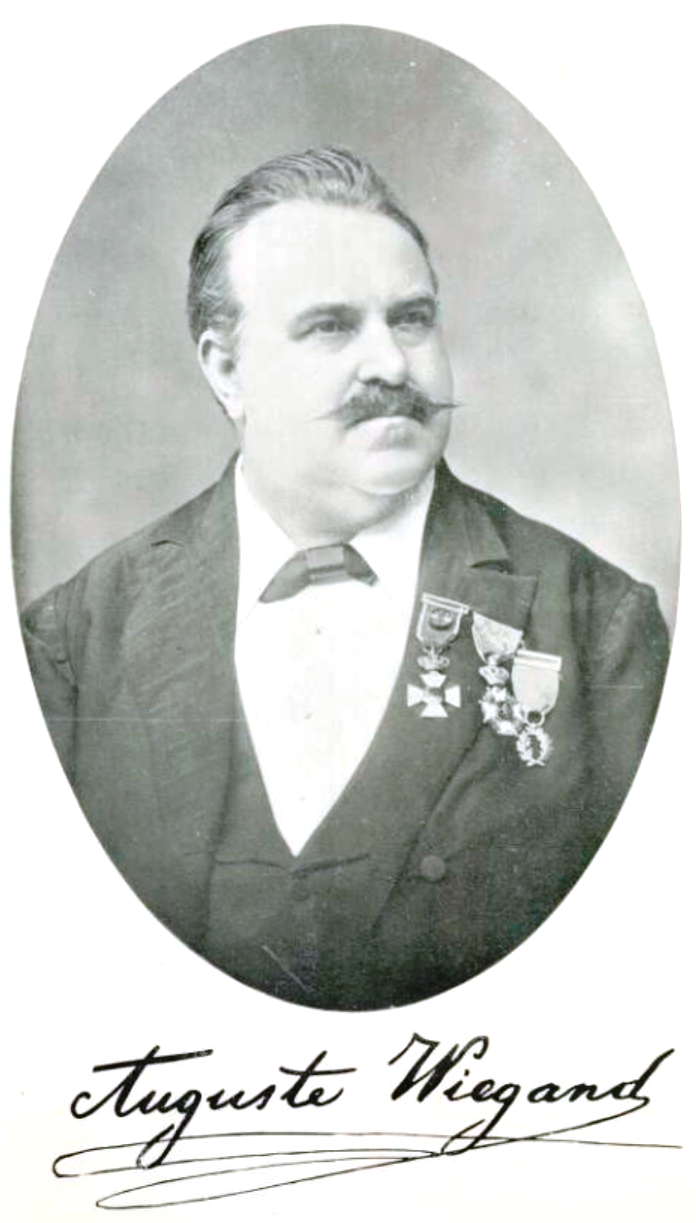
- Born: 16 October 1849; Liège, Belgium
- Died: 26 May 1904 (aged 54); Oswego, New York

M. Auguste Wiegand (16 October 1849 – 26 May 1904) was a Belgian organist, remembered as the first City Organist of Sydney, Australia.

== History ==
Wiegand was born in Liège, where his mother Josephine Wiegand died on 11 January 1897, aged around 83.

At the age of seven, he was organist for the Church of St Giles (elsewhere spelled St Gilles). From the age of ten he studied at the Royal Conservatoire where, amongst other prizes, he was awarded first prize for organ playing on 12 August 1867 and first prize for piano playing on 10 August 1868. He taught at the Conservatorium for six years, then won a bursary to study under Alphonse Mailly in Brussels. Between 1878 and 1890 he gave recitals throughout France, Germany, Holland, Belgium and Britain, many at the Antwerp International Exposition and in London.

=== Sydney ===
The Grand Organ in the Centennial Hall of Sydney Town Hall was installed for the City of Sydney in 1890 and opened by W. T. Best. A City Organist would not be appointed for a year, and in the meantime Alexander Rea was its most frequent performer, generally in connection with Sydney Choral Society concerts.

In 1891 a selection committee was commissioned to find Sydney's first City Organist, a £500 p.a. position. From around 100 applicants they chose Wiegand, of Middlesbrough, Yorkshire, with Frank Idle an option, should Wiegand be unavailable. Wiegand arrived by the RMS Orizaba on 23 June 1891, and, with Madame Wiegand, eventually settled in "Villa Mozart", on the Pyrmont Bridge Road.

Wiegand's first concert was held on 18 July 1891, and after formal introduction by Mayor Manning and Town Clerk Henry J. Daniels, Wiegand demonstrated the versatility of the instrument, playing Mendelssohn's "Sonata No. 1 in F minor", Jules Grison's "Melody in F", an "Étude de Concert" by Lacombe, Bach's "Grand Fugue in D minor", and "Fantasia upon Gounod's Faust", arranged for organ by Wiegand, as were many other selections.

... he is an executant of the highest order. His pedalling is magnificent. He has the monster organ completely under his control, and seems to delight in unfolding its varied resources. His judgment in the use of the many stops is very good; a strong leaning is evident towards the vox humana and the voix celeste ... Wiegand is essentially a concert organist, using the organ as an orchestra, and adapting overtures, operas, and other music composed for various instruments for performance on this, the king of instruments.

In March 1896 the Council approved Wiegand's request for five months' leave on full pay, for certain improvements to the organ carried out in his absence. In July, during a review of financial commitments, a move was made to rescind that approval. Prior to his leaving for Europe, Wiegand gave concerts at St Patrick's Church and St Benedict's and the Town Hall. Following his return to Sydney in mid-December by the steamer Ville de la Clotat, Wiegand repeated his opinion that the Town Hall organ was the "best in the world". His holiday had been spoiled by the sickness of his son, and by petty jealousies exhibited by organists at some of the cities he visited.

In 1900 Wiegand began a series of civic concerts on Wednesday and Saturday afternoons, in which pieces for organ alternated with solos by recognised artists, calculated to appeal to a wider public for whom purely instrumental music has little appeal. After a month or so, cracks developed in the relationship between organist and Council. On several occasions, Council imposed variations in the regular schedule of concert times and dates, resulting in a marked drop in attendance. Further, the selection of guest appearances was taken out of Wiegand's hands, resulting in additional costs for no improvement of takings. He set out his grievances in a letter to the Mayor and Council, The Mayor, Sir Matthew Harris MLA, supported by the aldermen, suspended the organist for insubordination, appointing one Sykes in his place.

His farewell appearance at the Town Hall on 7 July 1900 was introduced by his agent and friend E. Lewis Scott (Note: Perhaps Edwin Lewis Scott, best known for dramatizing The Silence of Dean Maitland, whose first production came to an abrupt end when its leading man killed his wife, then himself.) to an overcrowded hall of well-wishers. Gifts were exchanged and Wiegand played on the organ for the last time: his "Storm Idyll" followed by a sequence of tunes illustrating his coming trip to Paris, London and America.

His successor as Sydney City Organist was the Australian-born Arthur John Mason who occupied the stool from 1901 to 1907.

=== Last years ===
M. and Mme Wiegand left Australia for Europe by the Armand Behic on 9 July 1900. He played first at Albert Hall, Sheffield, on 8 September 1900, followed by numerous performances throughout England, Scotland and Ireland; his last performance in the British Isles was at St Nicholas Church, Sutton, London, on 18 December 1902.

Wiegand was appointed organist to the Church of St. Paul, Oswego, New York, where his first public performance was on 19 February 1903, followed by St Patrick's Day, 17 March and four more services at St Paul's Church. (Note: The studio attached to his residence "Mozart Cottage" at 115 East Fifth Street, Oswego, N.Y. was fitted with a three-manual and pedal pipe organ for student use and teaching.) He opened the new Hutchings-Votey organ at Sayles Memorial Hall, Brown University, Providence, Rhode Island, on 16 and 17 June, and his last performances were on that organ on 1 and 3 July, when he was suffering greatly but postponed hospitalization to fulfil that obligation. He had also agreed to perform on the immense new George Jardine & Son organ at the St. Louis Exhibition, but his death intervened: he died in hospital in Oswego, New York, after an operation for appendicitis.

== Recognition ==
- Wiegand was made an Officier de l'Academie des Beaux Arts by the French Republic in 1898.
- He was made a Chevalier de l'Ordre Royal de Mérite de Leopold by Belgium in 1900.

== Compositions ==
- "The Harp of St Cecilia"
- "The Storm"
- "Orizaba Gavotte" (Named after the steamer RMS Orizaba)

== Personal ==
Wiegand, a portly man who spoke little English, was married to Bertha Wiegand, and had several children. It is possible Marie Auguste Bertha Wiegand (born 5 May 1875 in Erfurt, Thuringen, Germany) was a daughter.

He underwent bankruptcy proceedings in 1899, largely attributed to medical expenses incurred for his only son, Gaston Marie Mozart Wiegand (c. May 1888 – 7 November 1898), who died after a series of operations in Brussels and a further operation in Sydney. His wife, Bertha Wiegand, also suffered poor health. They may have had several daughters; repayment of an advance from a daughter was a significant expense leading to his insolvency.

His annual income of £500 as City Organist was augmented by £90 as organist to St Patrick's Church, The Rocks. He had three private students, no further details found.
