= Sydney Town Hall Grand Organ =

Hill & Son pipe organ, 1890

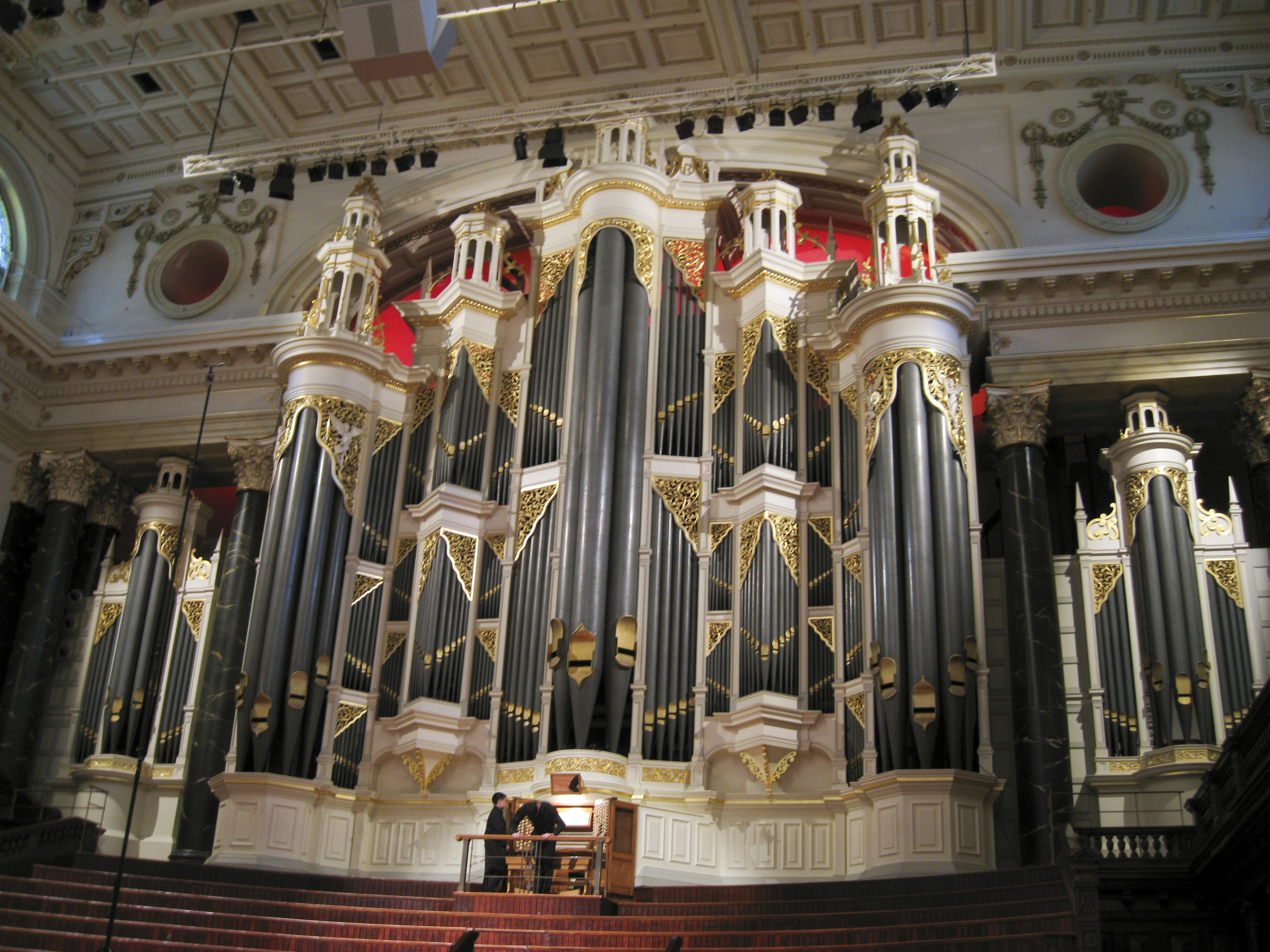
The Grand Organ

The Sydney Town Hall Grand Organ is the world's largest pipe organ that uses tubular pneumatic action, built by English firm William Hill & Son in 1890. It is located in the Centennial Hall of Sydney Town Hall in Sydney, New South Wales, Australia.

When it was installed in 1890, the Sydney Town Hall Grand Organ was the largest in the world, and it remained the largest concert organ built in the 19th century, boasting 5 manuals and 127 stops. It was described by Westminster Abbey's organist, Frederick Bridge, as "the finest organ ever built by an English organ builder". It remains the world's largest organ without any electric action components and is of international significance. Its Contra-Trombone is one of only two full-length 64' organ stops in the world. (Note: The other 64' stop is the Diaphone-Dulzian of the Boardwalk Hall Auditorium Organ (1932) in Atlantic City, New Jersey, United States.)

== History ==
When Sydney's City Council decided to commission the organ, they called on a small group of experts to formulate a process for achieving a transparent and defensible decision on supplier and installer. In this they received generous support and advice from the Melbourne City Council, who had been through a similar process. As a result, Sydney assembled a committee to compile a set of specifications for a Great Organ, which for power and versatility would be the world's largest and finest, call for tenders for both manufacture and installation, and select the successful tenders. The committee consisted of:

- Montague Younger, chairman. Younger was organist of St Andrew's Cathedral, Sydney and arguably Sydney's finest exponent.
- Alexander Rea, secretary. He had been closely involved in the preliminary negotiations.
- Albert Bond, architect with pipe organ experience
- William Davidson, organ builder
- Charles James Jackson, organ builder
- Harry C. Kent, Pitt Street architect
- Martin Louis Layton, organ builder (Note: M. L. Layton, formerly of Forster and Andrews was in partnership with A. K. Layton as Layton Brothers. They later took over C. J. Jackson's business.)
- Frederick Morley, organist of Bourke Street Wesleyan Church, (Note: Morley was later organist at St John's Anglican Church, Darlinghurst. His brother Felix was a distinguished organist in England.)
- William Henry Nash, organist for Christ Church St Laurence; designed the organ for St Andrew's Cathedral, Sydney.
- Thomas Sharp MCO, organist of All Saints' Church, Woollahra

Submissions were received from twelve companies, which were assessed on their perceived capacity to fill the contract, personal experience of the companies' products, technical considerations in the submissions, and finally, price. The choice narrowed down to two: Gray and Davison and William Hill and Son. The ultimate selection of Hill and Son may have been a foregone conclusion despite their higher price, as they had supplied and installed instruments for the Town Halls of Adelaide and Melbourne, and also St Andrew's Cathedral, Sydney. Several modifications suggested by the company were approved, and a new requirement added: that the organist's console should be situated at ground level, despite the additional expense and complexity.

Sharp dissented from the majority decision on the grounds that (1) the Hill organ was too large for the Centennial Hall, and (2) that it would be difficult and expensive to find an organist capable of matching its complexity. He was never confident of the committee throughout its deliberations.

Negotiations with Hill and Son were conducted by Alexander Rea, who, as leader of a group of organists, drew up the specifications. Belgium's Auguste Wiegand, who would become Sydney's first City Organist, later blamed the group for certain shortcomings in its design, but was contradicted by Hill, who praised the "Corporation of Sydney, ... they left all details in our hands." Rea supervised installation of the instrument and tested the mechanism before the famous organist W. T. Best "opened" the organ in August 1890. When Best returned to England, Rea gave a number of recitals at the Town Hall, and supervised access to the huge instrument until the appointment of Wiegand as City Organist in 1891.

=== 20th century ===
In 1973, the Sydney Council authorized a major restoration program to address the mechanical problems that the organ had begun to experience. Managing the program was Roger H Pogson, whose employees worked for almost 10 years to restore the organ, close to its original form.

Previous to this restoration, the organ had fallen into a state of disrepair; however, tuner of the organ in the 1960s, Ken Martin, a Noad employee, insists that, despite problems, the organ was always playable in some way. There were calls in the preceding decades to either rebuild the organ in a neo-classical style (this was the fashion at the time) or completely remove and replace it with a new instrument. The announcement that the Sydney Opera House being constructed would house a new, large, mechanical-action organ, greatly influenced the decision to restore the Hill and Son Organ.

Sydney Town Hall today holds free organ recitals throughout the year.

== Specification ==
The Town Hall organ features 127 stops, distributed over 5 manuals and the pedalboard, as follows:

GREAT		SWELL (enclosed)		CHOIR (enclosed)		SOLO (enclosed)		ECHO		PEDAL	
Contra Bourdon	32	Double Open Diapason	16	Contra Dulciana	16	Bourdon	16	Lieblich Gedackt	8	Double Open Diapason	32
Double Open Diapason	16	Bourdon	16	Open Diapason	8	Open Diapason	8	Viol d'Amour	8	Double Open Wood	32
Bourdon	16	Open Diapason	8	Hohl Flöte	8	Violin Diapason	8	Unda Maris II	8	Contra Bourdon	32
Open Diapason I	8	Hohl Flöte	8	Lieblich Gedackt	8	Doppel Flöte	8	Viol d'Amour	4	Open Diapason Metal	16
Open Diapason II	8	Viola da Gamba	8	Flauto Traverso	8	Flauto Traverso	8	Flageolet	2	Open Diapason Wood	16
Open Diapason III	8	Salicional	8	Gamba	8	Stopped Diapason	8	Glockenspiel	4 Rks	Bourdon	16
Open Diapason IV	8	Dulciana	8	Dulciana	8	Viola	8	Echo Dul. Cornet	4 Rks	Violone	16
Harmonic Flute	8	Vox Angelica	8	Octave	4	Octave	4	Basset Horn	8	Gamba	16
Viola	8	Octave	4	Violino	4	Harmonic Flute	4			Dulciana	16
Spitz Flöte	8	Rohr Flöte	4	Celestina	4	Flauto Traverso	4			Quint	12
Gamba	8	Harmonic Flute	4	Lieblich Flöte	4	Harmonic Piccolo	2			Octave	8
Hohl Flöte	8	Gemshorn	4	Twelfth	3	Contra Fagotto	16			Prestant	8
Rohr Flöte	8	Twelfth	3	Fifteenth	2	Harmonic Trumpet	8			Bass Flute	8
Quint	6	Fifteenth	2	Dulcet	2	Corno di Bassetto	8			Violoncello	8
Principal	4	Piccolo	1	Dulciana Mixture	3 Rks	Orchestral Oboe	8			Twelfth	6
Octave	4	Mixture	4 Rks	Bassoon	16	Cor Anglais	8			Fifteenth	4
Gemshorn	4	Furniture	5 Rks	Oboe	8	Octave Oboe	4			Mixture	4 Rks
Harmonic Flute	4	Trombone	16	Clarinet	8	Contra Tuba	16			Mixture	3 Rks
Twelfth	3	Bassoon	16	Vox Humana	8	Tuba	8			Mixture	2 Rks
Fifteenth	2	Trumpet	8	Octave Oboe	4	Tuba Clarion	4			Contra Trombone Wood (full length)	64
Mixture	3 Rks	Cornopean	8			Carillon Bells	2			Contra Posaune Metal	32
Cymbel	4 Rks	Horn	8							Posaune	16
Sharp Mixture	4 Rks	Oboe	8							Trombone	16
Furniture	5 Rks	Clarion	4							Bassoon	16
Contra Posaune	16									Trumpet	8
Posaune	8									Clarion	4
Trumpet	8										
Clarion	4										

== Gallery ==
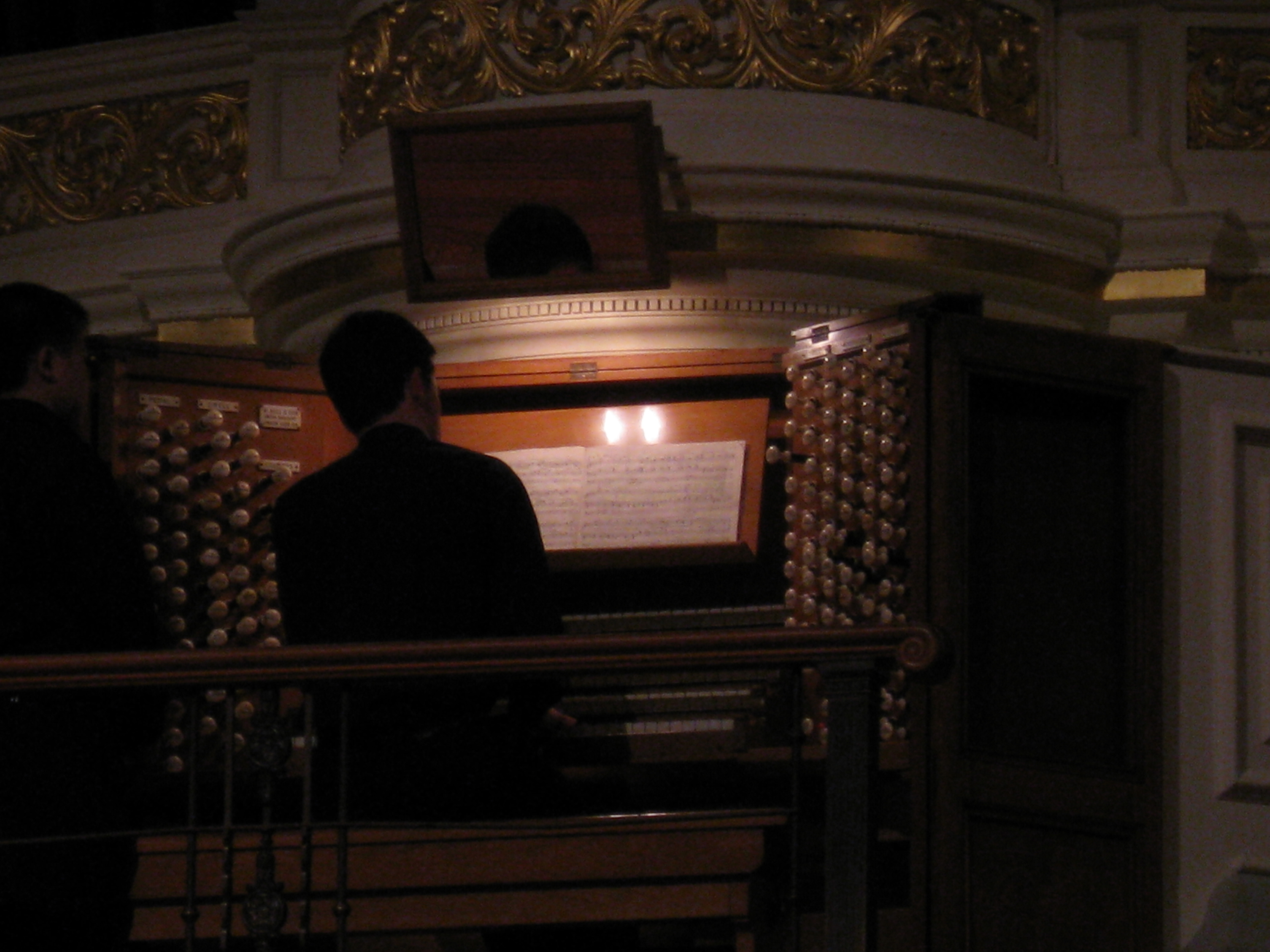
Rehearsing on the Organ

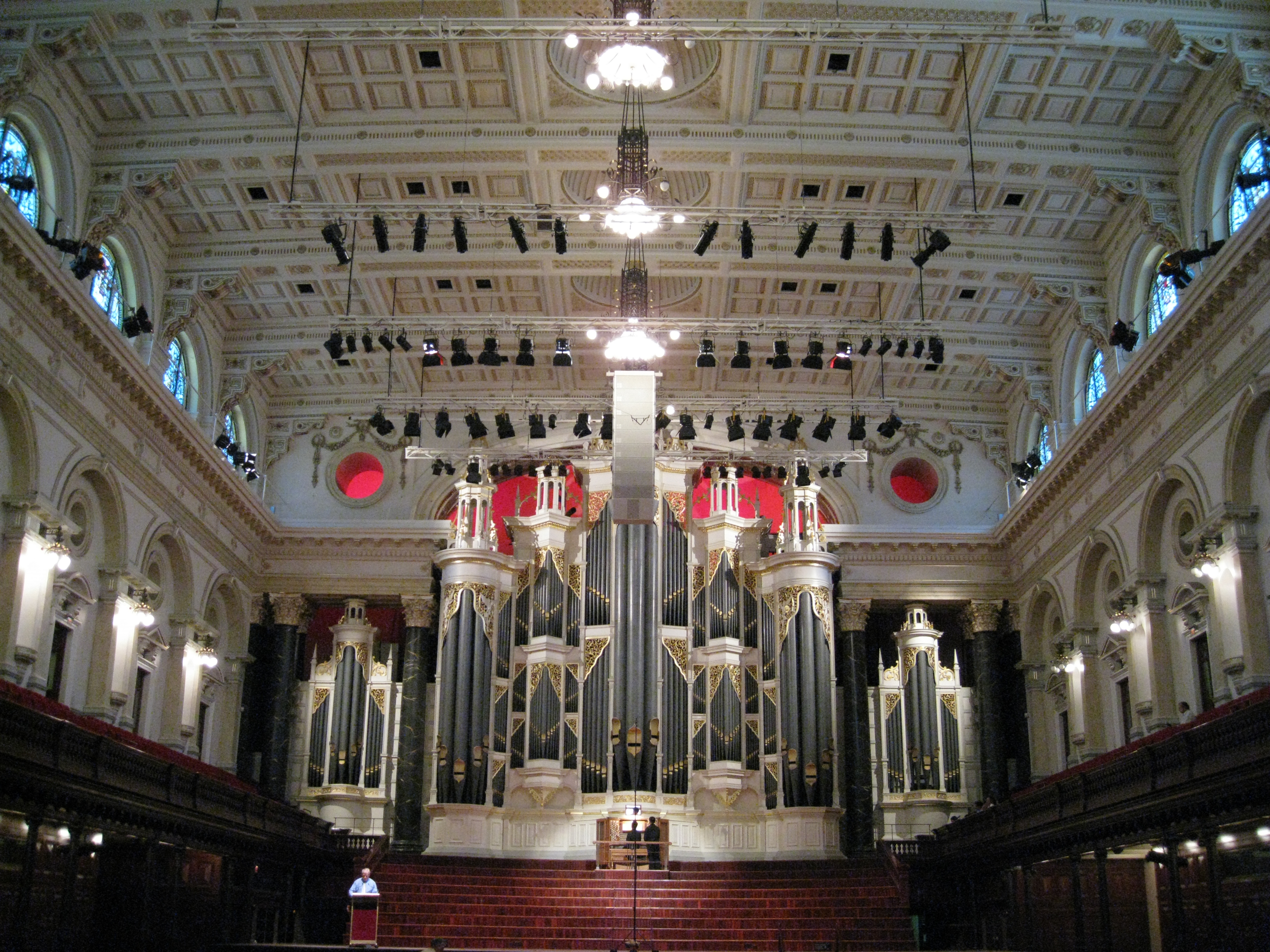
The Sydney Town Hall Centennial Hall interior
