= Thomas Sharpe =

Thomas Sharpe may refer to:

- Thomas Sharpe (politician) (1866–1929), Canadian politician, mayor of Winnipeg, 1904–1906
- Thomas Sharpe (RAF officer) (1887–?), British World War I flying ace
- Thomas G. Sharpe, Michigan politician
- Tom Sharpe (1928–2013), author
- Tom Sharpe (musician), American musician and composer

== See also ==
- Thomas Sharp (disambiguation)
