= St John's Church, Launceston =

St John's Church
- St John's Anglican Church
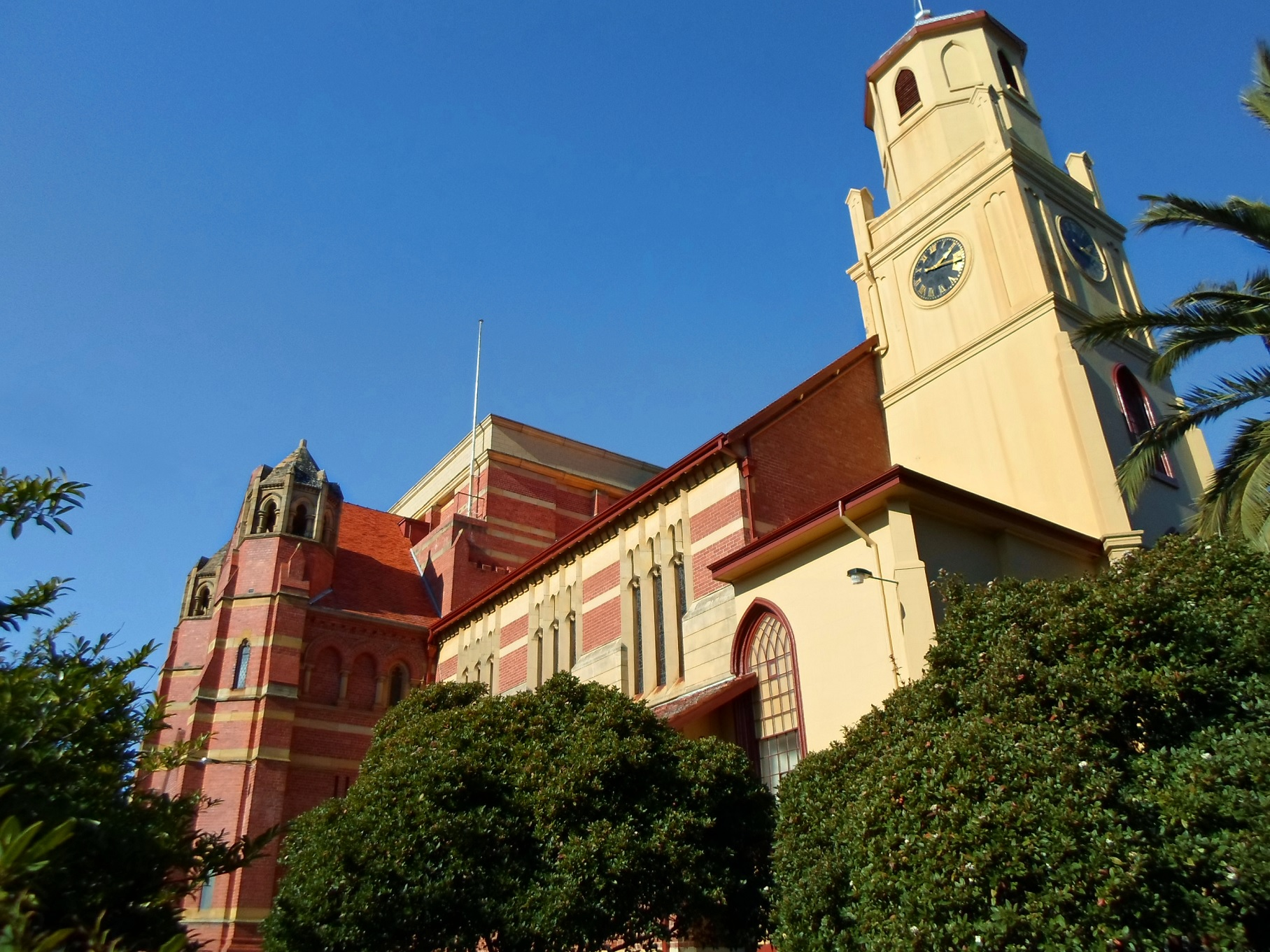
- St John's Church showing original front portion and later extensions

- Location within Tasmania
- 41.439781°S 147.141367°E
- Location: Launceston, Tasmania
- Country: Australia
- Denomination: Anglican
- Website: www.stjohnsac.net.au

History
- Status: Parish church
- Founded: 1825
- Founder: Lieutenant-Governor George Arthur
- Dedication: St John the Evangelist
- Consecrated: 1825

Architecture
- Architect(s): David Lambe (original church nave); John Lee Archer (clock tower); Alexander North (main church body)
- Architectural type: Church
- Style: Colonial Gothic
- Years built: 1825 (original church completed); 1830 (clock tower added); 1911 (transept and altar completed); 1938 (new nave completed)
- Groundbreaking: 1824

Specifications
- Materials: Sandstone, brick, stucco, bluestone

Administration
- Diocese: Diocese of Tasmania

Clergy
- Rector: Rev James Hornby

St Johns Church, is an Anglican church in Launceston, Tasmania and the oldest church in the city, construction having started in 1824. Though the church is one of the oldest surviving churches in Australia, it has received numerous extensions and modifications with only the tower and first window pair of the nave being original. St John's Church is located on the corner of St John Street and Elizabeth Street and is one of five churches facing onto Prince's Square.

The church's bell was cast by Whitechapel Bell Foundry in London.

Thomas Sharp was organist from 1857 to 1875.

== See also ==
- Anglican Church of Australia
