= Montague Thomas Robson Younger =

Australian church music teacher and organist

Montague Thomas Robson Younger (25 June 1836 – 26 December 1899) was an Australian church musician, music teacher and organist. Younger was born in Sydney, New South Wales and died in Ashfield, Sydney, New South Wales. He was the first organist of St Andrew's Cathedral, Sydney and has been described as "the first native of Sydney to reach eminence as an organist".

Montague Younger was born in Sydney on 25 June 1836, the third son of Charles Younger, an ironmonger, and his wife Harriett, née Mills. Charles Younger was organist at St Thomas's Church, North Sydney and a founding member of the Sydney Philharmonic Society in 1854. Montague attended a private school at Surry Hills conducted by Rev. Thomas L. Dodd. and took music lessons from Stephen Marsh and later from C. S. Packer. At the age of 12 years he succeeded his father as organist at St Thomas's, and also served as organist at St Peter's Church, Cook's River.

Younger became a partner in his father's firm, Younger and Son, ironmongers, until 1865. On 26 October 1865 he was married to Anna Maria Reilly at St Peter's Church. In 1865 the couple moved to Ipswich, Queensland, where Younger was appointed organist of St Paul's Church and director of the local Philharmonic Society. In 1868 Younger became the first organist of the newly opened St Andrew's Cathedral, in which post he served for over thirty years. Younger became vice-warden of the Sydney College of Music and was chairman of the committee for the specifications of the organ in the Sydney Town Hall. He was an influential music teacher; one of his pupils, Arthur Mason being appointed City of Sydney Organist. Younger was a judge at the Sydney International Exhibition in 1879–80.

Younger died of broncho-pneumonia at Ashfield on 26 December 1899. He was buried in the cemetery of St Thomas's, North Sydney and a memorial plaque was erected in St Andrew's Cathedral.

== Bibliography ==
- A. Wiegand, The Largest Organ in the World and the Musical Artists of Sydney (Syd, 1892), Australasian, 6 Jan 1900; Sydney Morning Herald, 17 Dec 1932.
- Peter Hughes, Montague Younger : first organist of St Andrew's Cathedral Sydney : 12 October 1868 – 26 December 1899, the Organ Society of Sydney in "The Sydney Organ Journal", (Dec. 1999), ISBN 0-646-38312-4
- E. J. Lea-Scarlett, Younger, Montague Thomas Robson (1836–1899), Australian Dictionary of Biography, Volume 6, Melbourne University Press, 1976, pp 458–459.
