= William Thomas Best =

English organist and composer

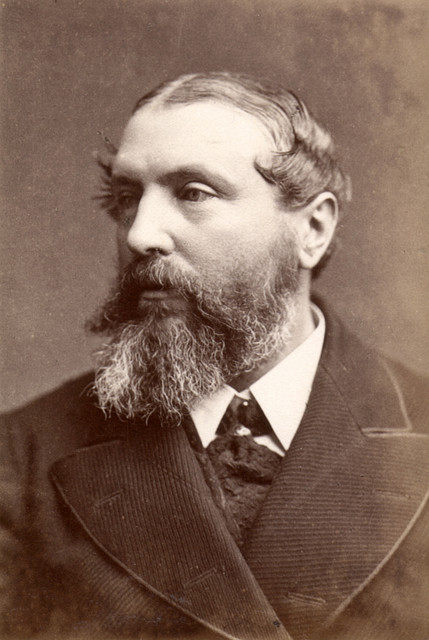
- Born: 13 August 1826; Carlisle, Cumberland, England
- Died: 10 May 1897 (aged 70); Broadgreen, Liverpool
- Occupation: Organist

William Thomas Best (13 August 1826 – 10 May 1897) was an English organist and composer.

== Life ==
He was born at Carlisle, Cumberland, the son of William Best, a local solicitor. In childhood, he displayed talent for music, and had some lessons from Young, organist of Carlisle Cathedral. As his father intended he should become a civil engineer, he was sent to Liverpool in 1840 for study. At the age of fourteen, he became organist of the baptist chapel in Pembroke Road, which had an organ with a C_{2}–C_{3} pedal keyboard, then very rare in England. He practised four hours daily on this organ, and also worked regularly at pianoforte technique.

In the main, Best was self-taught; the organists of that period were nearly all accustomed only to the incomplete F or G organs, upon which the works of Bach and Mendelssohn could not be played, and he applied himself to Bach's music in particular. He had some lessons in counterpoint from John Richardson, organist of St. Nicholas's Roman Catholic church; and also, it appears, from a blind organist.

At about the age of twenty, he decided to become a professional musician. In 1847 he was appointed organist at the Church for the Blind in Liverpool, and in 1849 also to the Liverpool Philharmonic Society under whose auspices he made his first appearance as a concert organist. He paid a visit to Spain in the winter of 1852–3, and then spent some time in London, acting as organist at the Royal Panopticon, which possessed a four-manual organ, the largest in London. He was dismissed for refusing to play Mendelssohn's Wedding March while the audience was exiting the auditorium. He was also for a few months organist at St. Martin's-in-the-Fields and at Lincoln's Inn Chapel.

In 1855, on the completion of the great organ in St George's Hall, Liverpool, he was appointed corporation organist at a salary of £300 yearly, and conducted a grand concert as the climax of the festivities at the opening of the hall. He remained organist of St. George's Hall nearly forty years, and gave three recitals weekly. His performances rapidly became famous throughout England; ill health forced him to retire in 1894. For some years he was much occupied in Liverpool as a teacher, and also became church organist at Wallasey in 1860. After three years he left this post and acted for some time as organist at Trinity Church, Walton Breck; and, finally, he was organist at St Mary's Church, West Derby, Liverpool. In 1859, he occasionally played organ solos at the Monday Popular Concerts in St James's Hall, London.

Although complete pedal-keyboards had now become general, no performer in England equalled Best, and he was very frequently invited to inaugurate newly built organs all over the country. At the Handel festival in June 1871, Best played an organ concerto with orchestral accompaniment, probably the first occasion within living memory when any of these works was played as was intended by the composer; and the experiment was so successful that Best was engaged at subsequent festivals for the same purpose. He also inaugurated the huge organ in the Royal Albert Hall on 18 July 1871.

In 1880, he was offered a knighthood; but he preferred to take a civil list pension of £100. He also refused to be made doctor of music. Continual work as a performer, composer, editor, and teacher, brought on an illness which necessitated a lengthened rest in 1881–2; he visited Italy, and during his convalescence gave a grand recital in Rome, at the request of Liszt. On his return to England he discontinued teaching, and resigned his appointment at West Derby church. As the greatest living British organist he was invited to Australia to inaugurate the Sydney Town Hall Grand Organ. He accepted the invitation, and before leaving England exhibited the powers of this unrivalled instrument at the builder's factory in London, in the presence of a number of Australians. He gave a farewell recital in St George's Hall on 8 February 1890, and gave the inaugural performance at Sydney on 9 August. In July 1891 Auguste Wiegand was installed as City Organist. Best suffered from gout, and expected the journey would improve his health; but it had a contrary effect, and after his return his public appearances were less frequent. He retired in February 1894 with a pension of £240. After much suffering from dropsy, he died at his residence, Seymour Road, Broad Green, Liverpool, on 10 May 1897, and was buried on 13 May in Childwall parish graveyard.

== Works ==
He published some pianoforte and vocal pieces, which had little success; his organ compositions are much more important, and are constantly played at recitals in churches and concert-rooms. His ecclesiastical music, especially his Benedicite (1864) with a free organ part, and his Service in F, may often be heard in cathedrals and parish churches. He was still better known as an editor, and was remarkably painstaking and conscientious (Musical Herald, October 1900, p. 293). He was deeply studied in Handel's music, and edited his concertos and large selections of airs from the operas and oratorios. A Handel-Album, which extended to twenty volumes, was originally intended to consist of selections from the lesser-known instrumental works arranged for the organ; it was afterwards taken from more varied sources—the operas especially. He arranged for organ some hundreds of excerpts from other great masters' vocal and instrumental works. Another of Best's editions was Cecilia (1883), a collection, in fifty-six parts, of original organ pieces by modern composers of various countries; it included his own Sonata in D minor, a Christmas Pastorale, a set of Twelve Preludes on English Psalm-tunes, a Concert-fugue, a Scherzo, and several other pieces of his own composition. The Art of Organ-Playing (1869) is a very complete and thoroughly practical instruction book, ranging from the rudiments of execution to the highest proficiency. In 1885, at the bicentenary of Bach's birth, Best began an edition of Bach's organ works, which he almost completed before he died.

== Assessment ==
As a performer, Best was widely regarded as preeminent among contemporary British organists. He executed the full range of organ repertoire with exceptional precision and, through his articulate playing, suggested accents and nuances not typically achievable on the instrument. His repertoire was believed to encompass approximately five thousand works, and he was notably effective in using the organ to emulate orchestral textures. In addition, he was recognized as a highly accomplished pianist.

Best was somewhat eccentric and in the main a recluse. He associated little with other musicians. He would not join the Royal College of Organists, and refused to play on any organ whose pedal-keyboard had been constructed on the plan recommended by that college. For many years he refused to let any other organist play on his own organ. He kept the tuner in attendance at his recitals in St. George's Hall, and would leave his seat in the middle of a performance to expostulate with him; on one occasion he informed the audience that the tuner received a princely salary and neglected his work. He would indulge his fancies to the full in brilliant extemporisations when a church organist, but his recitals in St. George's Hall were invariably restrained and classical.

== Recordings ==
- "Christmas Fantasy on Old English Carols" in Adeste Fideles – Organ Music for Christmas Delphian – DCD34077

Cultural offices
Preceded by Thomas Forbes Gerrard Walmisley	Organist of St Martin-in-the-Fields; 1854–1855	Succeeded by Henry Bevington
