= Sydney Town Hall =

City hall in Sydney, New South Wales, Australia

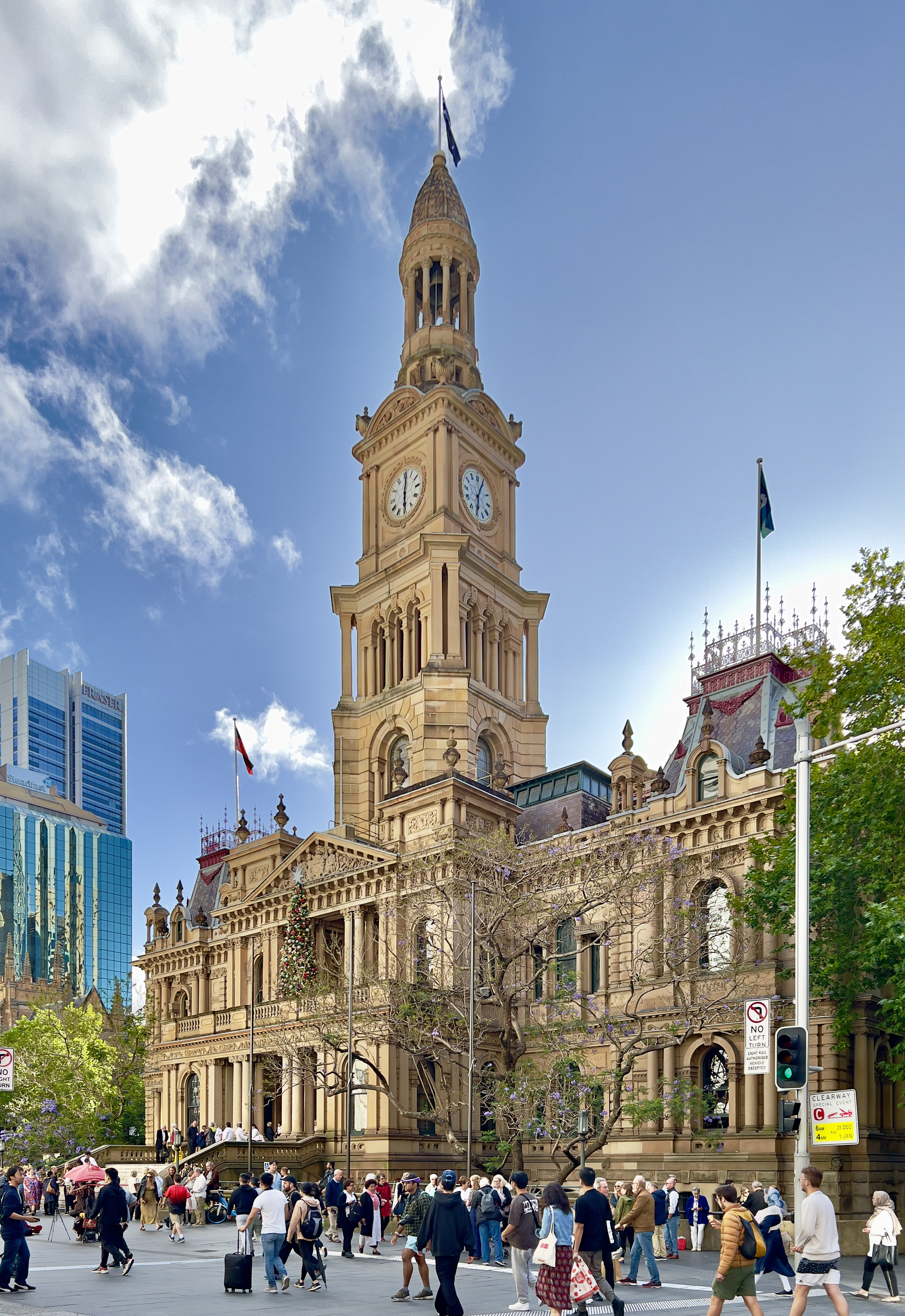

- Location within Sydney
- Alternative names: Town Hall, Centennial Hall, Main Hall, Peace Hall, Great Hall, Old Burial Ground

General information
- Status: Completed
- Type: Town hall
- Architectural style: Victorian Second Empire; French Second Empire
- Location: 483 George Street, Sydney CBD, New South Wales, Australia
- Coordinates: 33°52′24″S 151°12′23″E
- Construction started: 1869; 157 years ago
- Opened: 1878; 148 years ago (1st stage); 1890; 136 years ago (2nd stage)
- Renovated: 1991–1992
- Renovation cost: A$15.5 million
- Owner: City of Sydney

Technical details
- Material: Sydney sandstone exterior walls; Brick & plaster internal walls; Timber, concrete & tile floors; Timber roof trusses; Steel & wrought iron pitched roof; Steel domed pavilions; Cedar timber windows & doors; Stained & leadlight glass windows
- Floor count: 2
- Lifts/elevators: 1

Design and construction
- Architect: John H. Wilson
- Other designers: Edward Bell; Albert Bond; Thomas Sapsford; John Hennessy; George McRae
- Main contractor: Kelly and McLeod; Smith and Bennett; McLeod and Noble; J. Stewart and Co.
- Known for: Sydney Town Hall Grand Organ; Rich decoration, craftsmanship, Victorian interiors, intricate fenestration and complex roof profiles

Other information
- Seating capacity: 2,535 (Centennial Hall)

Website
- www.sydneytownhall.com.au

New South Wales Heritage Register
- Official name: Sydney Town Hall; Town Hall; Centennial Hall; Main Hall; Peace Hall; Great Hall; Old Burial Ground
- Type: State heritage (built)
- Criteria: a., b., c., d., e., f., g.
- Designated: 5 March 2010
- Part of: Town Hall / QVB Group
- Reference no.: 1452
- Type: Council Chambers
- Category: Government and Administration

The Sydney Town Hall is a late 19th-century heritage-listed town hall building in the city of Sydney, the capital city of New South Wales, Australia, housing the chambers of the Lord Mayor of Sydney, council offices, and venues for meetings and functions. It is located at 483 George Street, in the Sydney central business district opposite the Queen Victoria Building and alongside St Andrew's Cathedral. Sited above the Town Hall station and between the city shopping and entertainment precincts, the steps of the Town Hall are a popular meeting place.

It was designed by John H. Wilson, Edward Bell, Albert Bond, Thomas Sapsford, John Hennessy and George McRae and built from 1869 to 1889 by Kelly and McLeod, Smith and Bennett, McLeod and Noble, J. Stewart and Co. It is also known as Town Hall, Centennial Hall, Main Hall, Peace Hall, Great Hall and Old Burial Ground. The Town Hall is listed on the (now defunct) Register of the National Estate and the New South Wales State Heritage Register and is part of the heritage-listed Town Hall precinct which includes the Queen Victoria Building, St Andrew's Cathedral, the Gresham Hotel and the former Bank of New South Wales. In latter years, it has been discovered that Town Hall lies on top of part of a cemetery complex. Renovations were undertaken in 2008–2009 primarily to upgrade the mechanical, hydraulic, electrical and communication services within the building. The renovations, completed by Kell & Rigby, included removing 6,000 cubic metres (210,000 cu ft) of sandstone from underneath the building.

The Town Hall Square project is proposed opposite the building.

== History ==
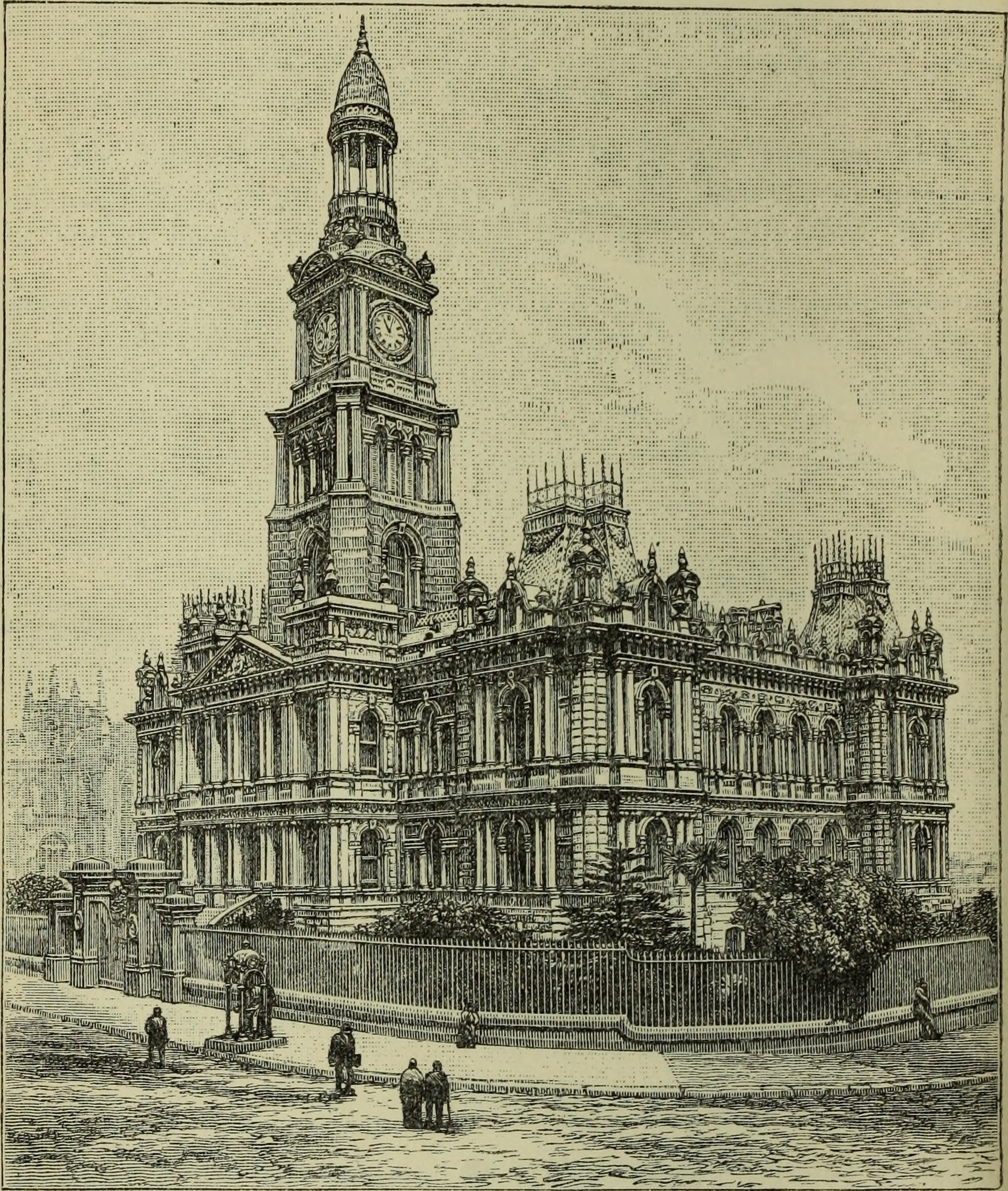
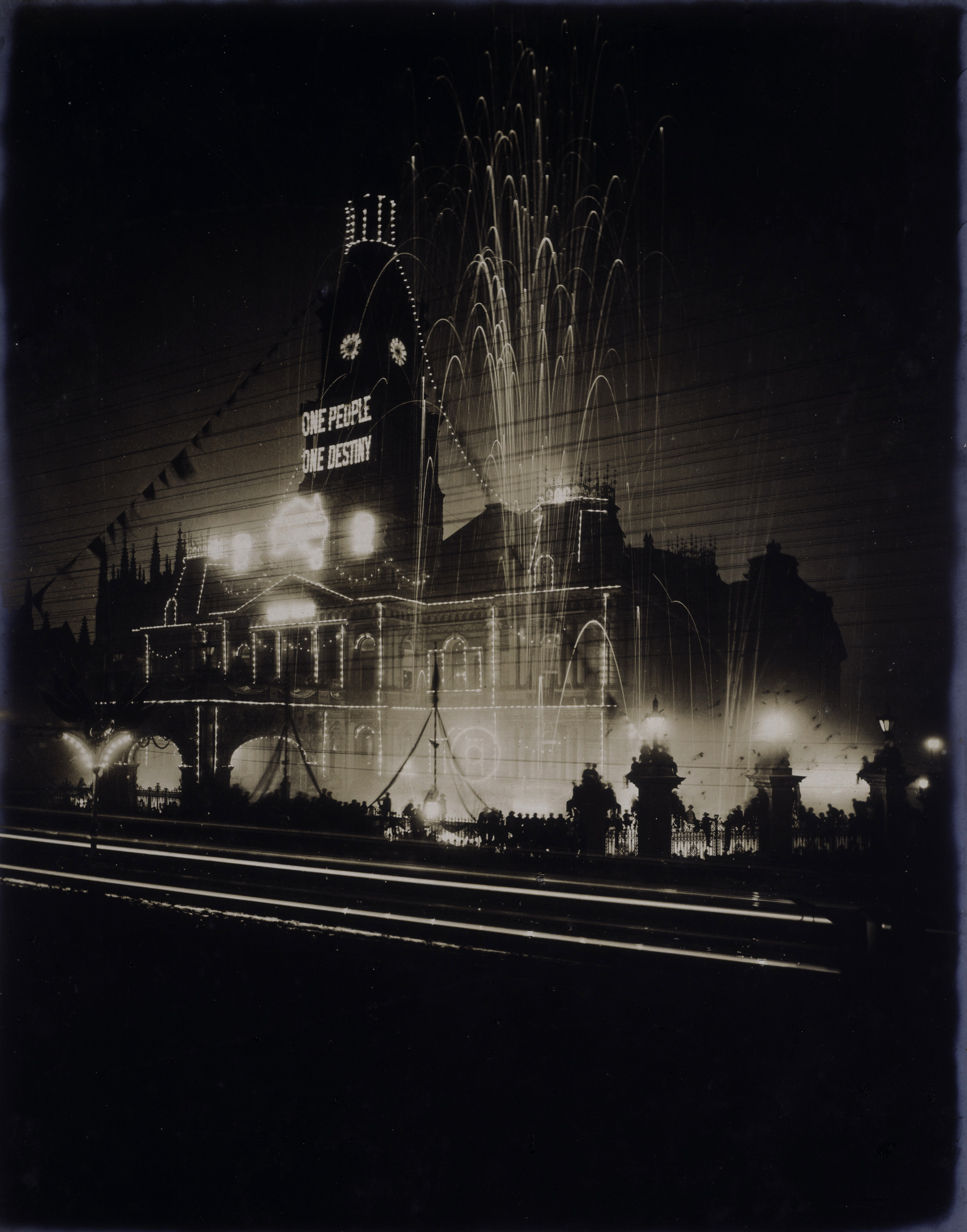
A render of the Sydney Town Hall from the 1890s (left) and during the Inauguration of the Australian Commonwealth in 1901. The illuminated sign reads "One people, one destiny" (right).

The Sydney Town Hall is built within the former Old Sydney Burial Ground. The cemetery was Sydney's first permanent cemetery and it is estimated that at least 2,000 burials were made in the Old Sydney Burial Ground between 1792 and 1820. The cemetery boundary originally extended into George Street and up to the southern side of Druitt Street. The cemetery was Sydney's first permanent cemetery, burials previously being reported in land adjacent to the Military Barracks and in the Rocks. The cemetery was set out in September 1792 by Governor Phillip and the Reverend Richard Johnson on land that had belonged to Marine Captain Shea (buried there in 1789) and the first interments presumably took place from this time. More land was added on the northern and western sides of the cemetery in 1812. The cemetery was closed in 1820 when the Sandhills or Brickfield cemetery (now Central railway station) was opened.

The majority of the people who died in Sydney would have been buried there, convict and prominent citizen alike, unless they were buried on their own land. Certain parts of the cemetery were set aside for particular people or groups (i.e. New South Wales Corps' area was near the Druitt and George Street Corner).

After it closed in 1820 the state of the cemetery deteriorated so that in 1845 evidence was given to a committee inquiring into its future that most of the graves were no longer marked and that it would be impossible to find them without clearing the land down to coffins. Notice was given in The Sydney Morning Herald that remains of the interred "so far as they can by reasonable search be discovered" would be reburied at Rookwood Cemetery. Since that time, works in the vicinity of the Town Hall regularly expose remains of graves.

The City Corporation was formed in 1842 meeting in various temporary offices. They lobbied the NSW Government for a suitable site for many years and were eventually granted the Old Burial Ground, in the heart of the commercial district. The site was used as Sydney's official burial ground from 1792 to 1820. Graves ranged from paupers unmarked burials to elaborate tombs and vaults. Vandalism of the site is described in the 1840s to 1860s and some tombstones were used in footpaths. When the site was developed for the Town Hall remains that were disturbed were reinterred in a memorial in Rookwood Cemetery. Where graves were not disturbed they were left untouched.

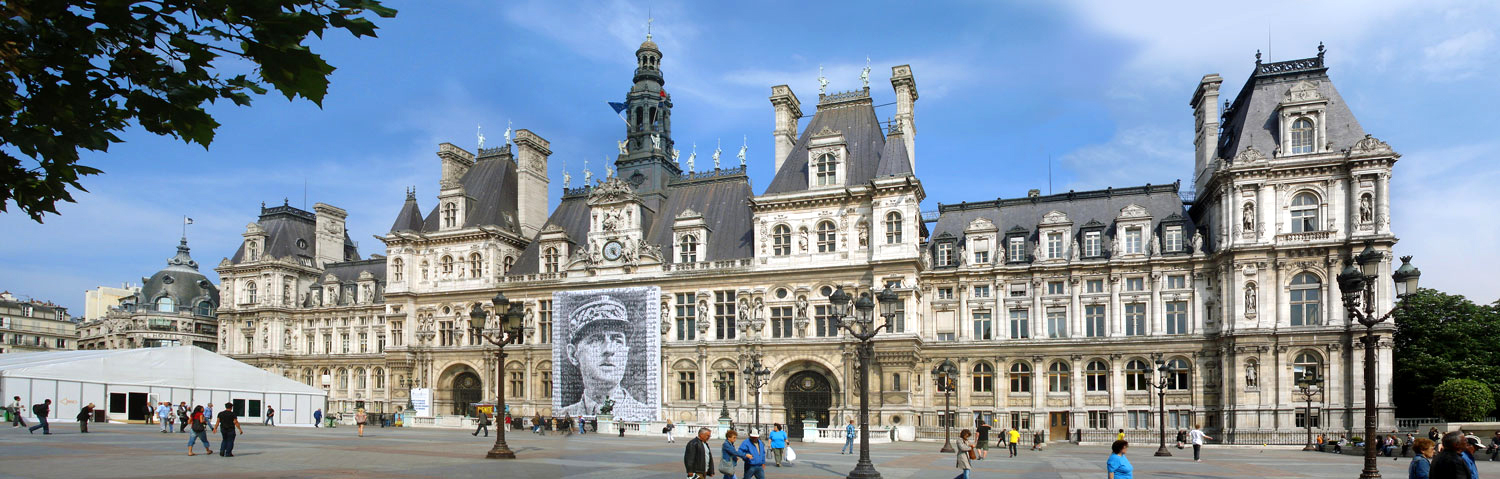
The Sydney Town Hall was inspired by the Hôtel de Ville in Paris, France, making similar use of its mansard roofs and Victorian Second Empire detail.

The foundation stone was laid in January 1868 by Prince Alfred, the Duke of Edinburgh. Construction commenced in 1869, and it was designed to be a symbol of the wealth and status of the city. The building was constructed in two stages, Stage I: 1868 - 1878 and Stage II: the Main Hall, 1885–1890. The Town Hall design was the result of a competition, won by J. H. Willson. The Second Empire style design (including four eastern pavilions, clock tower, vestibule, reception room and Council Chamber) was modified by the City Engineer to reduce the cost. Following Willson's death Stage I was completed by successive City Architects. The design and construction were associated with intense political and personal battles. In 1875 council occupied the incomplete building in temporary offices on the lower floor. Discussion continued about Stage II, including a report by McBeath in 1878 with costs for the foundations. These proceeded in 1880 but were faulty and work halted.

The building was extended from 1884-86 with construction of Centennial Hall to the west. In 1881 Stage II was redesigned by Thomas Sapsford, City Architect, assisted by John Hennessy, and after Sapsford's death was completed under the supervision of George McRae, City Architect. The new design featured a wider hall and curved corridors.

The new foundation stone was laid by Lady Mayoress Lizzie Harris in 1883 and the contract for the superstructure was let in 1885. John Harris was mayor five times from 1875 to 1900. The completion was delayed waiting for roof girders from England and was finally opened in 1889. Electric lighting was used from the start produced by an engine on site. The practice of inscribing names in the building continued in the form of plaques, tablets and bronze medallions often unveiled by important public figures.

From the late 1880s through the 1890s, Town Hall was significantly the site where a number of important meetings on the issue of Federation took place. Specifically, it was the venue for the formation and official launch of the Australasian Federation League, the principal pro-federation organisation in NSW, in June and July 1893 respectively. The League also held its annual general and other meetings in the building and, on the eve of the second- and successful- federation referendum in June 1899, organised a massive public demonstration at the Hall in support of federation. The opponents of federation also used the Hall for important gatherings, such as the major public meeting organised by the Anti-Convention Bill League in April 1898 as the first major public exposition of its views.

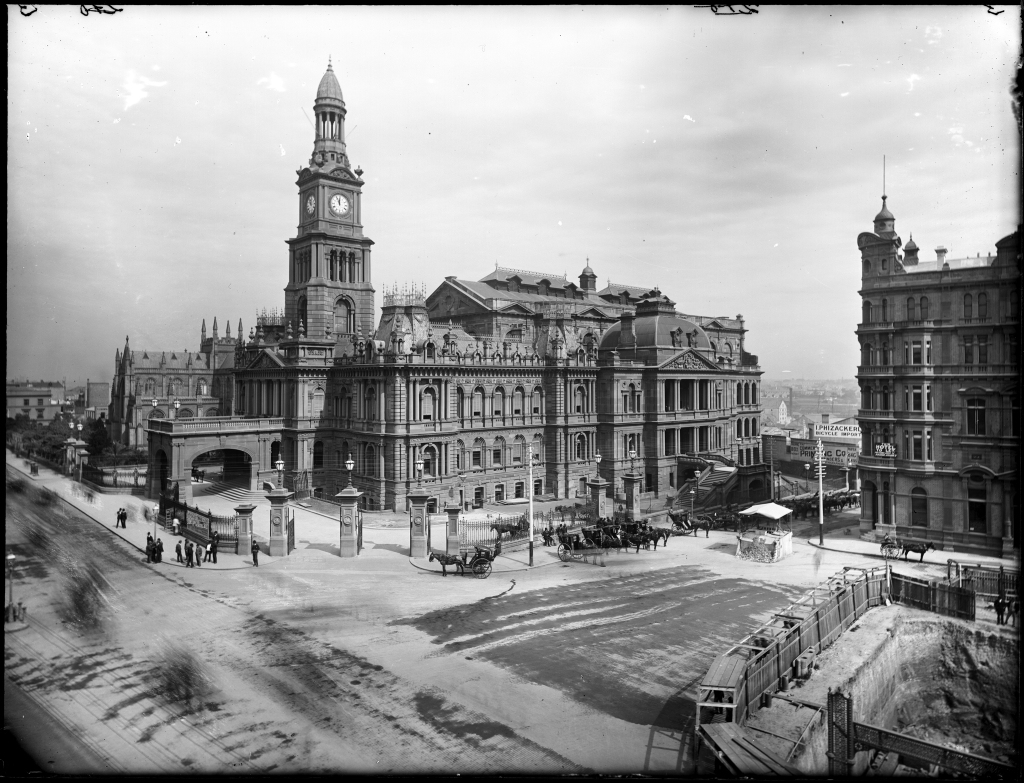
Sydney Town Hall c. 1900, facing south-west, with St. Andrew's Cathedral in the background (left)

Redecoration and various additions and alterations took place in the late 19th and early 20th century. In 1889 upgrading works included facing the stone treads of the north and south stairs with marble and redecoration of the front entrance and first floor chambers. Painting of the Main Hall was extensively debated and in 1903 proposals for colours were rejected and a scheme of "cream tones, flatted" was chosen.

In 1890 the Mayor's private rooms, on the first floor in the north of the second stage, were grandly furnished by the Mayor. It was redecorated in 1906 for the Lady Mayoress with new openings between rooms in the Art Nouveau style. The rooms house some of Town Hall's most precious items, including the "Vase de Remini".

During World War I, the Town Hall displayed banners saying "Welcome" and "God Speed" and there was a controversy over hiring the hall to various groups and many tried to obtain bookings at charity rate. The Artists Ball in 1924 "got out of hand" and there was heightened debate over use.

The Labor Party assumed control of Council in the mid 1920s but were sacked by the NSW Government who installed Commissioners in 1927. They answered criticism of the difficulties of using the halls with a proposal to revamp the place to enhance its letting value. The Labour Daily criticised the sacrifice of staff rooms. In 1929 blasting for the underground railway destabilised the port cochere to the east entrance and the Labour Daily called for its removal saying it was an afterthought for the aristocracy. In 1934 the current, more democratic, George Street stair and portico entrance commenced construction and the project incorporated works modernising Lower Town Hall. The additional columns in the Lower Town Hall may have been installed at this time.

During World War II Town Hall took an active role in maintaining civilian morale and safety. Areas were set aside for administration of National Emergency Services. The Lower Hall was altered to accommodate stretcher parties and there was an emergency battery. By 1948 letting of Town Hall to the Communist Party and similar organisation was banned.

Up till the opening of the Sydney Opera House, Town Hall was the major venue for reception of guests to Sydney, including Royalty. Such visits were sometimes preceded by renovations to the building and accompanied by decorations with drapes and illuminations. In the 1950s and 1960s the hall was also the venue for naturalisation ceremonies and for mass vaccinations and events promoting public health. In the 1970s the front steps became the saluting base for Vietnam marches and for demonstrations and subsequently witnessed demonstrations about the law and the Green Bans campaign.

Sundry additions and alterations have taken place throughout the building in the late 20th century, including addition of a goods lift servicing Centennial Hall and Lower Town Hall in 1978.

In 1989 and 1990 the centenary of the main hall, and Council's sesquicentenary were celebrated and resulted in the restoration of the main public spaces and the east facade. Substantial restoration and redecoration works took place in the early 1990s. In 2000, Olympic and Paralympic ceremonial events took place at Sydney Town Hall. A major upgrade of essential services was undertaken in 2009-10.

On 5 November 2014, a national memorial service was held in honour of former Australian prime minister Gough Whitlam, who died at the age of 98. c.6,000 people attended the memorial, hailing him as a visionary and political giant.

== Description ==
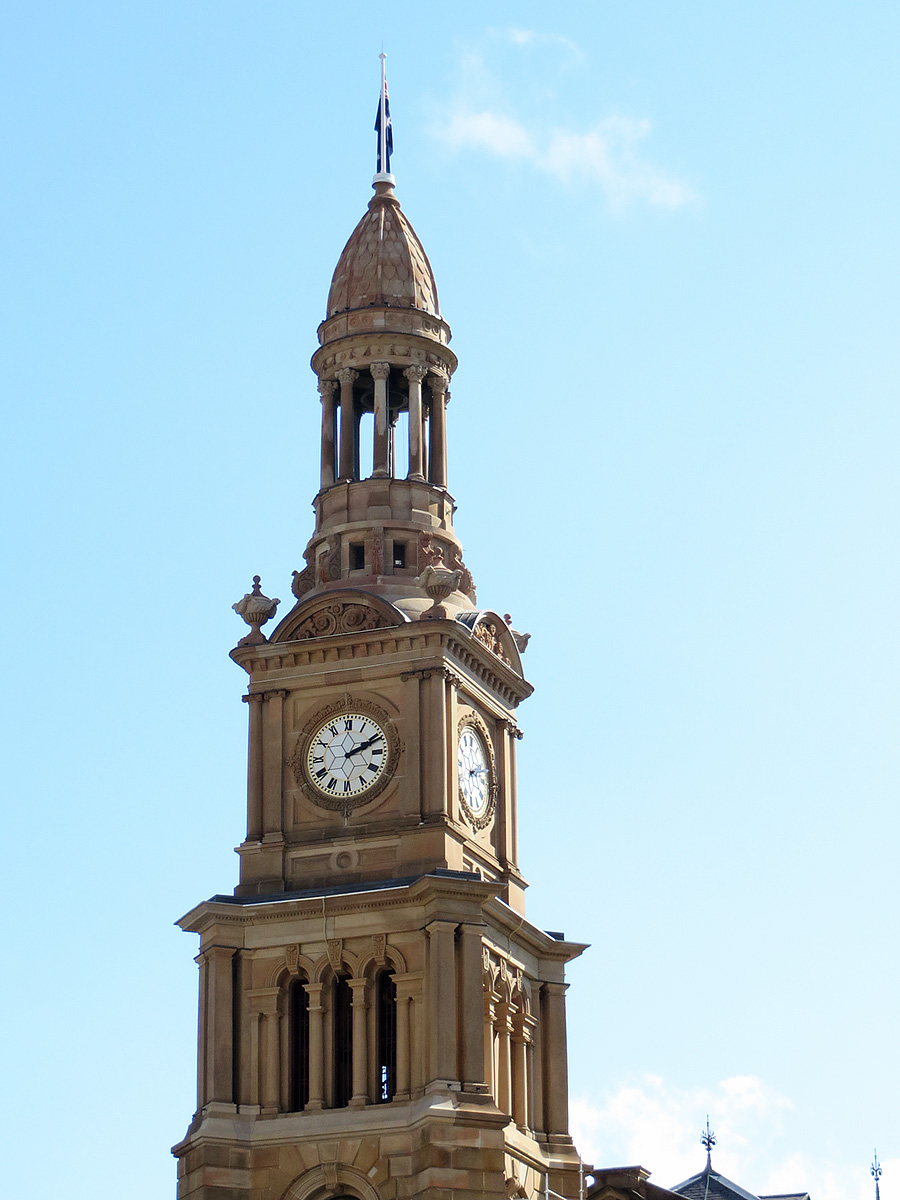
Clock tower

The Town Hall was built from local Sydney sandstone in the grand Victorian Second Empire style, inspired by the French Second Empire Hôtel de Ville in Paris. The Town Hall has been described as having "lavishly ornamented composition with focal tower and fanciful roofs". The building consists of the original Town Hall, mayoral suites and town clerk's offices. These were designed by J. H. Wilson in 1866, having won a civic competition to design a town hall for the rapidly-growing city. Construction of his initial designs were completed under the architectural direction of Albert Bond in 1869. Wilson also designed the interior of the original Town Hall meeting room. The clock tower was completed in 1873 to the design of E. and T. Bradbridge and whose clock was installed in 1884. The Centennial Hall and associated offices and entrances were designed by Thomas H. Sapsford in 1883, but after his death were completed by architects David McBeath, John Hennessy and George McRae in 1889.

Sydney Town Hall is a monumental brick and stone structure. The building houses the Sydney City Council Chamber, reception rooms, the Centennial Hall and offices for the Lord Mayor and elected councillors. It is on four levels referred to as Lower Ground, Ground, First and Second floors and there are some intermediate levels in the area of the stage and organ. The building was built in two main stages the first being the vestibule and offices (1869–1880) and the second being the two halls (1880–1889). On the lowest level of the second stage is the Lower Town Hall, main north and south stairs (which extend to the first floor), corridors, backstage facilities, north and south entrances, and ancillary spaces. The north corridor links via the enclosed colonnade to Town Hall House to the west. On the lowest level of the first stage, which is about a metre higher, are vaults in the centre, corridors and offices around the outside.

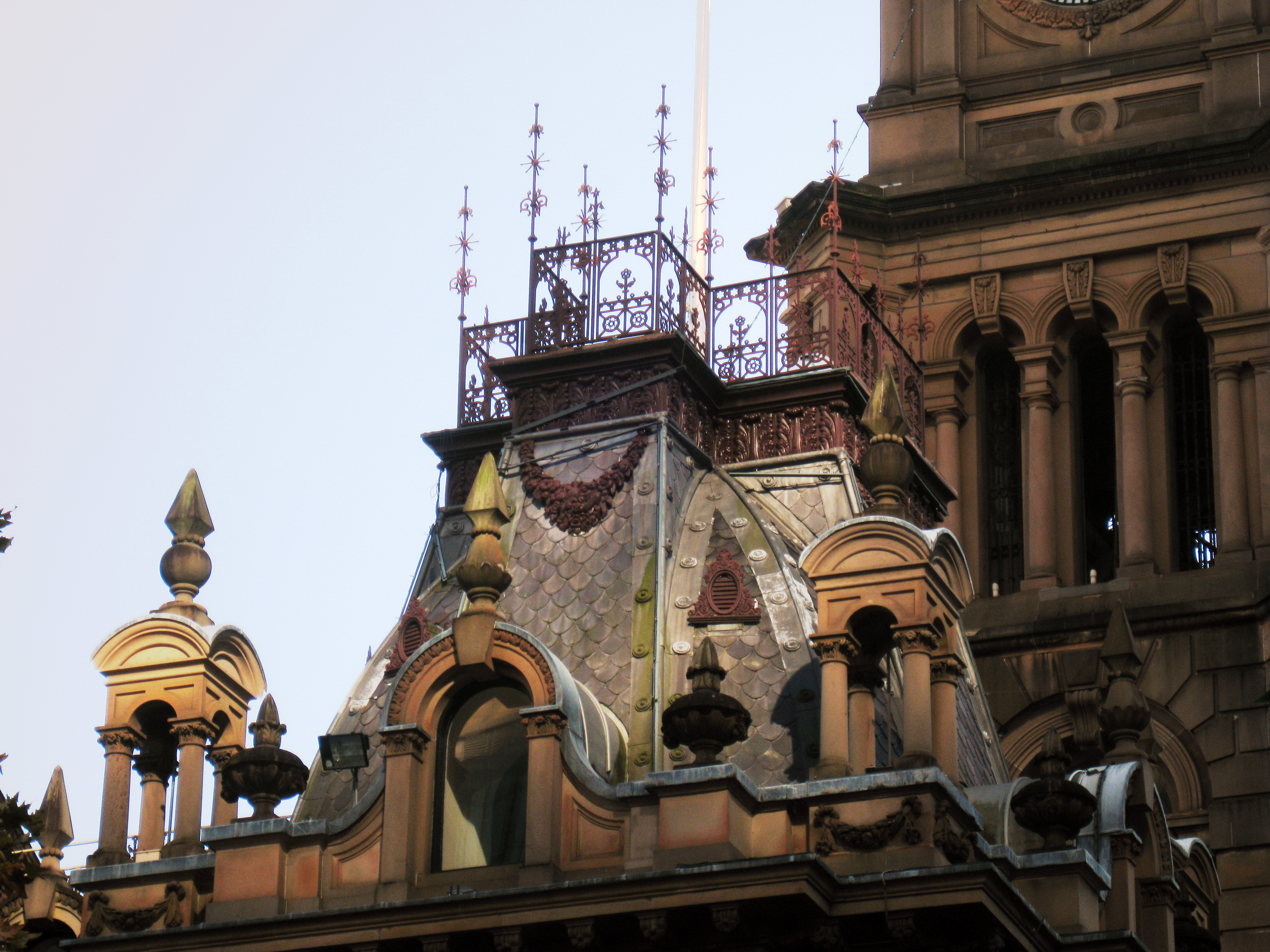
Mansard roof detailing

On the ground floor of the second stage is the Main Hall. This is the main space in the building and is three storeys high. At the west end is the stage and the organ which is under a proscenium arch and behind which are facilities for performers. There are galleries on the other three sides accessed from the second floor with clerestory windows above. On the north and south sides are wide corridors, main stairs, entrances and rooms containing offices and toilets. The entrances open onto balconies and grand stairs leading to the street. The main space on the ground floor of the first stage is the Vestibule which is an elaborate two storey space topped by an oval shaped curved glass dome. The vestibule has wide corridors on three sides and around the perimeter are rooms containing offices and some public spaces. Centrally located on the eastern side is the octagonal entrance foyer over which is the clock tower. This leads off the main entrance to the building, the George Street stair. The Grand Stair is to the north of the foyer and includes a passenger lift.

The Centennial Hall contains the Grand Organ, the world's largest pipe organ with tubular pneumatic action, built from 1886 to 1889 and installed in 1890 by the English firm of William Hill & Son. The organ possesses one of only two full-length 64 ft (20 m) organ stops in the world (the Contra-Trombone in the pedal). Before the opening of the Sydney Opera House and its Concert Hall, the Town Hall was Sydney's premier concert hall, and many notable performances took place there.

On the first floor in the second stage are the corridors servicing the galleries in the Main Hall, the north and south stairs, rooms containing offices and toilets. In the backstage area are performers facilities and there are links on each side to Town Hall House which is west of the Town Hall. On the first floor in the first stage, on either side of the upper portion of the vestibule are the main spaces on this level; the Council Chamber and the Reception Room. A corridor to the east of the Vestibule serves these spaces and offices along the east of the building. The Grand Staircase ends at this level and a spiral stair under the clock tower leads to the second floor. The second floor is mainly in the first stage of the building and is offices and ancillary spaces. There are two main spaces on the north and south of the dome, linked by a corridor to rooms within the corner pavilions and to the lift, which continues to this level. Walkways on the roof provide access to storerooms in the roofs of the pavilions over the North and South entrances. To the west of the Main Hall two spiral stairs give access to the roof. The spiral stair in the clock tower continues giving access to higher levels where the bell and the clock mechanism are located. The counterweights for the clock are located within the walls at each corner of the tower.

=== Construction ===
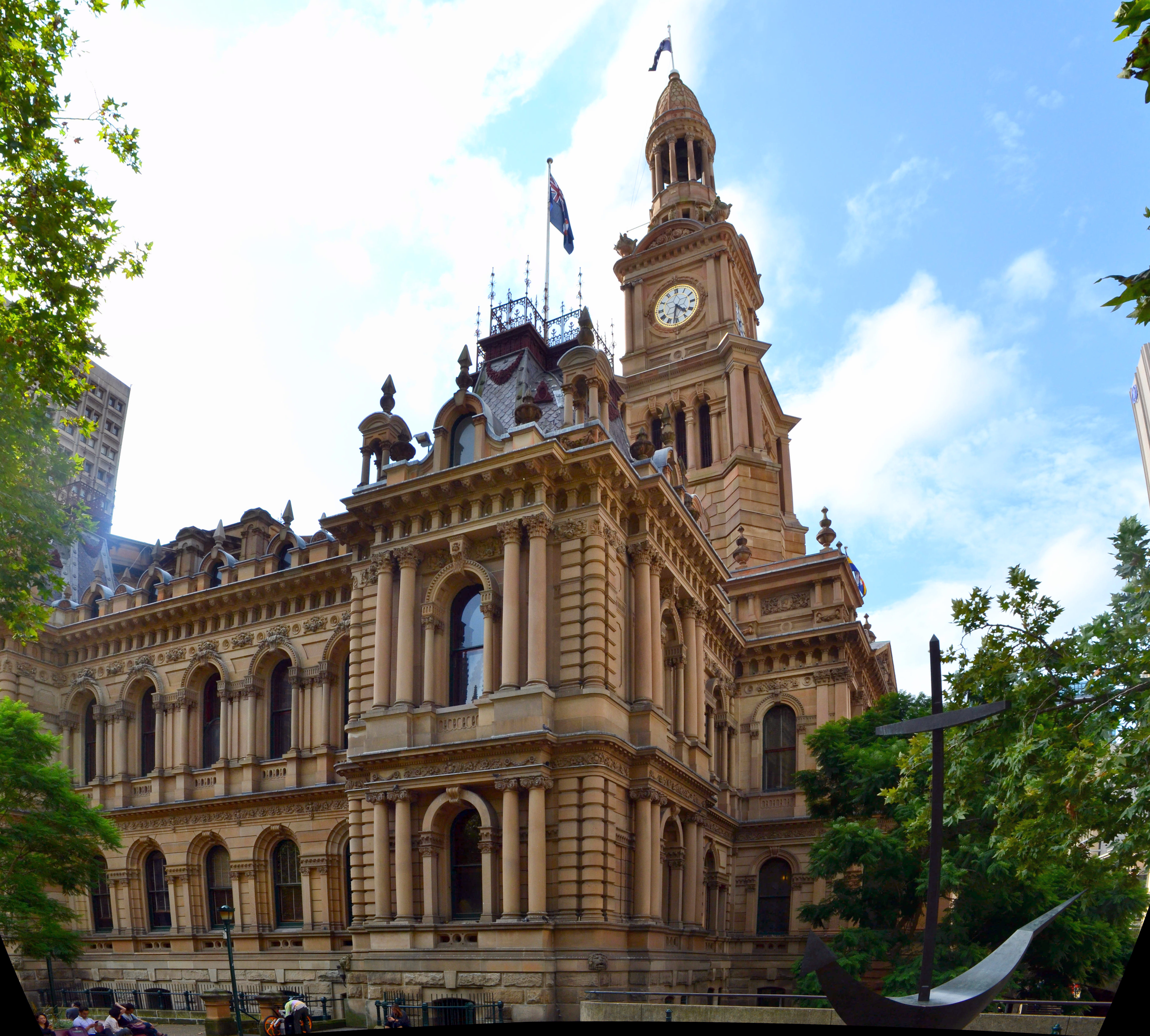
Part of the southern facade

Sydney Town Hall is a composite brick and stone construction. The external walls and elements such as the upper levels of the clock tower, balconies and colonnades, external stairs and roof top decoration are of Sydney "yellowblock" sandstone. Internal faces of walls and internal walls are rendered and/or plastered brick. The building is supported on brick and stone strip foundations or brick piers. The first stage mostly has timber floor structures and floors except for the corridors and the vaults. The second stage has concrete floors vaulted between steel beams, and has some timber floors. The floors are tile or timber over the structure.

The roof structures of the first stage are timber with trusses spanning the two larger spaces. The nature of the structure supporting the vestibule dome and the adjacent rooms is not known. The second stage utilises a steel roof structure with massive riveted steel girders spanning the main hall. Over these girders are wrought iron and steel trusses forming the pitched roof. The structure of the flat roof areas is concrete vaulted between steel beams. The domed pavilions have a steel structure. The roofing is slate to pitched roof areas, membrane to flat areas and corrugated steel to the curved roofed pavilions.

Internally the walls and ceilings to important spaces are elaborately finished in plaster. There is a hierarchy of decorative treatments reflecting the importance and use of spaces. Less important spaces are finished with render, sometimes lined to resemble stone. Fine timber joinery to windows and doors is cedar and there are many stained and leadlight glass windows to major spaces.

=== Internal decoration ===
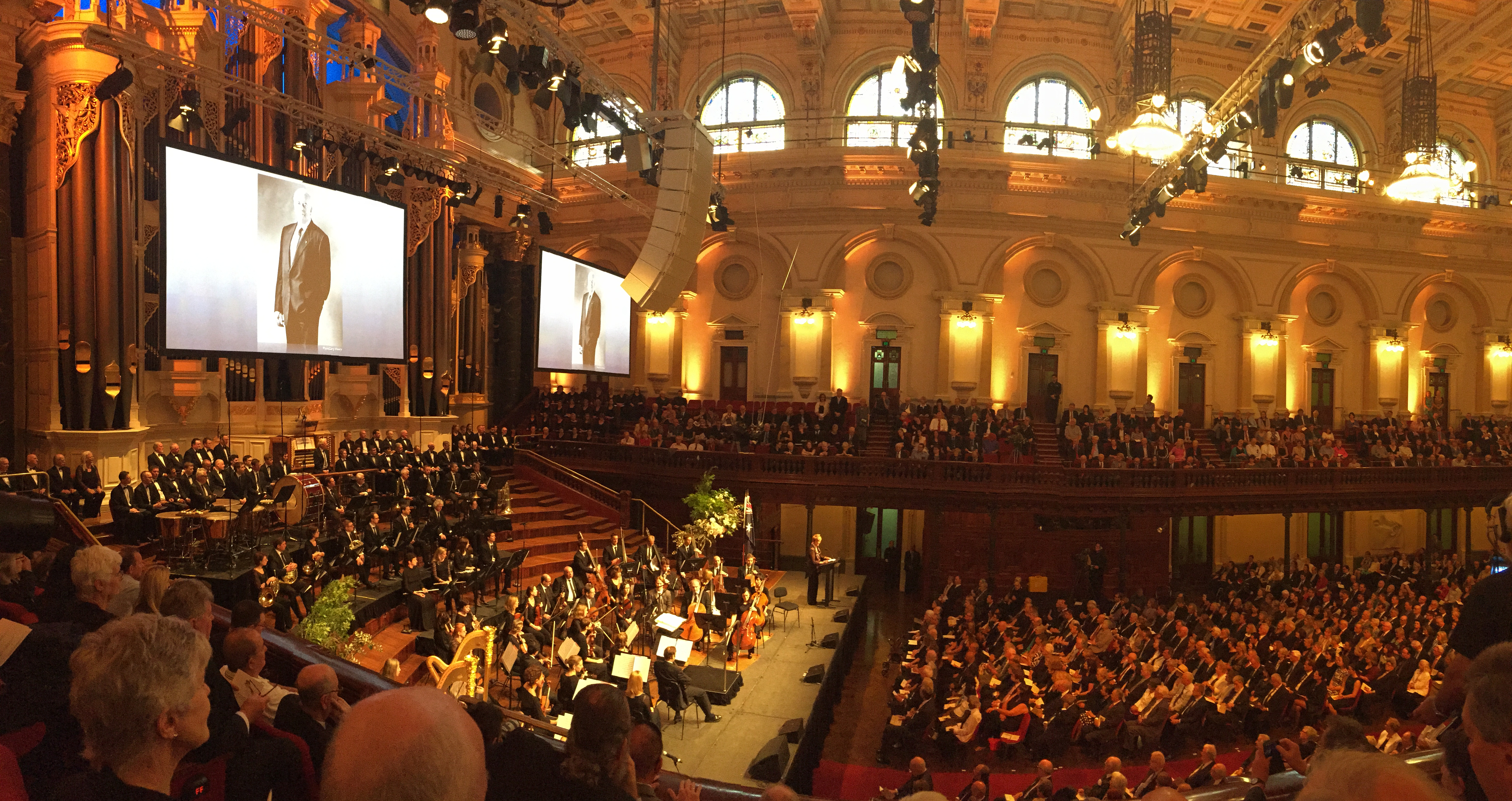
The interior of the Centennial Hall during a service

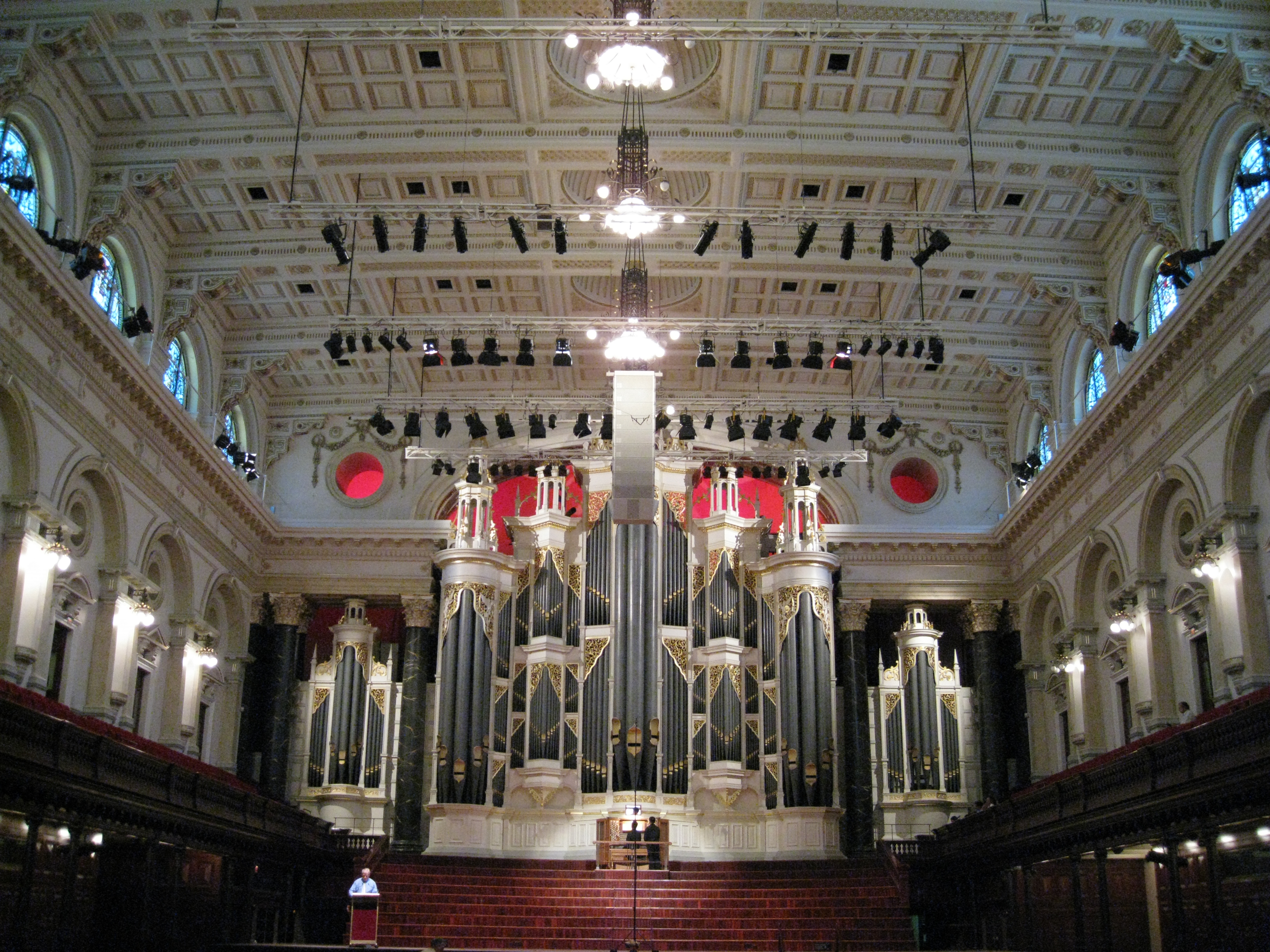
The Centennial Hall with the grand organ

The Town Hall was temporarily occupied in 1875 however the finishing of the ground floor rooms was not undertaken until 1878 and the finishing of the second floor rooms was undertaken to coincide with the opening of the Main Hall. The decoration of the ground floor chambers and corridors of the first stage was designed by David McBeath and the decoration of the Vestibule by Albert Bond. All of these interiors exhibit a high level of ornament to all surfaces. The High Victorian interior of the Vestibule was finished in a variety of colours (at least forty) and surface finishes such as marbelling, faux sheen, waxing and graining as well as tinted plaster were employed (or specified). Sharp corners and crisp details were obtained through the use of Keene's Cement, a hard plaster which could be oiled and polished, coloured or painted. Polished plaster was also employed in the first floor rooms, such as the Reception Room and the corridors.

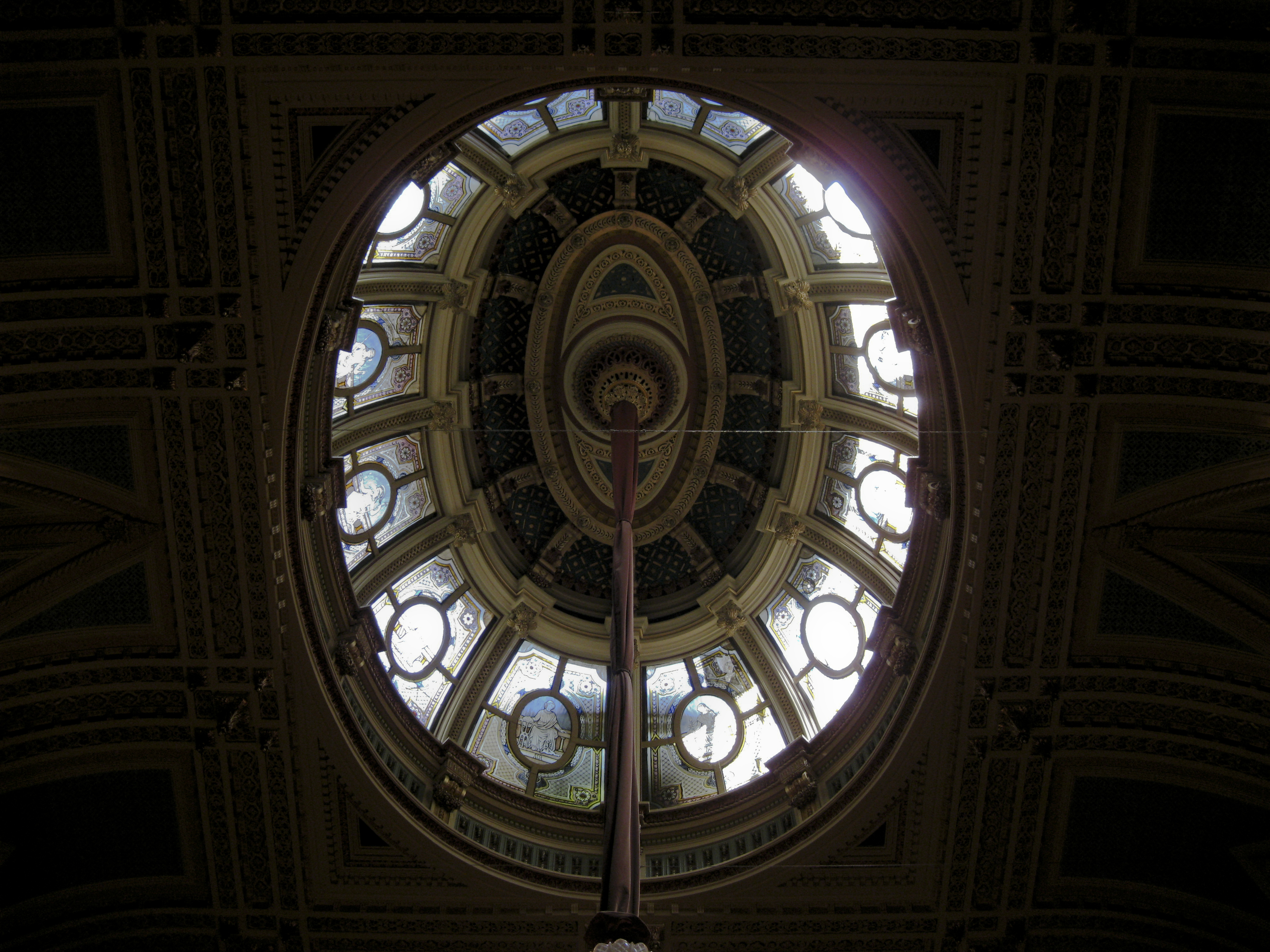
Domed ceiling

One of the characteristic features of the decoration of the first stage of the Town Hall is the use of embossed (or etched) glass. The milky design is actually raised and the polished sections recessed. The fanlights to the offices and the first floor windows into the Vestibule feature Australian flora and fauna as decorative motifs. This is one of the earliest known uses of the use of Australian motifs to decorate architectural elements. In addition symbolic decoration is employed.

The High Victorian interiors went out of fashion quickly and the designers of the second stage, in particular John Hennessy, were influenced by the Aesthetic Movement. The first floor chambers including the Council Chamber, the Finance Room, the Aldermen's refreshment room (now the Aldermen's WC's), the Reception Room, the Town Clerk's and the Lord Mayor's offices and the first floor corridor and Grand Staircase were redecorated between 1888 and 1890 with Aesthetic Movement style decorative schemes.

The corridors and staircases of the second stage of the Town Hall were designed in a far less ornate manner. Throughout the corridors and the Main Hall the hard white plaster was given a polished finish. Doors were added, c. 1890, to the Vestibule to separate it from the Main Hall. The rooms were subsequently repainted many times in simple one colour schemes.

=== Present day ===
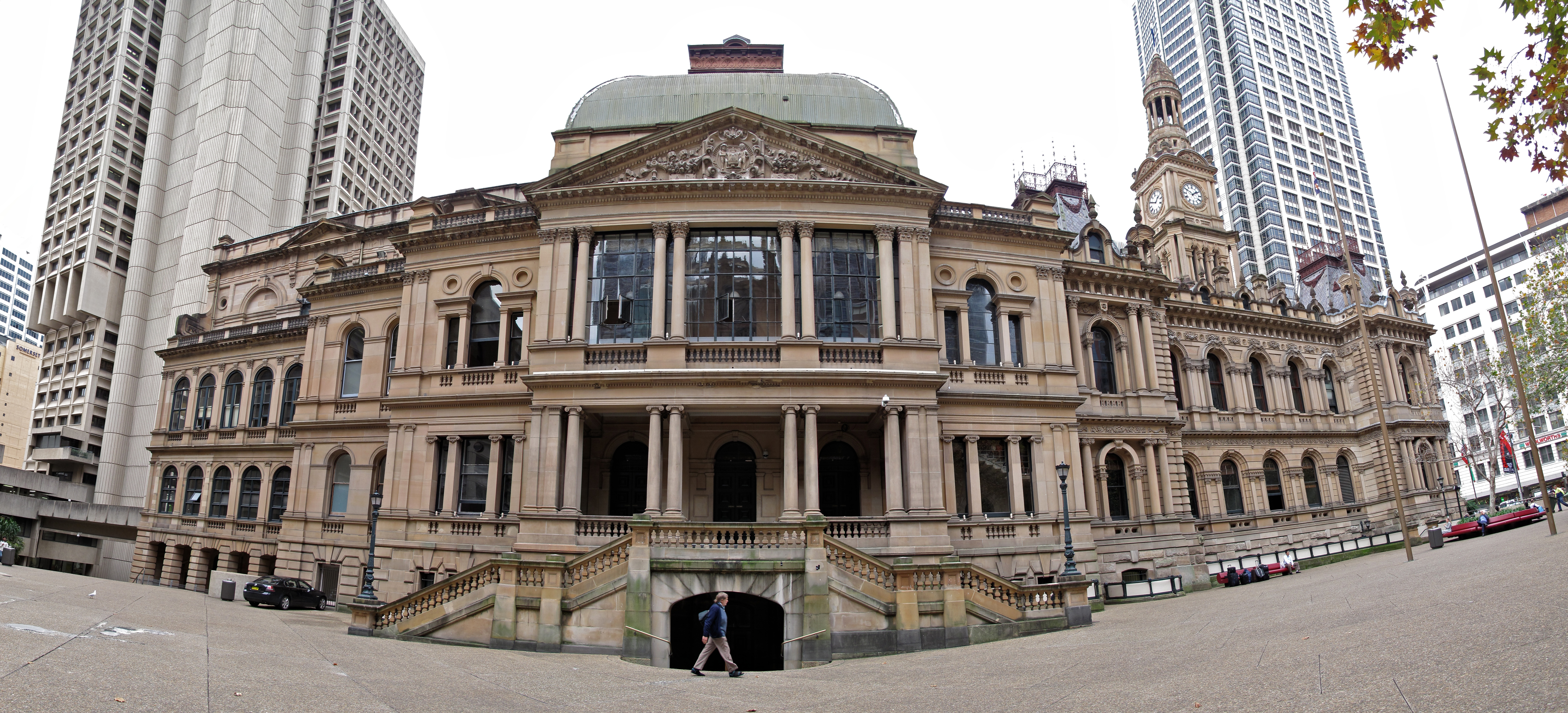
Southern facade of the building

The Sydney Town Hall still serves as an important presence and meeting place for the City of Sydney to this very day. The building itself regularly undergoes cleaning and restoration to preserve it for future generations. Additionally, it has been rendered with sustainability by improving energy efficiency, including smart light sensors, energy efficient lighting, new roofing insulation to moderate building temperature, solar panels, and new hydraulics and storm water infrastructure.

=== Condition ===
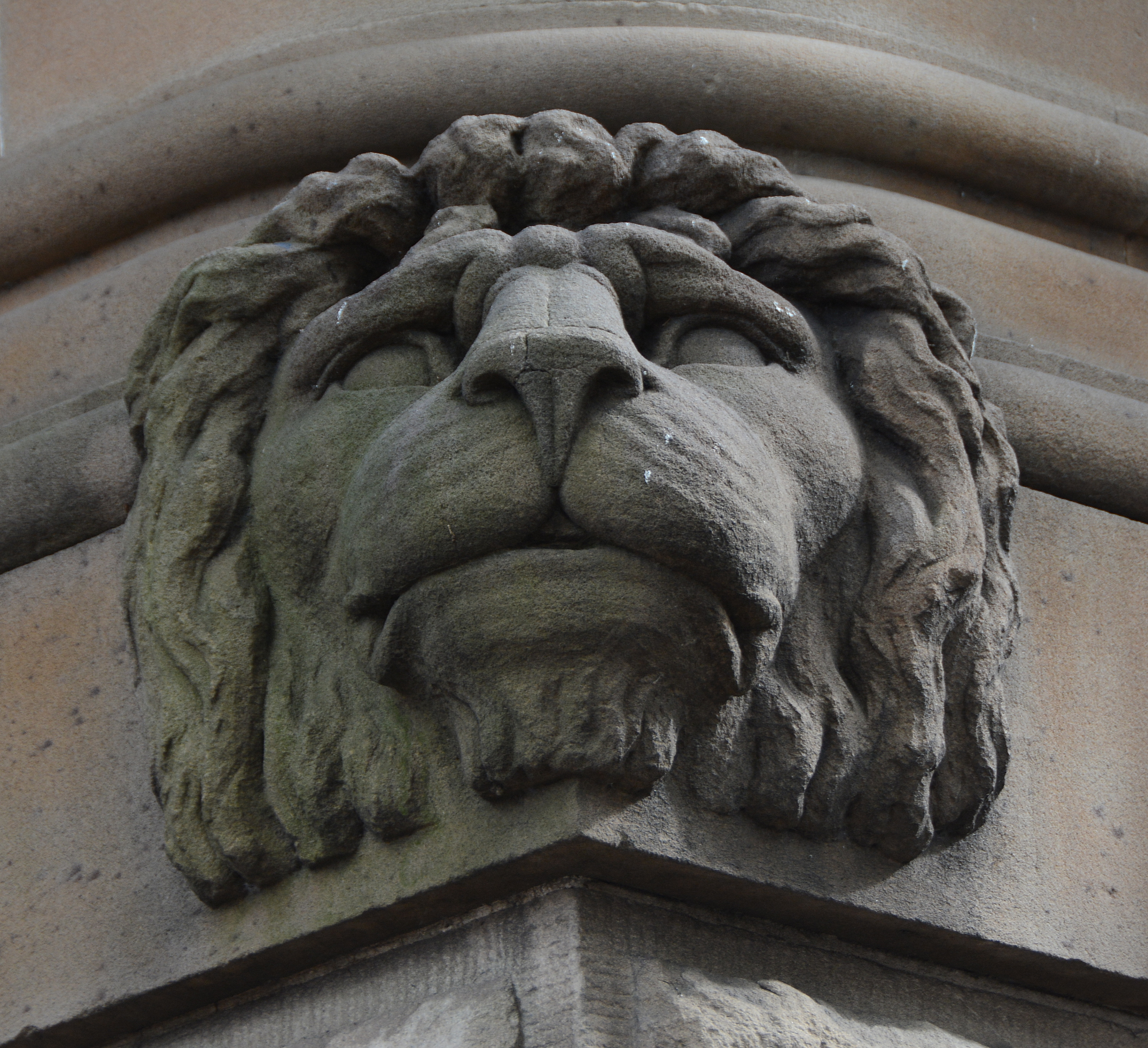
Sandstone lion on north side of building

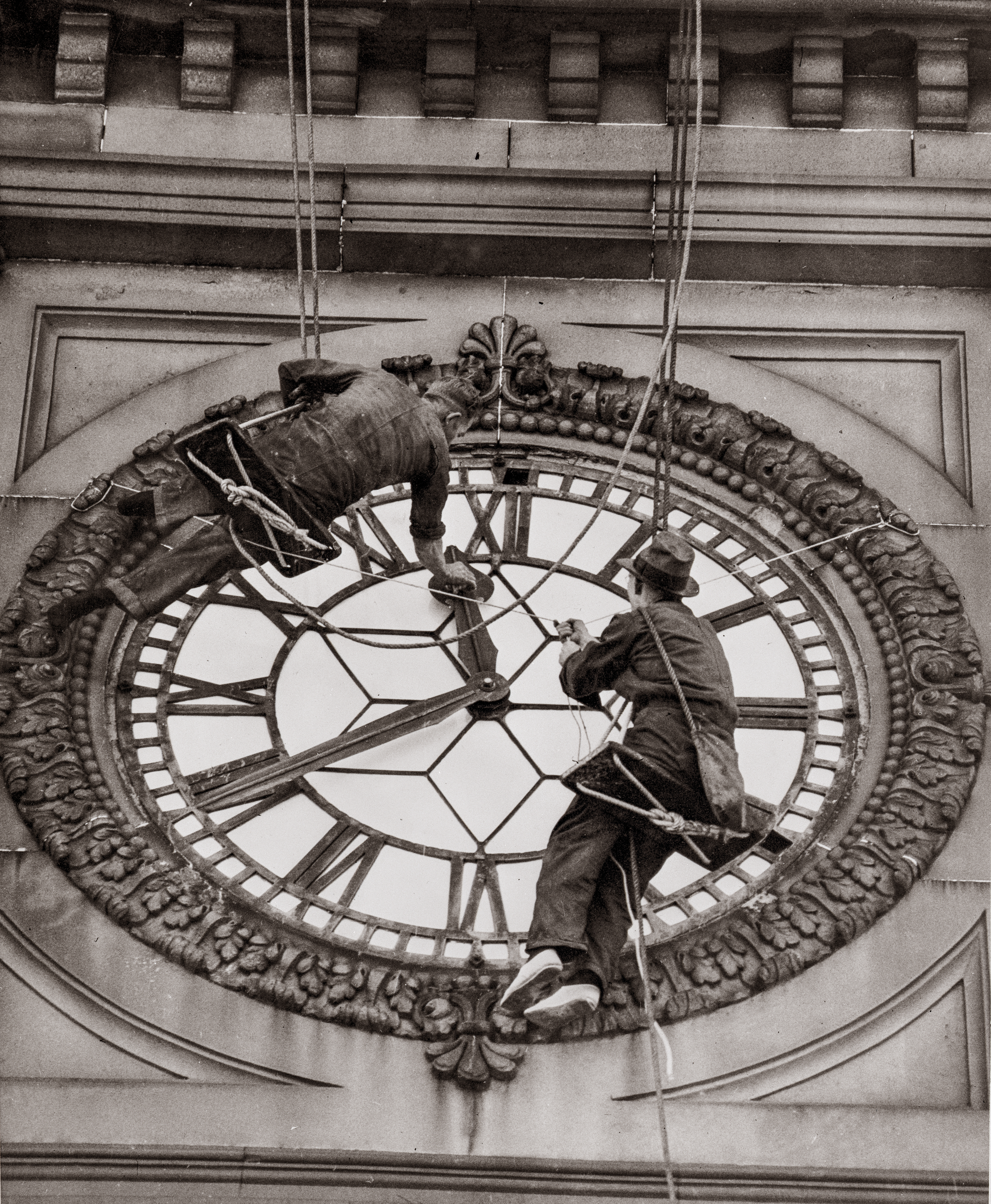
Cleaning the clock face of Sydney Town Hall, George Street Sydney, 1937

As at 16 May 2003, the building is in excellent condition. As at 2003 maintenance is required to stonework on the north, west and south facades.

The site has exceptional archaeological potential because Town Hall is built within the former Old Sydney Burial Ground. The cemetery was Sydney's first permanent cemetery and it is estimated that at least 2000 burials were made in the Old Sydney Burial Ground between 1792 and 1820. The majority of the people who died in Sydney would have been buried there, convict and prominent citizen alike, unless they were buried on their own land. Certain parts of the cemetery were set aside for particular people or groups (i.e. New South Wales Corps' area was near the Druitt and George Street Corner).

After it closed in 1820 the state of the cemetery deteriorated so that in 1845 evidence was given to a committee inquiring into its future that most of the graves were no longer marked and that it would be impossible to find them without clearing the land down to coffins. Notice was given in the Sydney Morning Herald that remains of the interred "so far as they can by reasonable search be discovered" would be reburied at Rockwood Cemetery. Since that time, works in the vicinity of the Town Hall regularly expose remains of graves. Excavation of services in the footpaths along George and Druitt Streets in the late nineteenth and early twentieth centuries found evidence of graves. Excavation for Town Hall railway station in 1929 exposed coffins and headstones. Several brick tombs were recorded in 1974 when the Town Hall arcade was being excavated.

In 1991 works to Town Hall revealed a brick tomb and several graves so the potential for the proposed 2003 works to disturb graves of exceptional significance is considered to be high. Remains from the site have rare research potential for learning more about the health and well-being of the early settlers.

The Sydney Town Hall is largely intact. Most changes have been layers over the original construction and the stages of construction are evident in the fabric. The function of the place is an essential part of its integrity. It continues to be used for the purpose for which it was designed.

There are numerous graves still intact below the existing foundations of Town Hall and within close vicinity of the site.

=== Modifications and dates ===
There have been few modifications after the completion of the second stage of works associated with the Town Hall building. In 1906 a lift was added and the main stair altered, and the Lord Mayor's private rooms were converted into the Lady Mayoress suite.

In 1892 a porte cochère was added to the front of the building. In 1934 the main entrance was remodelled with the demolition of the porte cochère and its replacement with a flight of steps. During World War Two the Lower Town Hall was altered with additional columns to strengthen the structure.

In the 1970s Town Hall House was added to the rear, earlier offices demolished, a two-storey wing added on Druitt Street, which involved the removal of part of the north stair, Sydney Square was formed, earlier fences and gardens removed and pebblecrete paving laid around the building.

In 1990 to 1992 a restoration program replaced some marble to the front stair and sandstone on the east facade, the vestibule and Main Hall were redecorated, stormwater and sewage systems were upgraded, and a protective roof installed over the Vestibule Dome.

The area between Town Hall and St Andrew's Cathedral will be renovated from 2027 at an estimated cost of $35 million.

== Town Hall Square project ==
Since 1982, there have been plans to redevelop the space near Town Hall into a city square.

Town Hall Square is a proposed public square opposite Sydney Town Hall. The City of Sydney council, led by Lord Mayor Clover Moore has proposed the project. The site is occupied by seven buildings, including a Woolworths supermarket, retail stores and a pub, which would be demolished. It has been subject to opposition from the Shop, Distributive and Allied Employees Association, Business Sydney and New South Wales premier Chris Minns.

== Heritage listing ==
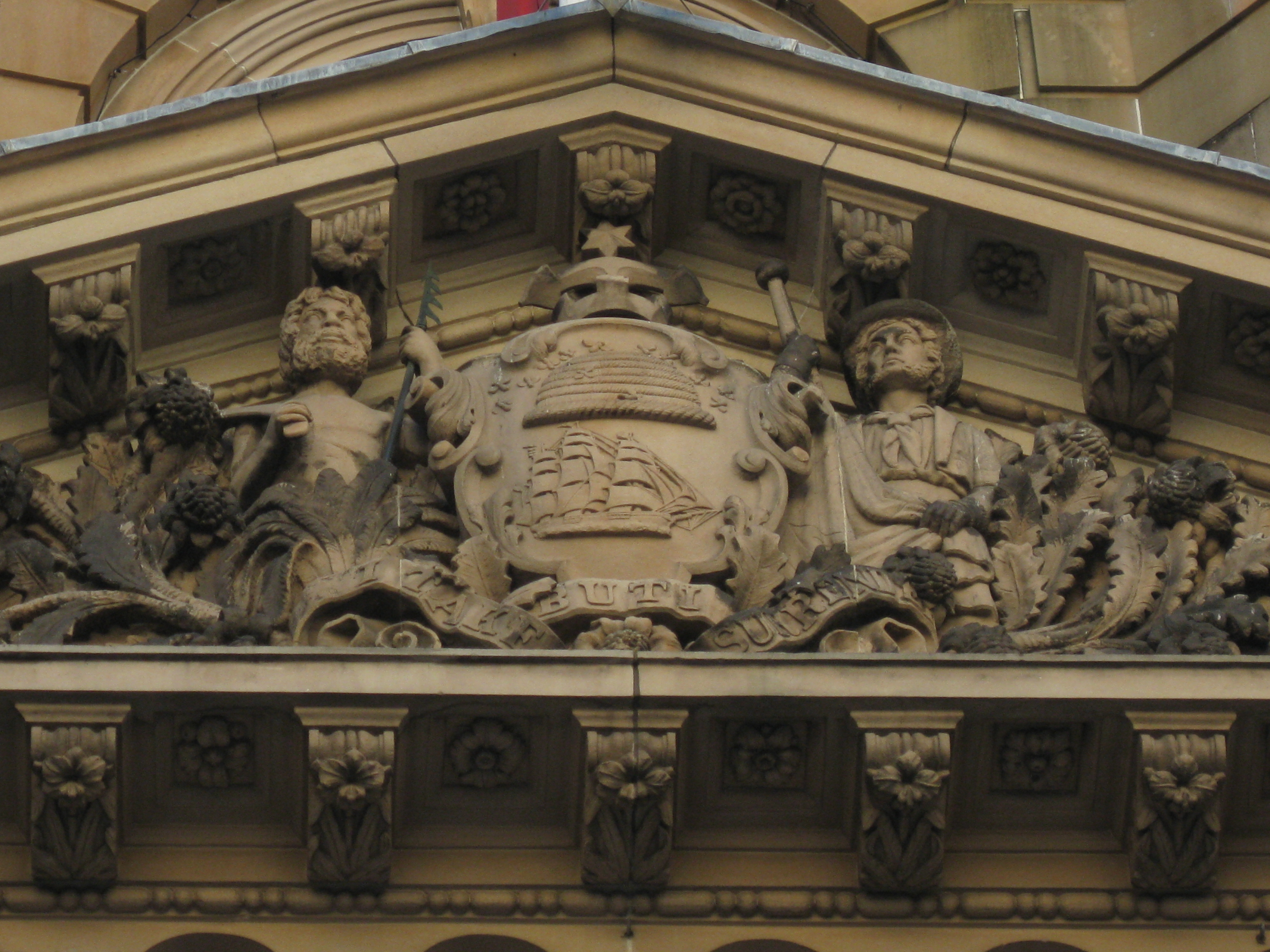
An early version of the City of Sydney coat of arms on the portico façade of the Town Hall.

As at 2 June 2009, Sydney Town Hall is significant for its continuing use as the offices of the Council of the City of Sydney and as the city's civic and cultural centre. It is the centre of city politics and the place where decisions are made about the city. Major civic events are celebrated here and the hall acts as the venue for major cultural events, benefit concerts and rituals. It has high social value for all sections of the community and is used regularly as the meeting place for political protests and rallies.

The building with its clock tower and steps is a city landmark and symbol of the city, both historically and today. It is a work of Second Empire Style architecture in Australia featuring corner towers, domed pavilions, pedimented breakfront entries, a hierarchy of decorative orders, columned and pedimented window treatment, venetian windows and elaborate decoration. It exhibits the high level of craftsmanship, quality of materials and incorporates technological advances.

Decorative features of exceptional significance include the vestibule glass dome, the organ, mosaic floors, carved cedar joinery and carved sandstone and marble. It features the first known use of Australian motifs in the etched glass. Exceptional windows by Lucien Henry also feature Australian flora.

The growth of the building reflects the growth and importance of the city. The development of the city coat of arms is also recorded in the building fabric.

The site and surrounding land has high historical and archaeological importance as it represents the location of the former Old Sydney Burial Ground. The cemetery was Sydney's first permanent cemetery, set out in September 1792 by Governor Phillip and the Reverend Richard Johnson. It was closed in 1820 when the Sandhills or Brickfield cemetery was opened. Works within Town Hall and its vicinity regularly expose remains of graves.

As an archaeological resource, Old Sydney Burial Ground has high scientific research potential as it contains material culture related to a seminal phase of the nation's history. As a burial ground which includes remains of some of the city's founding pioneers and one of Sydney's oldest European religious and ceremonial sites, the Old Sydney Burial Ground has outstanding social value to the people of Sydney and Australia. The Old Sydney Burial Ground is a site of State heritage significance.

The place is associated with many important people including politicians, designers, artists as well as performers and community figures and names are recorded in the fabric. There are important associated collections of records and of items such as art works which enhance understanding of the place and research and educational value.

Sydney Town Hall was listed on the New South Wales State Heritage Register on 5 March 2010 having satisfied a range of heritage criteria.

== See also ==
- List of town halls in Sydney
- Architecture of Sydney
