= William Hill & Son =

Organ builders

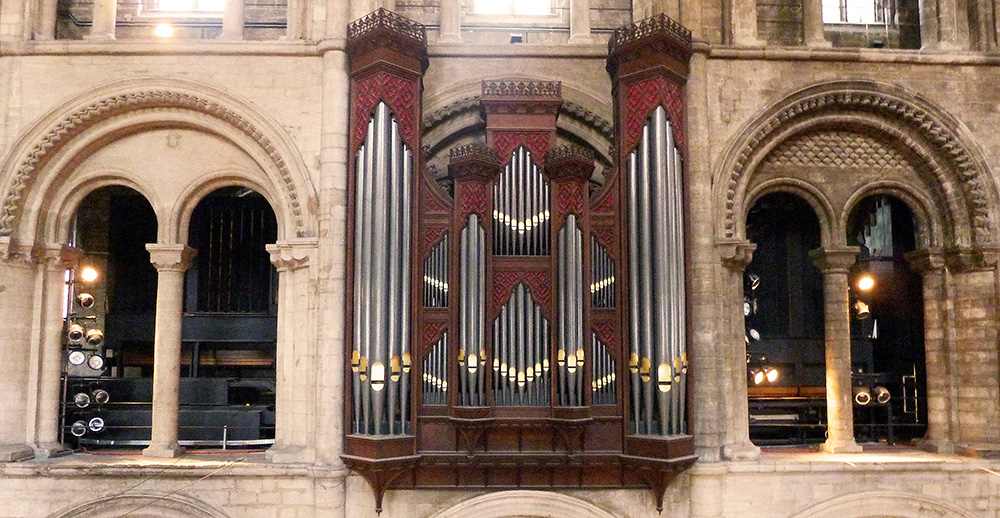
Hill Organ of Peterborough Cathedral

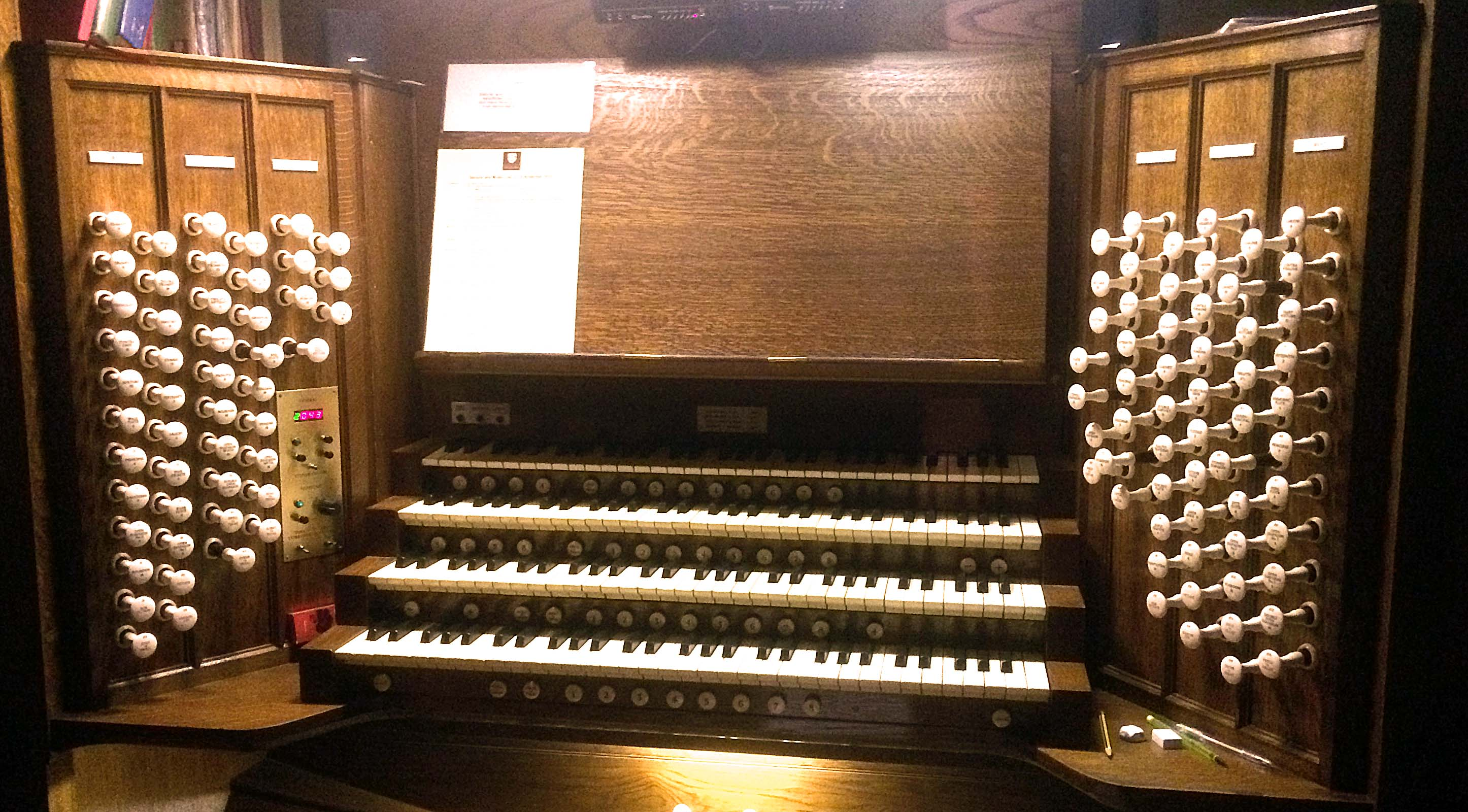
Console of the Hill Organ at Peterborough Cathedral

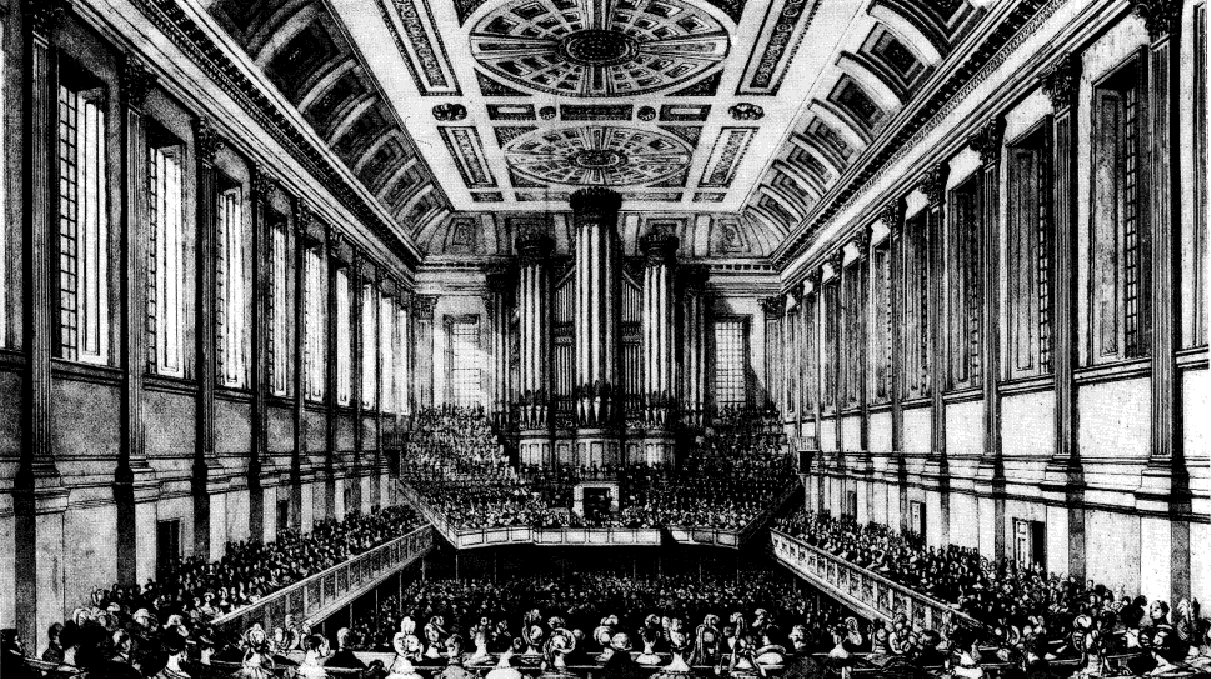
Birmingham Town Hall

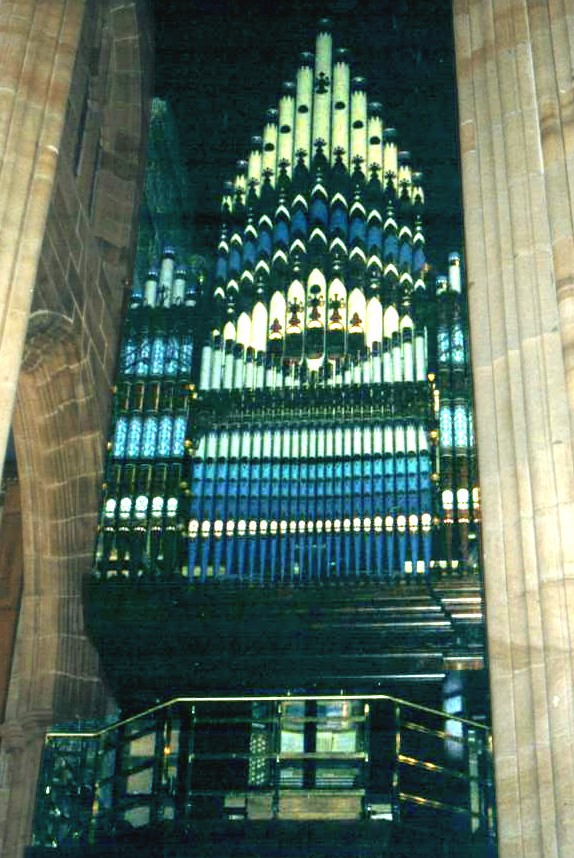
St Andrew's Cathedral, Sydney

William Hill & Son was one of the main organ builders in England during the 19th century.

== The founder ==
William Hill was born in Spilsby, Lincolnshire, in 1789. He married Mary, the daughter of organ-builder Thomas Elliot, on 30 October 1818 in St Pancras Parish Church, and worked for Thomas Elliott from 1825. The company was known as Elliott and Hill until Elliott died in 1832.

After William Hill's death in 1870 at his home near Regents Park he was buried in Highgate cemetery in north London. A memorial window was installed in the church at Spilsby, Lincolnshire.

== The company ==
On Elliot's death in 1832, William Hill inherited the firm. In 1837, he formed a partnership with Frederick Davison, who left in the following year to form a partnership with John Gray, Gray and Davison.

From 1832, William Hill's elder son William joined him in the firm. From 1855, William Hill's younger son Thomas joined the company and took control after his father's death in 1870.

When Thomas died in 1893, the firm continued under his son, Arthur George Hill, until 1916 when it was amalgamated with Norman & Beard into a huge organ-building concern as William Hill & Son & Norman & Beard Ltd. later shortened to Hill, Norman & Beard.

Examples of the firm's work, in order, are:-

- Birmingham Town Hall, 1832 was rebuilt in 1890 (Thomas Hill) and again in 1932 (Willis), with significant restoration work occurring in 1984 and 2007.
- King's College Chapel, Cambridge, 1834, 1859, 1889 and 1911. Rebuilt and enlarged by Harrison & Harrison in 1934
- St James's Palace, London 1837, organ for Chapel Royal commissioned by William IV, donated to St James the Great Barrow in Furness by Queen Victoria 1868, replaced by a second Hill organ
- All Saints Church, Turvey, 1838, significantly enlarged by Hill in 1851, 1854 and again in 1886. Elaborate decorated pipe scheme.
- St James Spilsby. Lincolnshire, (Hill family parish church), 1840, Swell added in 1866
- Westminster Abbey, 1848 updated and expanded by the same firm in 1884, 1895 and 1909 (fine organ case designed by J L Pearson, 1895). Replaced by a new Harrison & Harrison organ in 1937 retaining some Hill pipework.
- Kidderminster Town Hall, Worcestershire, 1855
- Ulster Hall, Belfast, 1861-2, the gift of Andrew Mulholland, the mayor of Belfast, rebuilt by Wm Hill & Sons 1903, restored by Mander 1978 with some tonal changes
- St Andrew's Cathedral, Sydney 1866, rebuilt by Hill, Norman & Beard and Orgues Létourneau
- Truro Public Rooms, 1868-9, nothing known of its subsequent career
- Ullet Road Unitarian Church, Liverpool, 1869
- St Peter's Church, Streatham, 1870
- Holy Name Church, Manchester, 1871
- Bangor Cathedral, 1871 enlarged by the firm in 1896 and by others since
- St John's Church, Torquay, 1872
- Melbourne Town Hall, opened 1872, destroyed by fire 1925
- Holy Trinity Church, Gosport, 1874, rebuild of organ purchased from the Duke of Chandos by parishioners in 1747.
- St Paul's, Burton upon Trent, 1874. The Hill organ was moved to Trinity Methodist Church, Burton, in 1896, and then in 2012 to Sankt-Afra-Kirche in the Berlin suburb of Gesundbrunnen and inaugurated on 22 November 2015. It is regarded as the most significant English organ in Germany.
- St Peter's Church, Mundham, 1877
- Adelaide Town Hall, 1877, reconstructed and installed at the Barossa Regional Gallery, Tanunda, South Australia, reopened 2014
- Corpus Christi College Oxford in the chapel, 1880
- Little Malvern Priory, Worcestershire, 1882, historical restoration by Nicholson & Co, 2019
- Lichfield Cathedral, 1884 new organ supplied which has since been altered
- Eton College, 1885 famous college chapel organ in lavishly decorated double case (designed by J L Pearson) featuring significant 1902 rebuilds and later restorations
- Sydney Town Hall Grand Organ, 1886–89, opened 1890, the largest organ in the world at the time of its construction, with a case designed by A. G. Hill
- St Mary's Church, Tottenham,1889 with alterations by the firm 3 years later, received Grade 1 listing in 2004 with Barker lever Action intact, manual air pump working and many stops, given its relatively small size.
- Thomas Coats Memorial Baptist Church, Paisley, 1890.
- St Peter and Paul's Old Cathedral Goulburn, NSW, Australia, 1890
- St Andrew's, Croydon, 1891 and a replacement in 1906
- All Saints Hove, 1894, enlarged in 1905 and encased in 1915 (elaborate case designed by F L Pearson)
- Peterborough Cathedral, 1894, subsequently Hill, Norman & Beard (1930/31), Harrison & Harrison (1980–present). Case designed by A. G. Hill.
- St Augustine's Church, Penarth, 1895
- Christ Church, Llanfairfechan, Wales, 1895/1902 (rebuilt)
- St Joseph's Church, Highgate, London, 1898 large instrument in unaltered condition
- Kilbarchan West Parish Church, 1904, transferred in 2018 to St Marienkirch, Prezlau, Germany, and reconstructed in 2024
- Selby Abbey, 1909
- Hull Garden Village Hall, 1910, destroyed by air raid 1942
- Christ Church / Crimean Memorial Church, Istanbul, 1911
- St Alban's Church, Ilford, England, 1914
