= Parnell =

Parnell or Parnells may refer to:

== People and fictional characters ==
- Parnell (surname), a list of people
- Parnell (given name), a list of people and a fictional character

== Places ==
=== New Zealand ===
- Parnell, New Zealand, a suburb of Auckland
  - Parnell (New Zealand electorate)

=== United States ===
- Parnell, Iowa, a city
- Parnell, Kansas, an unincorporated community
- Parnell, Michigan, an unincorporated community
- Parnell Township, Polk County, Minnesota
- Parnell Township, Traverse County, Minnesota
- Parnell, Missouri, a city
- Parnell, Wisconsin, an unincorporated community
- Parnell Knob, a mountain in Pennsylvania

== Sports clubs ==
- Parnell Rugby League Football Club, based in Auckland, New Zealand
- Cambridge Parnells GAA, a Gaelic football club in Cambridge, England
- Parnells GAA, a former Gaelic football club based in Coolock, Dublin, Ireland
- Stabannon Parnells GFC, a Gaelic football club based in Stabannon, County Louth, Ireland

== Transportation ==
- Parnell Street, Dublin, Ireland
- Parnell railway station, Parnell, New Zealand
- Parnell Tunnel, a railway tunnel under Parnell, New Zealand
- Parnell station, a former Chicago Transit Authority railway station

== Other uses ==
- Parnell (film), a 1937 film about Charles Stewart Parnell, starring Clark Gable and Myrna Loy
- Parnell baronet, a title in the Baronetage of Ireland
- ACG Parnell College, a private school in Parnell, New Zealand

== See also ==
- Pernell (disambiguation)
- Purnell (disambiguation)
