= House of David (commune) =

Communal religious society in Michigan, US

The House of David
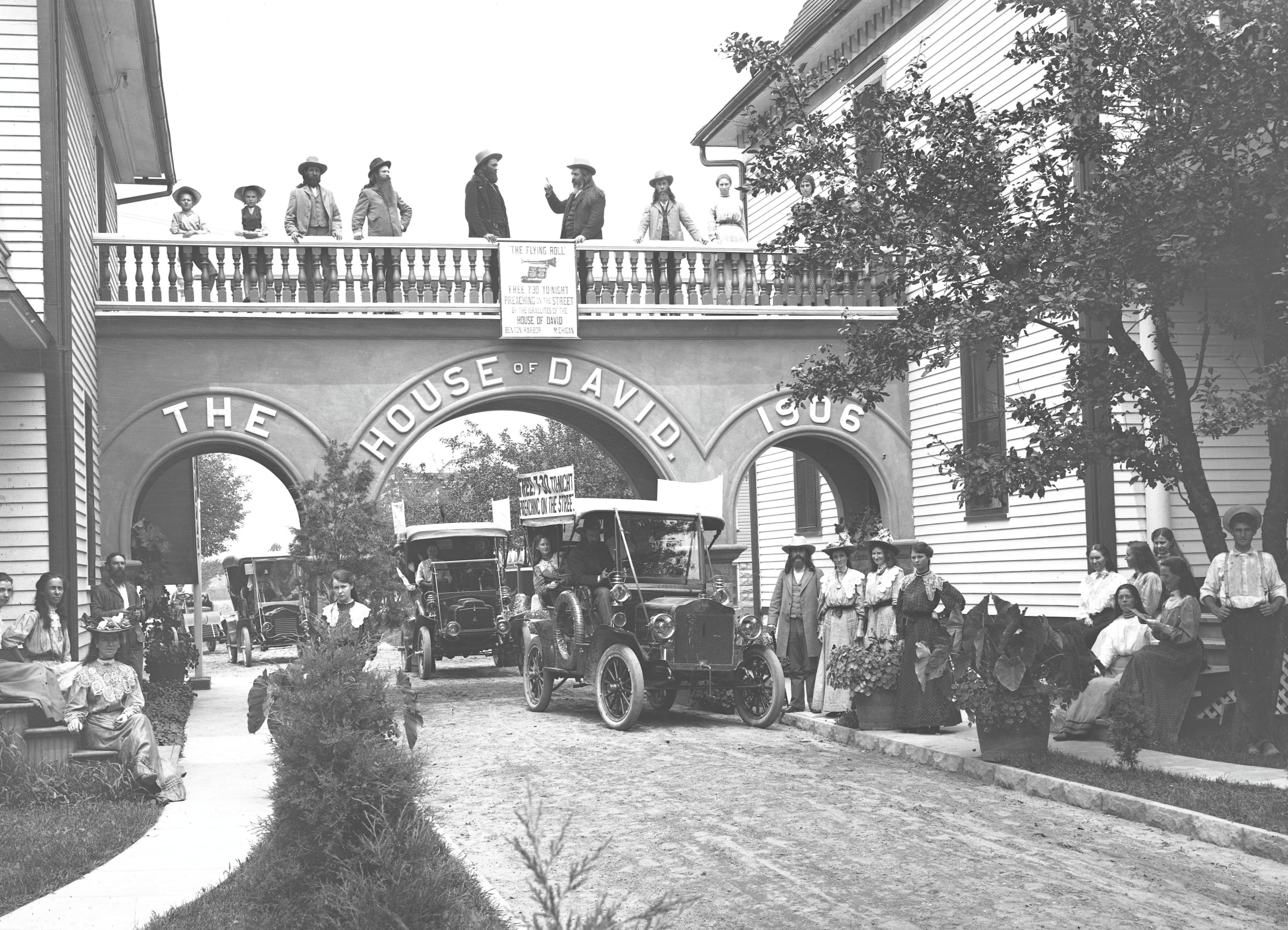
- Members of the House of David at the colony in Benton Harbor, c. 1909. Benjamin and Mary Purnell are right of center.

Founder
- Benjamin and Mary Purnell

Regions with significant populations
- Benton Harbor, Michigan

Languages
- english
- Mary's City of David
- U.S. National Register of Historic Places
- Michigan State Historic Site
- Location within Michigan Location within the United States
- Interactive map
- Location: 1158 E. Britain Ave., Benton Charter Township, Michigan; United States
- Coordinates: 42°6′32″N 86°25′51″W
- NRHP reference No.: 09000201
- Added to NRHP: April 15, 2009

The House of David (formally The Israelite House of David) is a Christian Israelite religious organization and commune founded in Benton Harbor, Michigan, in March 1903. It was co-founded by spouses Benjamin Purnell (1861–1927) and Mary Purnell (1862–1953). The Purnells claimed to be the successors to Joanna Southcott (1750–1814), a self-proclaimed prophetess who attracted a sizeable following in England during the last decade of the eighteenth century.

The House of David flourished in the 1900s and 1910s, but faced serious crises and legal scandals in the 1920s. Following Benjamin Purnell's death in 1927, a power struggle ensued over who would lead the movement, resulting in a schism and the commune splitting into two independent organizations in 1930: the original Israelite House of David, and, a breakaway group, the Israelite House of David as Reorganized by Mary Purnell, also known as Mary's City of David. Both groups are still active, although only a handful of members remain. The House of David is well known for their many successful business ventures including exhibition baseball teams, an amusement park, touring vaudeville bands, and their own brand of packaged food products.

There are three listings on the National Register of Historic Places associated with the House of David: Mary’s City of David, Eden Springs Park, and Shiloh House.

== History ==
=== Founding and Rise ===
In March of 1903, Benjamin and Mary Purnell moved from Fostoria, Ohio, to Benton Harbor, Michigan, with a small group of supporters to establish the House of David. The colony grew rapidly as people from in and around Benton Harbor as well as established Jezreelites from across the U.S. and Canada joined. The next year, Benjamin traveled to Australia where he preached to Christian Israelite communities in and around Melbourne. This led to eighty-five Israelites migrating to the U.S. to join the Benton Harbor colony. By 1910, there were over four hundred members of the House of David and the colony owned around one thousand acres of farmland. They began extensively cultivating fruit and vegetables and established a number of other businesses, including a cannery, a drying house, a carpentry shop, a coach factory, a foundry, a tailor shop, and a steam laundry, all powered by their own electric plant.

By 1916, the estimated number of members at the House of David was around one thousand. Outside of distributing religious literature and sending missionaries out to recruit prospective members, the House of David also advertised itself and raised funds to support its membership through its various enterprises.

=== Scandals, Death of Benjamin, and Split ===
During the 1920s, the House of David faced numerous legal challenges and intense public scrutiny from the press. Numerous lawsuits were brought against the commune by former members. Some sued for back wages or to regain property they relinquished upon joining the colony, while others were unhappy with their loved ones’ involvement in the colony. Critics disapproved of the House of David’s pacifist stance during World War I, and the colony faced accusations regarding the validity of their religion. Also criticized were the quality of the education provided to children at the commune, living conditions at the colony, and the organization's alleged manipulation of local politics. During these various lawsuits, dozens of former and current members accused Benjamin of sexual misconduct with women and girls at the colony. This culminated in a 1923 grand jury investigation, and Purnell's arrest in November 1926 on charges of statutory rape. The subsequent trial, in which the state of Michigan prosecuted Benjamin and the colony for religious fraud, engaging in "gross immoralities," perjury, and obstructing justice, was widely publicized and covered closely in newspapers and radio broadcasts across the U.S., Australia, Canada, and England. The trial resulted in over 15,000 pages of testimony. At the conclusion of the trial, which deemed the House of David a fraudulent religion, the presiding judge ordered the House of David put into receivership. However, just a month after the trial concluded Benjamin died from complications relating to diabetes and tuberculosis.

The “King of the House of David” died on December 16, 1927. Hundreds of Purnell's followers waited three days for his prophesized resurrection to be carried to paradise with him. He was buried on December 19.

The ruling was overturned by the Michigan Supreme Court less than a year later on the grounds the earlier decision violated the First Amendment's protection of freedom of religion.

Benjamin’s death fueled internal tensions within the colony, resulting in the colony splitting into rival factions in 1930: one led by Mary, Benjamin's wife and the co-founder of the House of David, and the other by Benjamin's hand-picked successor, Judge Harry T. Dewhirst. 217 members left the House of David to join Mary's faction, including most of the farm workers and baseball players. About the same number remained at the original colony, including most of the colony's musicians, the majority of employees of Eden Springs Park, and accounting and office personnel. Mary’s followers relocated from the colony grounds to a nearby lot where only one structure stood, establishing Mary's City of David commune there.

=== Business Ventures ===
Despite a decade of scandals and the death of its leader, the House of David thrived after 1930 thanks to its many successful business ventures. In addition to operating a number of farms that took advantage of the features that made Southwest Michigan a significant grower of fruit, the House of David also operated greenhouses, a packaged food processing plant, a cold storage plant, and owned automobile dealerships, numerous motels, and they continued to operate Eden Springs Park, which was later renamed to House of David Park.

Mary’s City of David was not as financially successful as the House of David during these years, yet the rival colony nonetheless stabilized during the 1930s and formed enterprises of their own to support their operations. They built Paradise Park, a vacation resort for Orthodox Jews, eventually leading them to construct a synagogue on the grounds. The colony also opened “Mary’s Hotel” in downtown Benton Harbor which featured Mary’s Bakery and Mary’s Vegetarian Cafe, one of two vegetarian restaurants run by Mary's City of David.

=== Decline ===
Both colonies declined in the second half of the twentieth century. Judge Dewhirst, leader of the House of David, died in 1947. Mary died in 1953 and was laid to rest in a mausoleum on the colony grounds. Following the deaths of many of their aging members and the subsequent economic decline of Benton Harbor, membership shrank dramatically, neglected buildings fell into disrepair (a few burned, others had to be torn down), and many of the businesses owned by the House of David and City of David began shutting down. House of David Park, the cold storage plant, and Mary's Hotel were among the few that lasted into the 1970s.

In 1990, there were twenty-one members of the House of David and eighteen members of Mary’s City of David. Between the two, eighteen of the members had joined when Benjamin was still alive.

=== Present ===
Today, the House of David is governed by a board trustees. At their headquarters in Shiloh House, the trustees along with the colony’s archival staff work to collect, organize, and preserve a vast collection of House of David historical documents, records, and artifacts. Other collections of House of David archival material are preserved in the Special Collections at the Hamilton College Library in Clinton, New York, and at the Bentley Historical Library at the University of Michigan. The House of David has plans for a museum, research library, and event space on the colony grounds. An offsite museum relocated from nearby St. Joseph to nearby Royalton Township in 2026.

The City of David has one remaining member. The colony’s former auditorium was converted into a museum for displaying artifacts and memorabilia, and, until 2023, it was open to visitors who could tour various colony buildings including a synagogue, carpentry shop, greenhouse, and living quarters.

== Theology ==
The theology of The House of David is based on the Christian Israelite faith first established by Joanna Southcott in 18th-century England and is laid out in the 780-page Star of Bethlehem: The Living Roll of Life written by Benjamin and Mary Purnell and published in 1902. Benjamin and Mary jointly claimed to be the seventh and final messenger named in the Book of Revelation. The first six messengers in the Christian Israelite tradition are Southcott followed by Richard Brothers, George Turner, William Shaw, John Wroe, and James Jezreel. Using passages from the books of Genesis and Revelation, the Apocrypha, and the teachings of Southcott and her successors, Benjamin Purnell asserted that the gathering together of the 144,000 scattered Israelites (alleged to be the descendants of the mythical "Ten Lost Tribes" of Israel) would bring about the millennium where Christ would return to Earth and grant those 144,000 immortality of the body and soul. Those seeking to join the ingathering of the Israelites at the House of David were required to abstain from sex, renounce violence and war, reject the ownership of private property, and not eat meat, drink alcohol, cut their hair, or handle the dead.

== Baseball and basketball teams ==
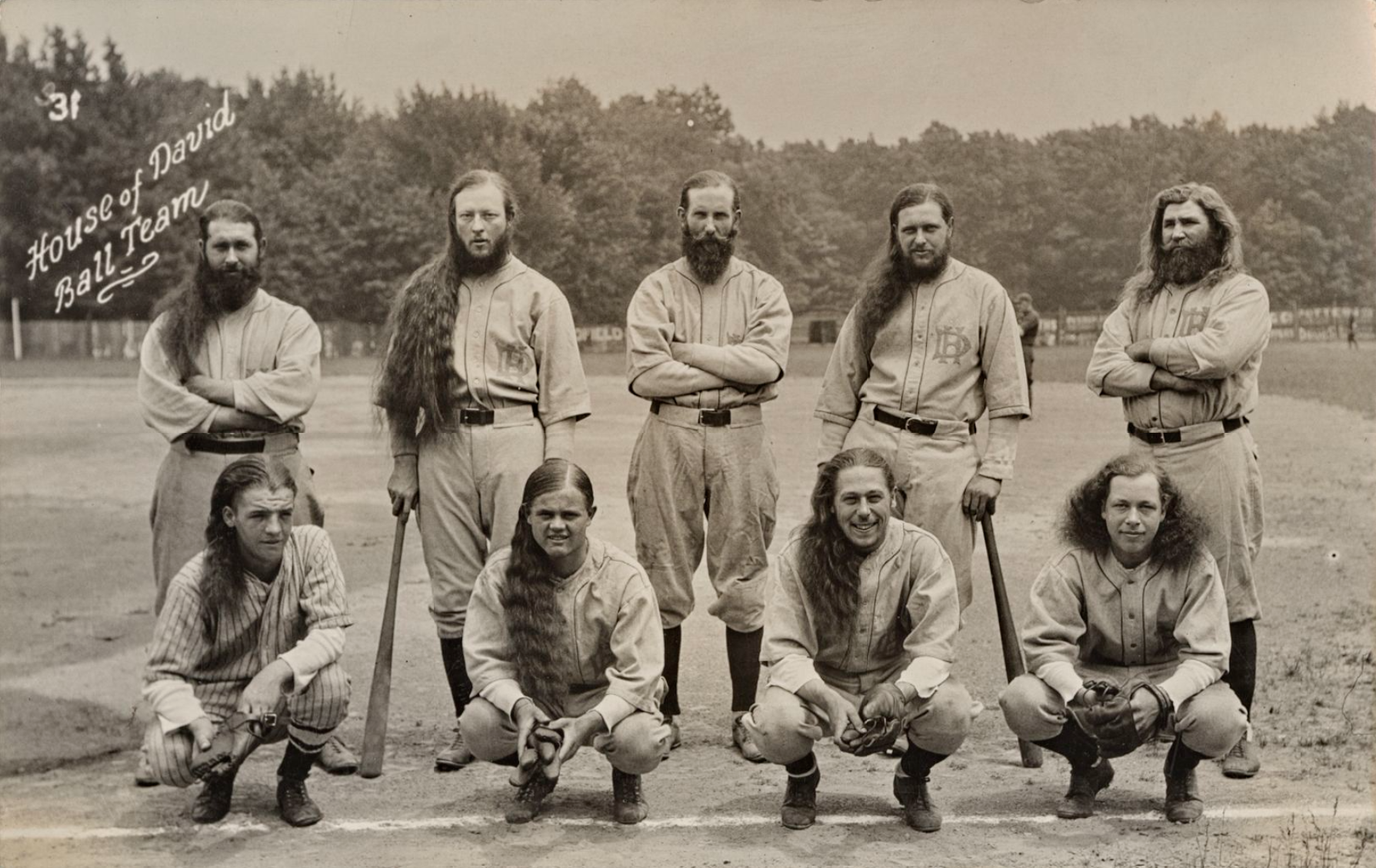
A House of David baseball team, 1927

The House of David first fielded an organized baseball team in 1914, first as a recreational activity for the men and women of the colony, but quickly developing it into a professional squad. Growing in skill and popularity, by 1917 the colony fielded a semi-pro exhibition team that toured the country. The traveling team played up to 200 games a year against local, semi-pro, minor-league, and major-league teams. Starting in the late 1920s, multiple unlicensed imitation or knockoff House of David teams popped up using the House of David name and likeness, which included teams from Florida, California, New Mexico, and even an African American team playing in the Negro leagues.

When the commune split in 1930, both sides fielded their own baseball teams. Between the two factions of the House of David, at least six official teams were playing under the House of David name in the 1930s. Having expanded beyond a roster exclusively of House of David members, famous players such as Satchel Paige, Bill Perkins, Grover Cleveland Alexander, Babe Didrikson Zaharias, Charles Albert "Chief" Bender, and Jackie Mitchell suited up for House of David teams at different times. The teams continued to be praised for their skill, receiving invitations to play in tournaments across the country. The original House of David no longer had a traveling team after 1936, instead fielding local teams off and on during the 1940s. However, traveling teams from Mary’s City of David continued touring under the House of David name up through 1956.

House of David baseball teams were featured in Ken Burns' documentary miniseries Baseball as well as the 1952 film The Winning Team, which depicts Ronald Reagan as Grover Cleveland Alexander playing for the House of David later in his career. Two novels, The Golem's Mighty Swing by James Sturm and The House of Daniel by Harry Turtledove, were inspired by House of David baseball teams. The National Baseball Hall of Fame and Museum holds several artifacts related to the House of David.

The House of David and Mary’s City of David also formed professional basketball teams that travelled across the country and internationally. Following the trend of barnstorming teams that used their novelty appearance or comedic gags to attract audiences, the House of David teams, sometimes using the name "Bearded Aces," competed from 1929 through 1957. As with baseball, more than a dozen knockoff unlicensed House of David basketball teams took to the road in the 1930s and 1940s, hoping to capitalize on and profit illegally from the renowned House of David name. Mary’s City of David’s basketball team, which played under the House of David name, was by far the most famous of the numerous official and unofficial traveling House of David basketball teams. They toured frequently with the Harlem Globetrotters in the 1940s and 1950s, and accompanied the Globetrotters on their first European tour in 1954.

== Music ==
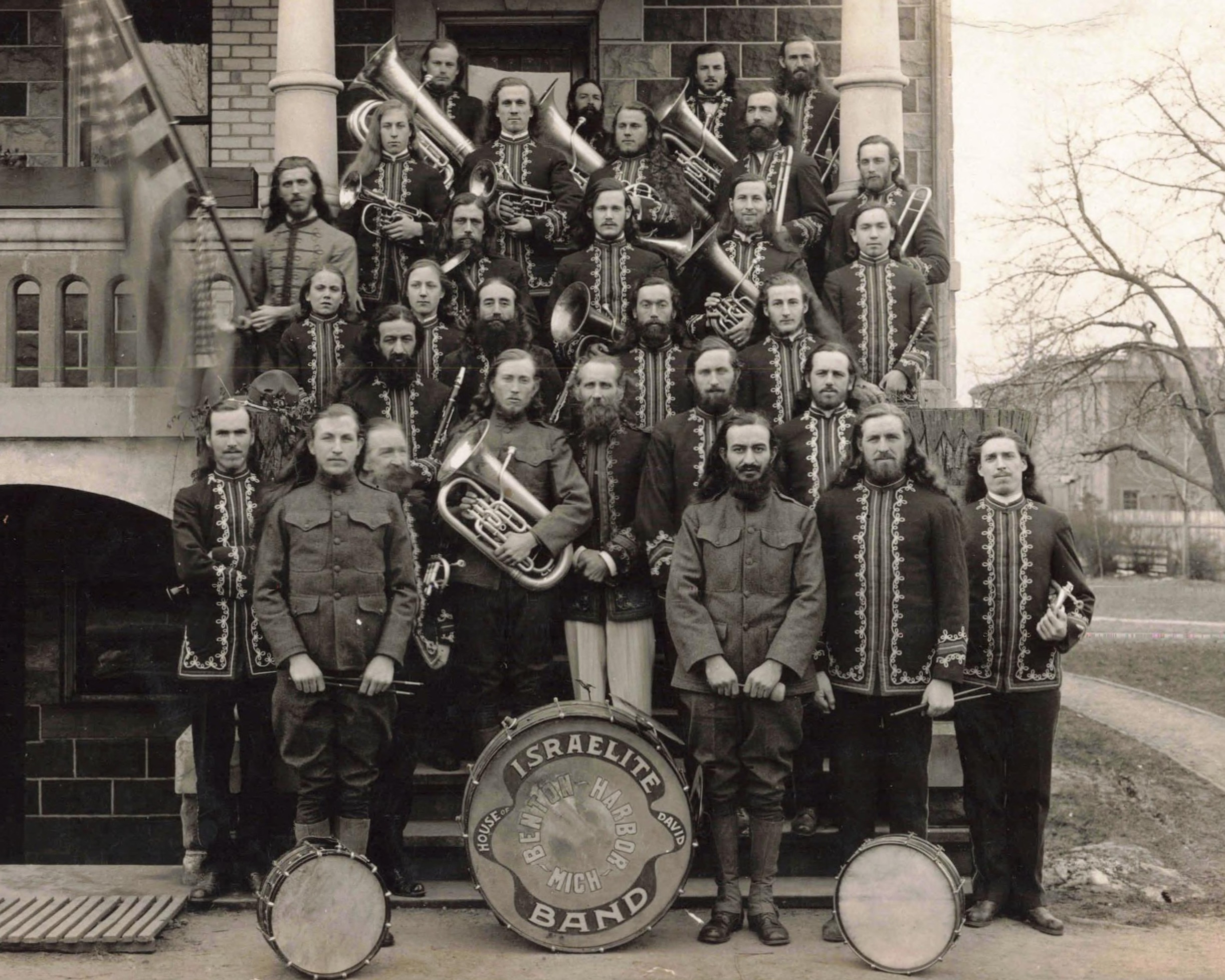
The House of David Band, 1910s

For much of its history, music was at the center of life at the House of David. Beginning in 1905, the House of David had bands, a music school, and an instrument-making shop. Nearly every member of the colony was involved in music in some way, and members formed multiple groups of varying styles over the years. They had separate men’s, women’s, and children’s marching bands, string ensembles, vocal trios, quartets, and groups focused around specific styles or instruments, such as country fiddle, Irish folk, mandolin, and ukulele. While some of the groups only played at House of David Park in Benton Harbor, their marching bands and later their jazz and swing bands were touring acts.

The twenty-piece marching band was the first of the House of David bands to go on tour, however, as jazz rose in popularity in the late 1910s and early 1920s, the touring band paired down to a ten-piece jazz ensemble called variously The Original House of David Band, the House of David Jazz Orchestra, and the House of David Singing Band. Members formed two more jazz bands, the Syncopep Serenaders and The House of David Ladies Band, which also toured in the 1920s. The Jazz band was signed by Columbia Records who booked them for tours and radio broadcasts, but there is no evidence they ever made any recordings.

Years of scandals and division within the colony led to many of the musicians leaving in the late 1920s. This prompted House of David member Clarence “Chic” Bell to form a new group, The House of David Orchestra, comprised partly of members and partly by hired non-member professional musicians. Chic's orchestra played in Eden Springs Park alongside the Ladies Orchestra and toured occasionally from the 1930s to the 1950s. The last band associated with the House of David was led by Chic in the early 1960s, but was made up of all non-members.

During the 1920s, several artists recorded versions of a song titled "The House of David Blues." Sheet music for the song by Elmer Schoebel, Billy Meyers, and Irving Mills was published by Mills Music, Inc.

== Eden Springs Park ==
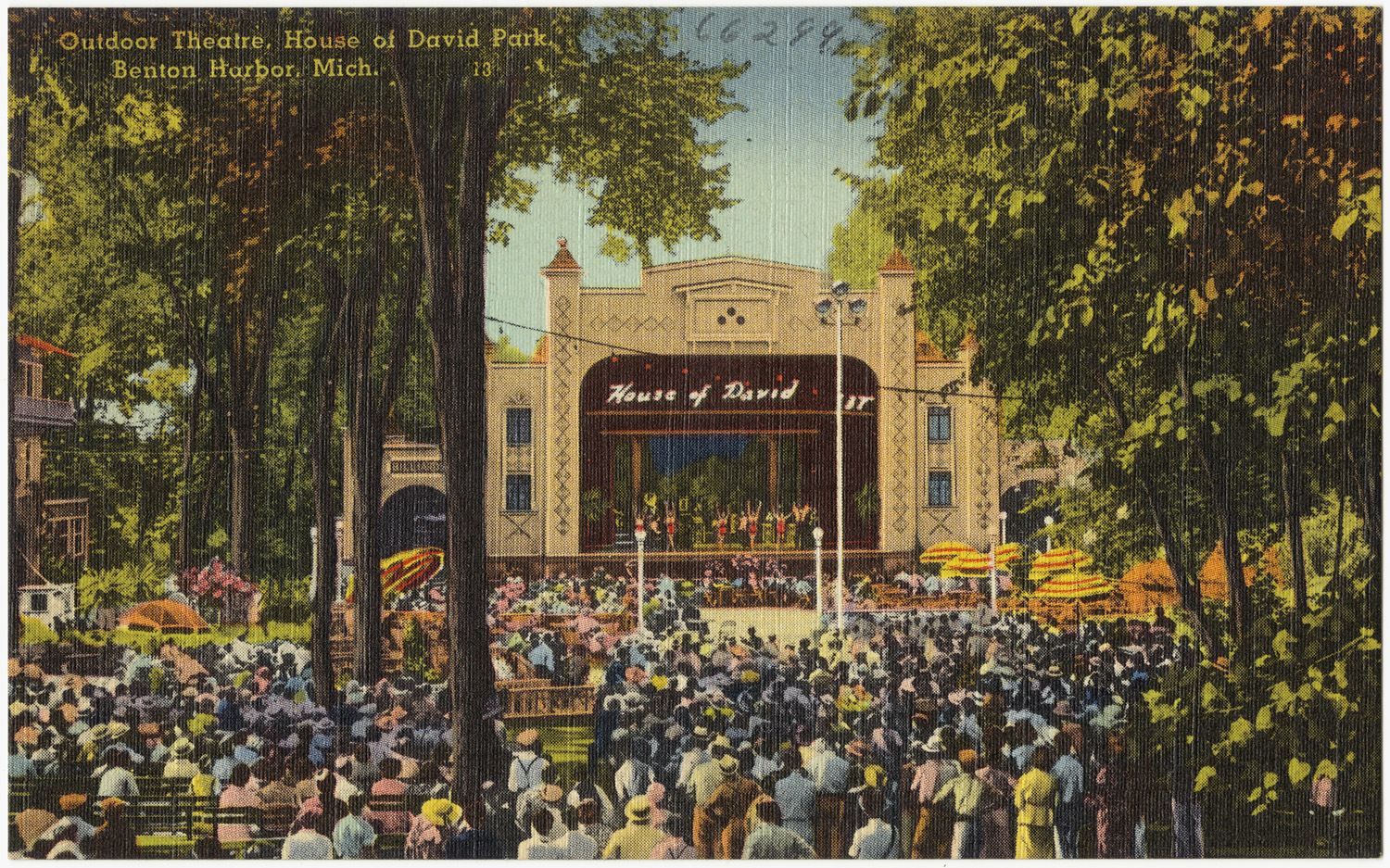
A stage at Eden Springs Park

In 1908, the House of David opened an amusement park called Eden Springs Park, later renamed to House of David Park, just east of the colony grounds. The park, which sat on 125 acres, primarily catered to middle-class visitors from Chicago and included a restaurant, ice cream parlor, movies, zoo and aviary, bowling alley, swimming pool, hotel, baseball stadium, and miniature trains that transported visitors throughout the park. They hosted visiting bands and touring vaudeville acts in addition to the musical groups formed by the House of David. The park was likely based on the fairgrounds where Benjamin and Mary frequently held religious meetings before settling in Benton Harbor. By 1914, the colony claimed Eden Springs Park to have over 300,000 visitors per summer. The park operated into the early 1970s.

In 2009, the non-profit organization Eden Springs Park acquired the park property from the Israelite House of David. It later reopened the park in a limited capacity, mainly period miniature train rides and various small events. The park was listed on the National Register of Historic Places in 2023.
