= Purnell =

Purnell is a name shared by:

== People ==
- Alton Purnell (1911–1987), American pianist
- Arthur Purnell (1878–1964), architect in Melbourne, Victoria
- Benjamin Franklin Purnell (1861–1927), American preacher, House of David (commune)
- Bervin E. Purnell (1891–1972), Australian politician
- Charles Purnell (1843–1926), New Zealand soldier, journalist, lawyer, and writer
- Clyde Purnell (1877–1934), British football player
- Desmond Purnell (born 2003), American football player
- Ella Purnell (born 1996), British actress
- Fred S. Purnell (1882–1939), American politician
- Glynn Purnell (born 1975), English chef and restaurateur
- Heather Purnell (born 1986), Canadian gymnast
- Idella Purnell (1901–1982), American author and librarian
- James Purnell (born 1970), British politician
- Jesse Purnell (1881–1966), American baseball player
- Jim Purnell (1941–2003), American football player
- John Purnell, English academic administrator
- John Howard Purnell (1925–1996), Welsh chemist
- Jon Purnell, US diplomat, ambassador to Uzbekistan
- Keg Purnell (1915–1965), American drummer
- Louis Purnell (1920–2001), American curator and Tuskegee airman
- Lovett Purnell (born 1972), American football player
- Mark Purnell, British palaeontologist
- Marshall Purnell (born 1950), American architect
- Mary Stallard Purnell (1862–1953), American religious leader and writer
- Phil Purnell (born 1964), British football player
- Oliver Purnell (born 1953), American basketball coach
- Russ Purnell (born 1948), American football coach
- Sonia Purnell, British writer and journalist
- Thomas Richard Purnell (1847–1908), American judge
- Tony Purnell (born 1958), English businessman
- William Henry Purnell (1826–1902), American politician
- Winifred Purnell (born 1893), Australian-born pianist in England.
- Zedekiah Johnson Purnell (1813–1882), African-American activist and businessman

== Places ==
- Purnell, Baltimore, Maryland, United States, a neighborhood
- George Washington Purnell House
- Purnell House (disambiguation)

== Organizations ==
- Julia A. Purnell Museum
- Purnell and Sons, defunct British printing company
- Purnell School, a girls' school in New Jersey
- Purnell (company), Swiss watch manufacturer

== Science ==
- Purnell equation in chemistry

== See also ==
- Parnell
