= Parnell (surname) =

Parnell is a surname. Notable people with the surname include:

- Anna Catherine Parnell (1852–1911), Irish nationalist
- Archie Parnell, American political candidate
- Arthur Parnell (1861–1935), British Anglican priest
- Arthur Horatio Parnell (1852–1933), English-born Australian politician
- Babe Parnell (1901–1982), American National Football League player
- Bill Parnell (1928–2008), Canadian middle distance runner
- Bobby Parnell (born 1984), American Major League Baseball pitcher
- Bonnie Parnell (born 1946), American politician
- Buster Parnell (c. 1934–2017), Irish jockey
- Charles Stewart Parnell (1846–1891), Irish politician, leader of the Irish Parliamentary Party
- Charles Parnell (actor), American actor
- Chris Parnell (born 1967), American actor and comedian
- Clare Parnell (born 1970), British astrophysicist and applied mathematician
- Edward Parnell (1859–1922), Mayor of Winnipeg, Canada
- Evelyn Parnell (1888–1939), American operatic soprano
- Edward Parnell (1875–1941), British Olympic sport shooter
- Emory Parnell (1892–1979), American vaudevillian and actor
- Fanny Parnell (1848-1882), Irish poet and nationalist
- Frank Parnell (born 1935), English footballer
- Fred Parnell (1883–1960), English footballer
- Frederick Raymond Parnell (1868–1951), Canadian politician and businessman
- Harvey Parnell (1880–1936), American politician, governor of Arkansas
- Henry Parnell, 1st Baron Congleton (1776–1842), Irish writer and politician
- Henry Parnell, 5th Baron Congleton (1890–1914), Anglo-Irish soldier and aristocrat
- Hester Parnall (1868–1939), English brewer and businesswoman
- Jack Parnell (1923–2010), English musician and musical director
- Jermey Parnell (born 1986), American former National Football League player
- John Parnell (disambiguation)
- Justin Parnell (born 1988), American college basketball head coach
- Kenneth Parnell (1931–2008), American convicted sex offender, child rapist, and kidnapper
- Lee Roy Parnell (born 1956), American country music and blues artist
- Mandy Parnell, British audio mastering engineer
- Marc Parnell, American ornithologist, author and wildlife photographer
- Mark Parnell (born 1959), Australian politician
- Mel Parnell (1922–2012), American Major League Baseball pitcher
- Nancy Stewart Parnell (1901–1975), British politician and trade unionist
- Patrick Parnell (born 2002), former Australian rules footballer
- Peter Parnell (born 1953), American playwright
- Red Parnell (1903–1954), American Negro league baseball player and manager
- Reg Parnell (1911–1964), English racing driver and team manager
- Richard Parnell (1810–1882), British physician and naturalist
- Roy Parnell (1943–2025), English footballer
- Samuel Duncan Parnell (1810–1890), New Zealand settler often credited with the establishment of the eight-hour day in New Zealand
- Sean Parnell (born 1962), American politician, former governor of Alaska
- Sean Parnell, Pentagon spokesperson under the second Trump administration
- Stewart Parnell, owner of Peanut Corporation of America, imprisoned for shipping contaminated food
- Thomas Parnell (1679–1718), Anglo-Irish poet and clergyman
- Thomas Parnell (1881–1948), English-Australian physicist
- Thomas Frederick Parnell, birth name of Fred Russell (1862–1957), English ventriloquist
- Tim Parnell (1932–2017), British racing driver and team manager
- Val Parnell (1892–1972), British television managing director and theatrical impresario
- Wayne Parnell (born 1989), South African cricketer
- William Parnell (disambiguation)

== See also ==
- Governor Parnell (disambiguation)
- Senator Parnell (disambiguation)
- Pernell (disambiguation), including a list of people with the surname
