= Mary Stallard Purnell =

American religious leader and writer (1862–1953)

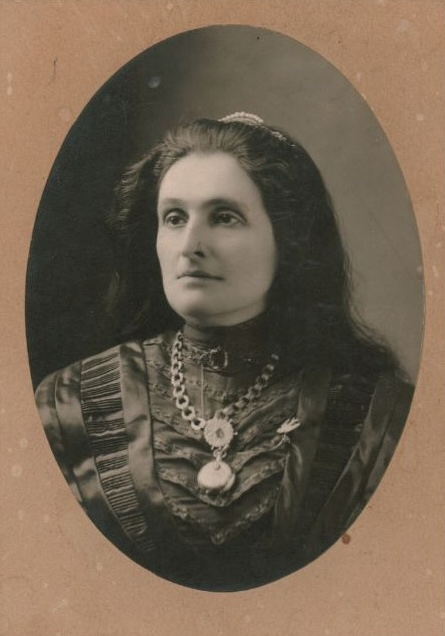
- Purnell, c. 1904
- Born: Mary Stallard; November 13, 1862; Nickelsville, Virginia, United States
- Died: August 19, 1953 (aged 90); Benton Harbor, Michigan, U.S.
- Resting place: City of David grounds, Benton Harbor, Michigan
- Other names: Queen Mary
- Occupations: Religious leader; writer
- Known for: Co-founding the Israelite House of David; Founding Mary's City of David
- Spouse: Benjamin Purnell (m. 1880; died 1927)
- Children: 2

Mary Stallard Purnell (born Mary Stallard; November 13, 1862 – August 19, 1953), sometimes called Queen Mary, was an American religious leader and writer. With her husband, Benjamin Purnell, she co-founded the Israelite House of David, a Christian Israelite communal sect established in the early 20th century. The community, based in Benton Harbor, Michigan, practised communal living, vegetarianism, celibacy, and distinctive grooming and dress customs. After Benjamin's death and a leadership dispute within the colony, Purnell founded a separate community, Mary's City of David. The new colony operated a vegetarian hotel and restaurant and became a religious community and vacation resort during the Great Depression. Purnell led the community until her death in 1953.

== Biography ==
=== Early and personal life ===
Mary Stallard was born on November 13, 1862, near Nickelsville, Virginia, to James Alderman and Winnie Davis Stallard. Her father, a conscientious objector during the American Civil War, fled to neutral Kentucky when she was three months old and later brought his wife and children to join him.

In August 1880, she married Benjamin Purnell, a Kentucky broom-maker, in Aberdeen, Ohio. He had previously been married, had a daughter from that marriage, and had filed for divorce, though the proceedings were not completed.

Their son Coy was born in 1881. He traveled with his parents during their early preaching work but did not become a member of their religious colony. According to later accounts, he left home at age 12 to serve as a bugler in a Kentucky regiment and later worked as a mining prospector, traveling in the United States and Australia. He died in 1924. Their daughter, Hettie, born in 1887, left home at 16 and was employed at a store in Fostoria, Ohio, where she died in a shop explosion.

In the late 1880s, Mary and Benjamin worked as itinerant laborers before turning to preaching. They settled briefly in Richmond, Indiana, where they encountered followers of James Jershom Jezreel. In 1892, they moved to Detroit to join a Jezreelite colony led by Michael Mills. The community dissolved a few years later after Mills was convicted of statutory rape in 1894.

=== Israelite House of David ===
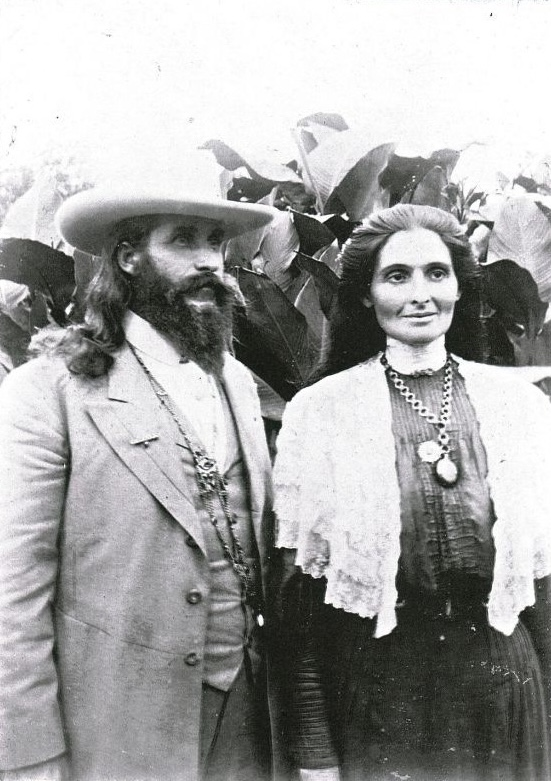
The Purnells during the early years of the Israelite House of David colony, c. 1909

In 1902, Mary and Benjamin began publishing The Star of Bethlehem in Fostoria, Ohio, and formally established the Israelite House of David. They claimed to have received a divine calling, called the "Visitation" or "spiritual graft", while affiliated with a Jezreelite group in Detroit. They presented themselves as the Seventh and Final Messenger in a prophetic tradition associated with 18th- and 19th-century British religious figures including Richard Brothers and Joanna Southcott, and sought to unite Christian Israelite groups, including followers of John Wroe and James Jezreel.

The Purnells settled in Benton Harbor, Michigan, on March 17, 1903, acquiring land with help from local Jezreelites. After incorporating the Israelite House of David as a religious body on June 4, they began missionary work and distributed their publication to attract members.

The colony grew during the following years. In 1904, Mary accompanied Benjamin to Australia. In March 1905, 85 Wroeite members from Australia arrived in Benton Harbor, where they made a public impression with a brass band procession and brought skills used in the colony. In 1908, the community opened Eden Springs Park, which had miniature trains, live entertainment, and a small zoo. The group also formed baseball teams that became known for their appearance and play on the barnstorming circuit. Music was part of community life, with bands and choirs performing locally and a jazz group touring nationally in the late 1920s. The colony's economy was based on agriculture and was supplemented by logging, transport, and businesses in Benton Harbor, including a hotel, trolley line, and cold storage. By 1916, membership had grown to about 1,000.

The community's religious practices included preaching, prayer, scripture study, and reflection. The group did not build churches or hold traditional services, and did not observe a fixed Sabbath, instead treating every day as sacred. Influenced by early Christian models, members lived communally, followed a vegetarian diet, and valued bodily purity. Mary described vegetarianism in religious terms, writing in a letter:

Israel are VEGETARIANS from the standpoint of not killing any of God's creatures, even to satisfy appetites and lusts. Be ye clean that bear the vessels of the Lord. Israel shall measure up to that command, and 'present their bodies a living sacrifice'; Thou shalt not kill. The diet in Eden was a vegetarian diet.

Celibacy was practised, although marriage was allowed. Men kept long hair and beards. Modest dress was expected, and women typically avoided makeup and wore their hair long.

The House of David was the subject of controversy, especially over allegations of sexual misconduct by Benjamin. Complaints emerged as early as 1907, often in connection with financial disputes. They intensified in the 1920s, when two trials received press coverage. Purnell was accused of rape and coercion, but no criminal trial took place, and some witnesses later recanted. In 1927, the group was found guilty of religious fraud in a civil case, though the verdict was later overturned. Press coverage, including claims that the group was a "sex cult", affected the colony's public image.

=== Mary's City of David ===
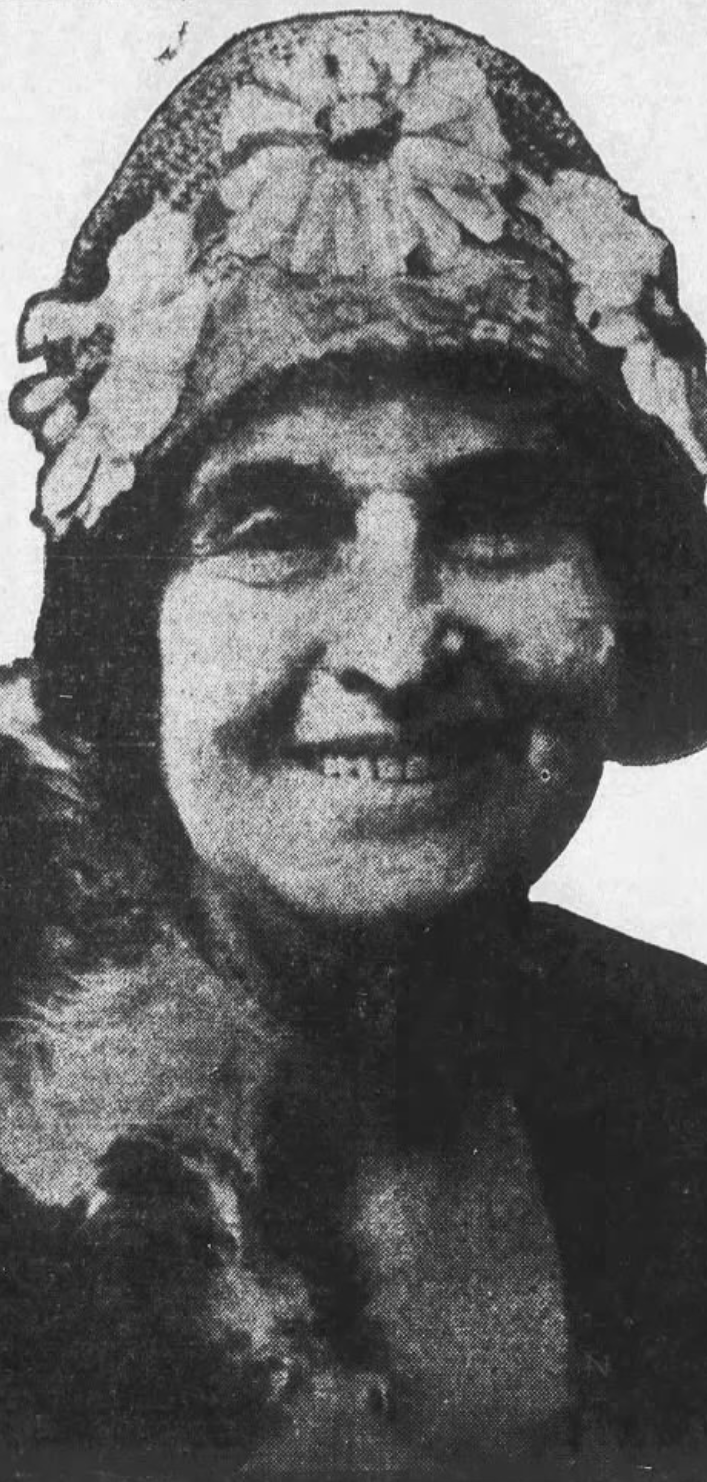
Purnell, c. 1928

After Benjamin's death in 1927, legal disputes and leadership conflicts divided the colony. In 1930, a rift between Mary and Judge H. T. Dewhirst led to a formal split in the Israelite House of David, with Mary leading 217 followers to establish a new colony, later named the City of David, across from the original site. During the Great Depression, Mary's community built cottages using reclaimed materials, migrant labor, and volunteer work. Architect Frank Baushke designed the cottages in a simpler style than the buildings of the original colony. Mary regarded the separation as a spiritual purification and rejected what she saw as the original colony's material excesses and moral compromise. The City of David also developed as a Jewish vacation resort.

By 1934, the City of David operated two vegetarian restaurants, one in Mary's Hotel and another at Paradise Park. The restaurants served residents and visitors, using produce grown and processed by the community. The vegetarian food also appealed to Jewish guests observing kosher dietary laws, including visitors from Chicago and Europe during the rise of antisemitism in the 1930s. Seventh-day Adventist visitors also ate at the restaurants.

The colony later declined because of economic changes and a falling membership associated with its celibate practices. Mary, who was known to followers as "Queen Mary", remained the spiritual leader of the City of David until her death.

=== Death ===
Mary died on August 19, 1953, at age 90 in her apartment at Mary's Shiloh in Benton Harbor. Her death was kept private for two days. She was first interred at Crystal Springs Cemetery, and her remains were reburied in January 1954 at the City of David grounds, in a mausoleum on the east lawn of the colony headquarters.

== Selected publications ==
- The Comforter: Brief Discourses by Mary (Benton Harbor, MI: Israelite House of David, c. 1925)
- A Letter from Home: To One Who Wanted a Special Letter from Sister Mary, Not a Form Letter (Benton Harbor, MI: Israelite House of David as Re-organized by Mary Purnell, c. 1930s)
- Mary and Benjamin's Travels (Benton Harbor, MI: Israelite House of David as Re-organized by Mary Purnell, 1931)

== See also ==
- Christian vegetarianism
- Women and vegetarianism and veganism advocacy
