= Parnell Township =

Parnell Township may refer to the following townships in the United States:

- Parnell Township, Sheridan County, Kansas
- Parnell Township, Polk County, Minnesota
- Parnell Township, Traverse County, Minnesota
