= Parnell Township, Minnesota =

Parnell Township is the name of some places in the U.S. state of Minnesota:

- Parnell Township, Polk County, Minnesota
- Parnell Township, Traverse County, Minnesota
