= Purnell House =

Purnell House may refer to:

- George Washington Purnell House, Snow Hill, Maryland, listed on the U.S. National Register of Historic Places (NRHP)
- James C. Purnell House, Winona, Mississippi, NRHP-listed
- Purnell House (Goshen, New Hampshire), listed on the U.S. National Register of Historic Places (NRHP)

== See also ==
- Purnell (disambiguation)
