= Wakemanites =

Former cult group in New Heaven

Wakemanites were a religious group in New Haven, Connecticut led by Rhoda Wakeman, who identified as a prophetess returned from the dead. Originating around 1855, the followers killed a farmer named Justus Matthews who they were told was possessed. After the murder, the group became extinct. The New York Times interviewed the "convinced parties" in the wake of the murder.

== Founding ==
The Wakemanites were first founded on January 26, 1855 in New Haven, Connecticut by Rhoda Wakeman (née Sly). Rhoda was born in 1786 in Huntington, Connecticut and married her husband Ira Wakeman around the turn of the century. Ira was abusive and frequently threatened to kill Rhoda; after a particularly bad fight, Wakeman believed she was murdered by her husband around 1825.

Wakeman would frequently recount the story of her resurrection during sermons. In the story, her husband Ira killed her and she had remained dead for seven hours. During this time, her spirit was escorted by angels to meet Jesus Christ. She was then resurrected by God in order to spread wisdom among mankind. Wakeman was paranoid that the antichrist was trying to murder her in her new role.

In the 1830s, Wakeman began to call herself "the Prophetess". A rumor surfaced that she had killed her husband, after his death in 1833. Wakeman and her brother Samuel Sly made a living from selling elixirs outside New Haven's Grove Street Cemetery and from Wakeman's weaving.

== Practices and beliefs ==
Wakemanites believed their founder Rhoda to be immortal; should she die, the end of the world would also occur.

Samuel Sly served as high priest of the Wakemanites. He held religious services in his home. Religious services would take place on the Sabbath, when followers would come together for prayer, singing, and a sermon from Wakeman.

== Murder of Justus Matthews ==
After her husband died in 1833, Wakeman believed that the demon that had been living in his body had transferred to her son-in-law Eben Gould. Gould never attempted to murder Wakeman.

In 1855, Wakeman believed that the demon had moved on to the body of Amos Hunt. Hunt was a Wakemanite himself. In November 1855, Hunt purportedly attempted to poison Wakeman. Sources disagree on why; some claim he wanted to test her immortality, some claim there was never poison at all. Hunt gave Wakeman an arsenic-laced cake that caused her some non-fatal discomfort. Wakeman ordered Sly to bring the cake to Yale for analysis by chemist Benjamin Silliman. She disregarded any results and instead claimed that witchcraft must have been involved. Amos Hunt later sued the Wakemanites.

After Hunt, the demon moved into the body of Justus W. Matthews, a 35-year-old mechanic who worked at the Whitneyville Pistol Factory. He lived in Hamden with his wife and four children. Matthews was a member of the Wakemanites; reportedly, he borrowed $200 so he could tithe Wakeman. After his attendance at Wakemanite religious services waned, Rhoda viewed this inaction as a sign that Matthews was now possessed by the devil, not Hunt. Wakeman claimed that Matthews was causing her declining health.

After Matthews had "caught" the demon, stories of his possession began to arise. One Wakemanite member claimed that after arriving home, Matthews' wife began to convulse. Matthews volunteered for an exorcism to remove the demon from his body. On December 23, 1855, during a full moon, the Wakemanites met to expel the demon from Matthews. The exorcism did not work; Matthew was subsequently murdered by the Wakemanites and Sly. He was 50 years old.

Matthews' body was found the next day. The group were arrested and sent to New Haven County Jail. They expressed no remorse, believing Matthews to be possessed by the devil. Sly was sentenced to prison.

On New Year's Day 1856, a Wakemanite follower named Charles Sanford decapitated two men. He died later from fever.

By 1856, the Wakemanites had completely dissolved. For nearly a century afterwards, "Wakemanites" was used in American English to refer to religious zealots.

On January 21, 1856, the Christian Israelite Church denounced the Wakemanites and claimed they had never heard of the sect before the murder of Matthews. This was following a statement made by Sly connecting the two groups.
