= John Parnell =

John Parnell may refer to:

- John Parnell (1680–1727), Irish MP for Granard 1713–22
- Sir John Parnell, 1st Baronet (c. 1720–1782), Irish M.P. for Maryborough
- Sir John Parnell, 2nd Baronet (1744–1801), Irish M.P. for Queen's County 1783–1801
- John Parnell, 2nd Baron Congleton (1805–1883), British missionary in Turkey and India
- John Parnell (1811–1859), Irish-born English cricketer with amateur status
- John Howard Parnell (1843–1923), Parnellite Nationalist MP for South Meath
- Jack Parnell (John Russell Parnell, 1923–2010), English bandleader and musician
- John A. Parnell (born 1964), professor of management at the University of North Carolina, Pembroke
