= James Jezreel =

James Jezreel, born James Rowland White (c. 1851 – 2 March 1885), was a nineteenth-century soldier and self-proclaimed prophet.

== Life ==
Jezreel started off as a follower of John Wroe signing as a member of the Christian Israelite Church at Chatham, Kent on 15 October 1875. In the 1880s, White chose the name 'James Jershom Jezreel' as he became convinced that he was a prophet. His followers, known as the Jezreelites, were mainly concentrated in Kent and the south-east of England. A temple was built, Jezreel's Tower, in Gillingham, Kent.
