= Parnell (given name) =

Parnell is a masculine given name borne by:

== People ==
- Parnell Bradbury (1904–1977), British writer, playwright and theatre critic
- Parnell Dickinson (born 1953), American former National Football League quarterback
- Parnell Gourlay (1879–1958), Canadian amateur soccer player on the 1904 Olympic champion team
- Parnell Hall (writer) (1944–2020), American mystery writer
- Parnell Motley (born 1997), American football player
- Parnell William Terry, American politician elected to the Maine House of Representatives in 2024
- J. Parnell Thomas (1895–1970), American politician and stockbroker
- Parnell Woods (1912–1977), American Negro league baseball player

== Fictional characters ==
- Parnell Jacobs, a character associated with the Marvel Comics superhero War Machine

== See also ==
- Pernell (disambiguation), including a list of people with the given name
