= Shiloh House (Benton Harbor, Michigan) =

Historic house in Michigan, United States

- U.S. National Register of Historic Places
- Michigan State Historic Site
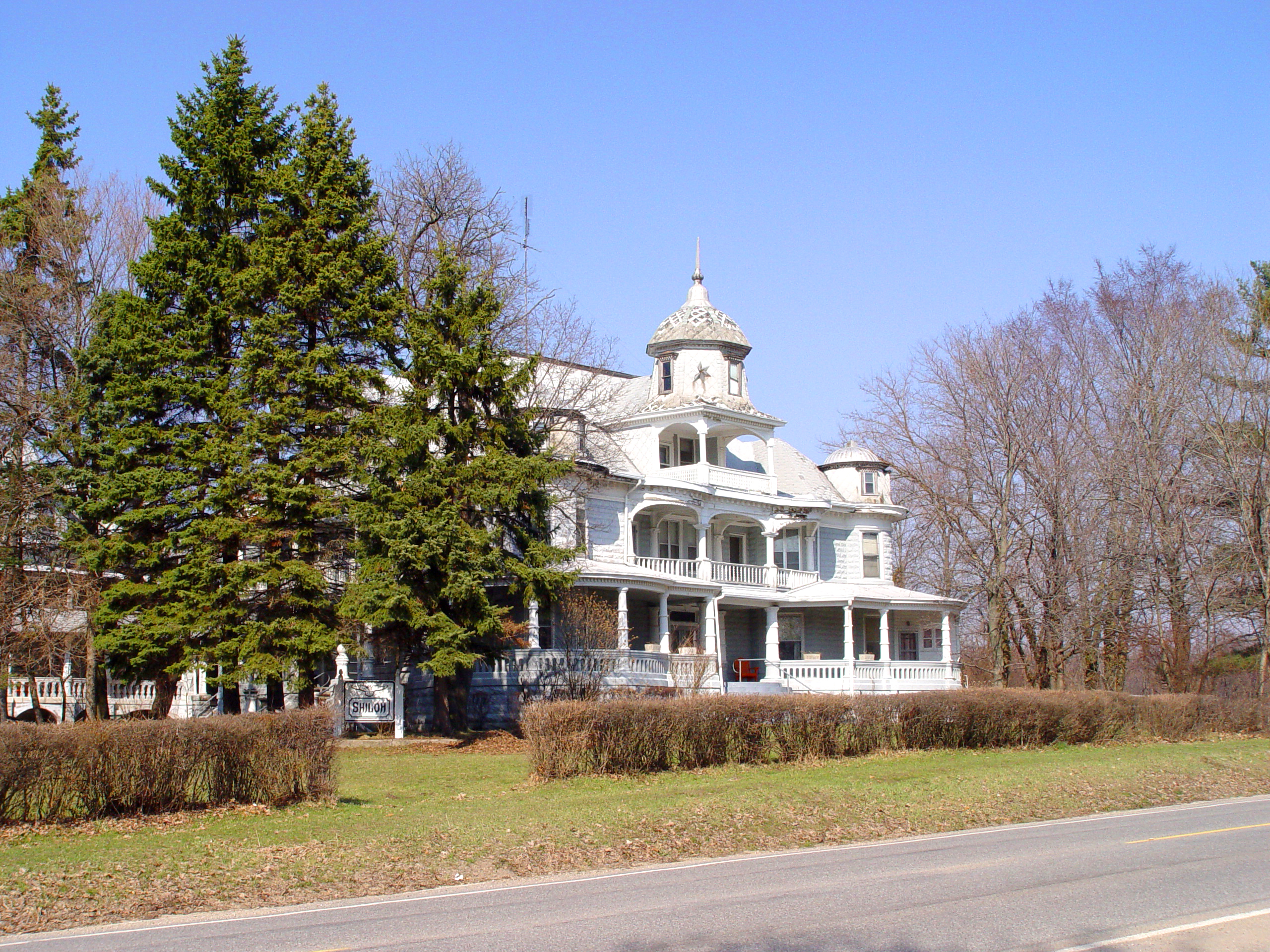

- Location within Michigan Location within the United States
- Interactive map
- Location: 1055 E. Britain Rd., Benton Harbor, Michigan
- Coordinates: 42°6′30″N 86°25′57″W
- Architect: House of David Colony
- Architectural style: Queen Anne
- NRHP reference No.: 72000594

Significant dates
- Added to NRHP: September 29, 1972
- Designated MSHS: December 10, 1971

Shiloh House in Benton Harbor, Michigan was built in Queen Anne style by the House of David Colony. It was built in 1910 and listed on the National Register of Historic Places in 1972.

== History ==
The House of David was founded in 1903 by Benjamin Purnell. Believers came to this site in Benton Harbor to join the commune. To accommodate the growing number of converts, a number of buildings were erected around this site. One of the members of the commune built a machine to construct cement blocks, which were then used to construct the buildings. Shiloh House, constructed in 1910, was the first building to use blocks from the commune itself.

Reportedly, Purnell's favorite girls were kept in this building, until the details were revealed in the 1920s. Afterward, it has been used for office and dormitory space.

== Description ==
Shiloh House is a 2 1/2-story Queen Anne building constructed of cement blocks. It is composed of a main section in the front and two equally sized sections to the rear, connected to the main section with covered archways. It has a hip roof, round turrets, and a center porch able topped with a dome and finial. Balconies on the second and third floor have curved archways between the columns and decorative wooden railings.
