= John A. Parnell =

American academic

John A. Parnell (born November 20, 1964) is a professor of Management and Eminent Scholar in Business at the University of North Alabama. He held the William Henry Belk Chair of Management at the University of North Carolina, Pembroke from 2002 to 2019, where he also served as Interim Dean at the UNCP School of Business during the 2014–2015 academic year.

== Early life and education ==
Born in Greenville, North Carolina, Parnell earned the BSBA (Marketing), MBA, and MA (Adult Education) degrees from East Carolina University, the Doctor of Education degree from Campbell University, and the Doctor of Philosophy degree in Strategic Management from the University of Memphis.

== Career ==
Parnell owned and operated a small consumer electronics direct mail firm before pursuing a career in the academe. He received the 2002 H.M. Lafferty Distinguished Faculty Award at Texas A&M University–Commerce, the 2005 Adolph Dial Award for Scholarly & Creative Activity at UNC-Pembroke, the Peter Vaill Award for Service in 2006 and 2016, and the 2011 Spirit of Inquiry Award from the James G. Martin Center for Academic Renewal.

Parnell is the author of over 200 basic and applied research articles and published presentations. He is known for his work in competitive strategy, crisis management, business ethics, and nonmarket strategy. His work appears in numerous journals, including the Journal of Business Ethics, Academy of Management Learning and Education, Management Decision, Journal of Management Education, the European Journal of Management, and Strategic Change. He is a member of the Academy of Management and the Association of Private Enterprise Education (APEE).

Parnell has authored several textbooks and is the author of Strategic Management: Theory and Practice (2016, Academic Media Solutions, 5e), co-author of Crisis Management in the New Strategy Landscape (2013, Sage Publications, 2e), Journal of Contingencies and Crisis Management and co-editor of Business English (2010, Higher Education Press-Beijing, 2e).

Parnell served at the Fulbright Program in Cairo, Egypt in 1995. He has conducted lectures and executive development workshops in China, Egypt, Mexico, and Peru. He has lectured numerous times at China University of Geosciences and the EGADE Business School / Tecnologico de Monterrey.
