= UNCP School of Business =

Coordinates: 34.6914°N 79.1993°W

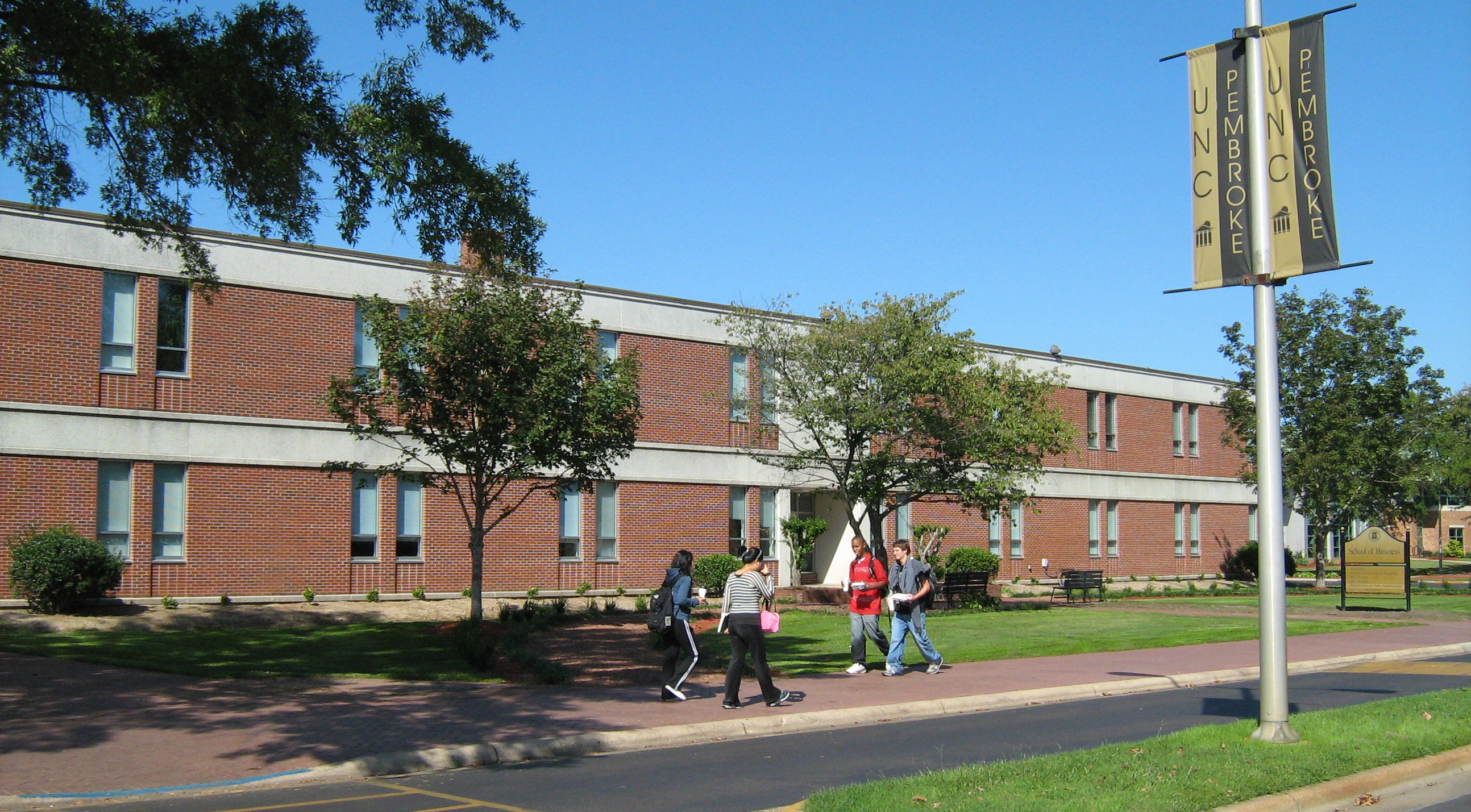
The School of Business building in 2007

The UNCP School of Business is located within the University of North Carolina at Pembroke. All undergraduate and graduate degree programs are fully accredited by the Association to Advance Collegiate Schools of Business (AACSB). The school received AACSB re-accreditation in 2018 and in 2023. UNCP School of Business is a partner in the scholarly journal, the International Journal of Sustainable Strategic Management (IJSSM) published by Inderscience.

== Faculty ==
The UNCP School of Business has thirty full-time faculty positions and 27 adjunct faculty. The school's faculty is organized into three departments. The dean is Mohamed Djerdjouri.

The school has two endowed chairs:

- Thomas Family Endowed Chair in Entrepreneurship
- William Henry Belk Endowed Chair of Management
