= Eden Springs Park =

- U.S. National Register of Historic Places
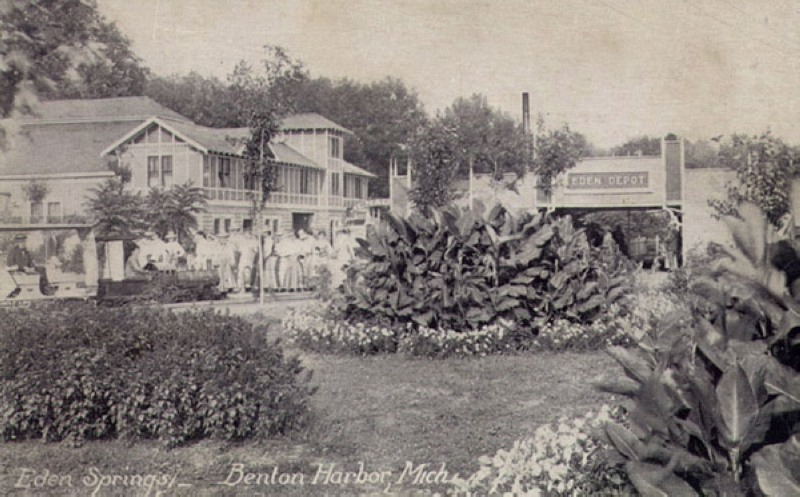
- Interactive map
- Location: 789 M-139; Benton Harbor, Michigan
- Coordinates: 42°6′12″N 86°26′5″W
- Built: 1908
- Architect: Peter Muller
- NRHP reference No.: 100009649
- Added to NRHP: December 26, 2023

Eden Springs Park is an amusement park and associated structures located at 789 M-139 in Benton Harbor, Michigan. It was listed on the National Register of Historic Places in 2023.

== History ==
The House of David commune was formed in 1861 by Benjamin Franklin Purnell. After a career as itinerant preachers, Purnell and his wife settled in Benton Harbor in 1903. After arriving, the group grew quickly, from an original seven members to over 700 in 1907. In 1908, Purnell opened an amusement park and zoo known as Eden Springs Park. A baseball stadium was added in 1910. Local teams played there through the Great Depression. Additional amusement at the park included miniature racing cars, restaurant, penny arcade, pony rides, and dances and shows at the amphitheater. The park also had adornments such as a miniature lighthouse which was built 1928–1929, later removed, and returned in 2025.

However, after World War II, societal changed caused fewer people to visit Eden Springs. The zoo was closed in 1945, baseball teams disbanded in the 1950s, and stage shows that had previously been put on halted in the 1960s. The park closed in 1973. It reopened in 2011.

=== Miniature railroad ===
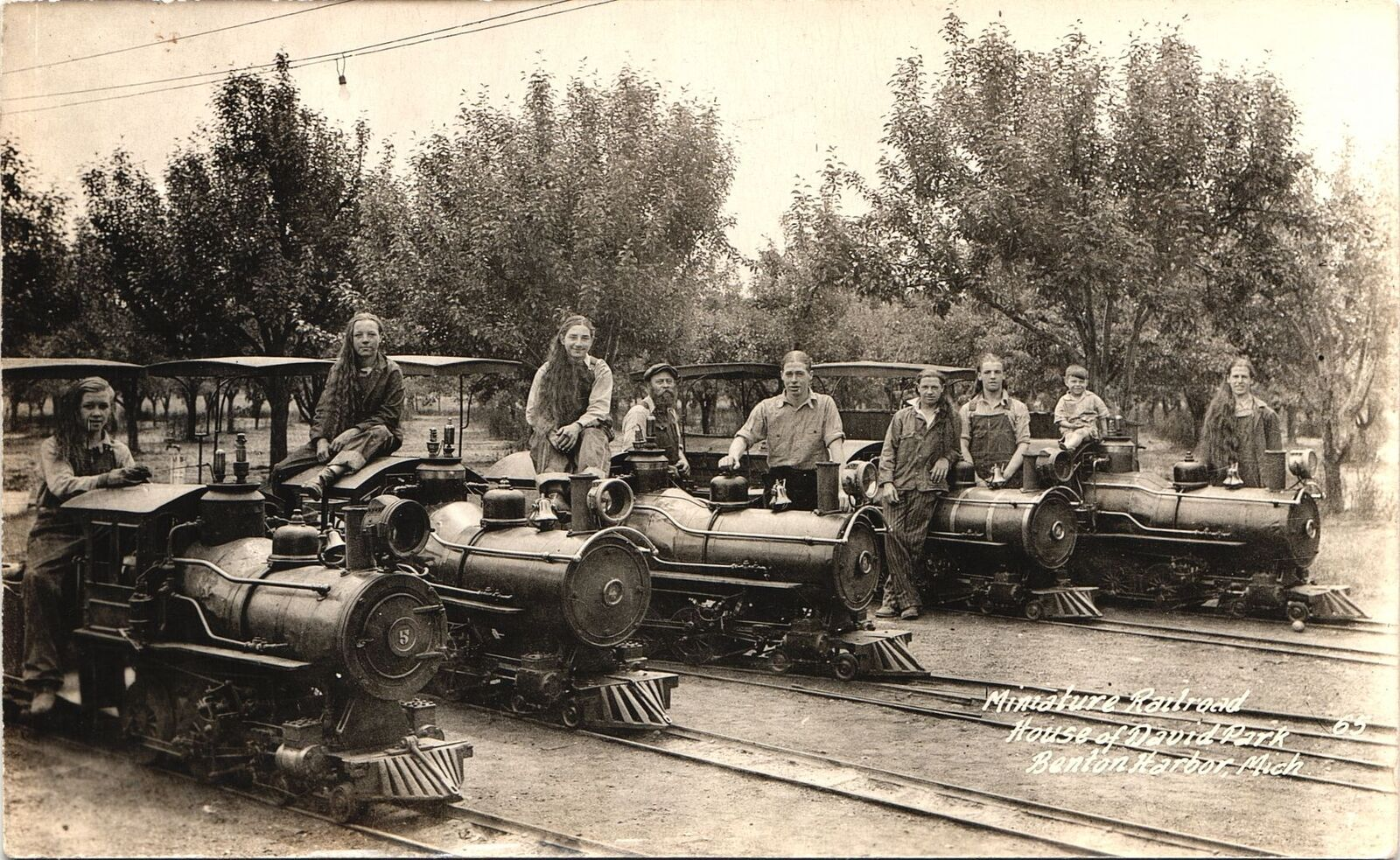
Miniature Railroad at House of David Park

One of the main attractions at The Springs of Eden Park was the coal powered miniature locomotives, purchased in 1908. Members of the commune originally observed similar locomotives at the 1904 Worlds Fair in St. Louis. The trains were used to carry people to the amusement park from the main entrance to the commune on Britain Avenue. In 2000, one of the trains was purchased by the Northwest Ohio Railroad Preservation Group, refurbished and in use at a railway museum in Findlay, Ohio. In 2011, when the park reopened, the railroad at the House of David became operational again.

== Description ==
Eden Springs Park contains the historic Eden Springs amusement park, as well as zoological gardens, rental cabins, and a baseball field. In all, the site has 58 buildings and structures, of which 49 (13 buildings and 20 structures, plus 15 objects, and 1 site) contribute to the historic significance of the property.

== In literature ==
Ring Lardner described the park in his 1916 short story "The Water Cure".
