= Pernell =

Pernell may refer to:

== Given name ==
- Pernell (healer) (fl. 1350), English healer
- Pernell Cooper (1963–2016), American Paralympic powerlifter
- Pernell Davis (born 1976), American football defensive tackle
- Pernell McPhee (born 1988), American football linebacker
- Pernell Roberts (1928–2010), American stage, movie and television actor
- Pernell Saturnino, Grammy Award-winner percussionist from Curaçao
- Pernell Schultz (born 1994), Guyanese footballer
- Pernell Whitaker (1964–2019), American boxer and trainer

== Surname ==
- Geoffrey Pernell, British soldier, rapist and murderer, along with two other soldiers, of Louise Jensen in 1994 in Cyprus
- LeRoy Pernell, American law professor and former dean
- Lia Pernell (born 1981), American rower
- Ruby Pernell (1917–2001), professor of social work at the University of Minnesota

== Places ==
- Pernell, Oklahoma, United States, an unincorporated community
