= Pernell (healer) =

English healer and doctor of the 14th century

Pernell (floruit 1350), was an English healer.

She assisted her physician husband, Thomas de Rasyn in their professional practice. The couple was accused of causing the death of a miller in 1350, but was freed by a royal pardon and allowed to continue their practice. Their medical skills were respected by people of the time.
