= Senator Parnell =

Senator Parnell may refer to:

- Harvey Parnell (1880–1936), Arkansas State Senate
- Sean Parnell (born 1962), Alaska State Senate
