= Purnell, Baltimore =

Neighborhood in Baltimore

Purnell
- Neighborhood of Baltimore
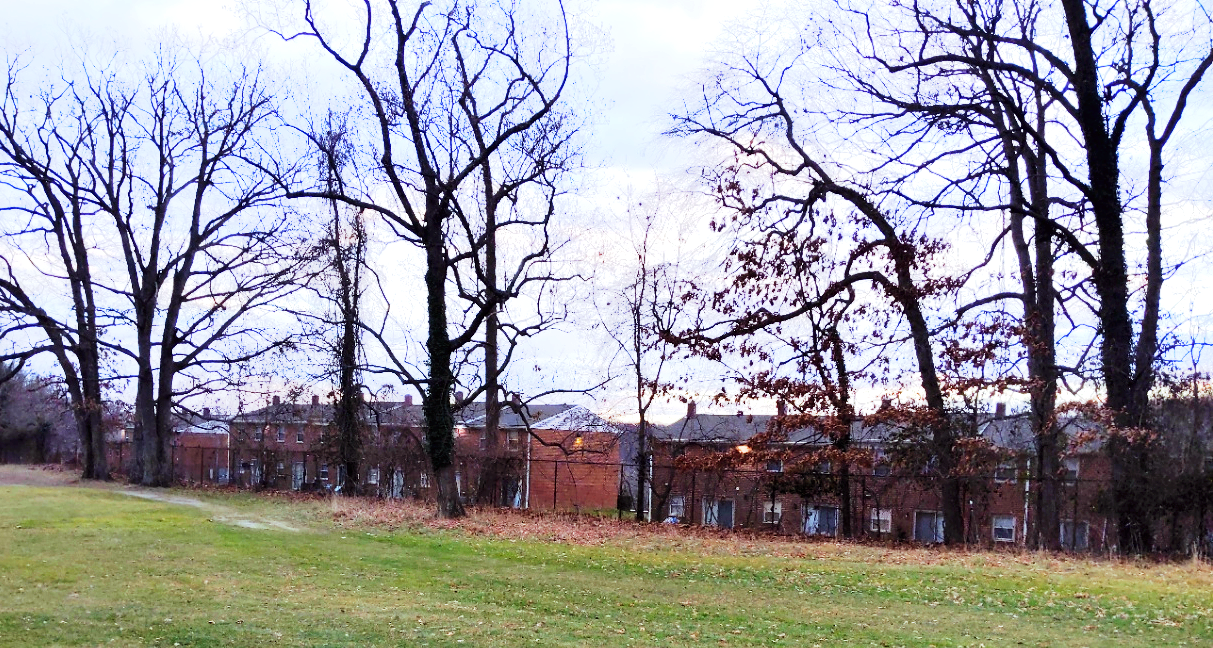
- View from Forest Park Golf Course of Fairway Ridge Apartments on the 2600 block of Gatehouse Drive in Purnell, Baltimore

- Location within Baltimore Location within Maryland Location within the United States
- Coordinates: 39.3208°N 76.7063°W
- Country: United States
- State: Maryland
- City: Baltimore
- City Council: District 8

Population (2020)
  - Total: 596
- Time zone: UTC−5 (Eastern)
  - Summer (DST): UTC−4 (EDT)
- ZIP Codes: 21207
- Area Codes: 410, 443, 667

Purnell is a neighborhood in west Baltimore.

== Geography ==
Purnell is bounded by the Forest Park Golf Course to the north, West Forest Park Avenue to the east, Purnell Drive to the south, and the Baltimore City limits to the west. The neighborhood consists of two residential streets connected to West Forest Park Avenue, Gatehouse Drive, which terminates at a dead end within the neighborhood, and Purnell Drive, which extends beyond the city limits into Baltimore County. Adjacent neighborhoods include Howard Park (north), West Forest Park (east), and Dickeyville (south). To the west, in Baltimore County, it borders the unincorporated Gwynn Oak area in the census-designated place of Woodlawn. The triangular area of Baltimore County bounded by the city line, Gwynn Oak Avenue, and Windsor Mill Road, which the western portion of Purnell Drive extends into, has been referred to by multiple names, including Old Woodlawn, Powhatan Hill, Gwynn Oak, and Larchmont.

== Demographics ==
Historical population
| Year | Pop. | ±% |
|---|---|---|
| 2010 | 849 | — |
| 2020 | 596 | −29.8% |

As of the 2020 United States Census, the population of Purnell was 596, a change of -253 (-29.8%) from the 2010 United States census count of 849.

== History ==
=== Annexation ===
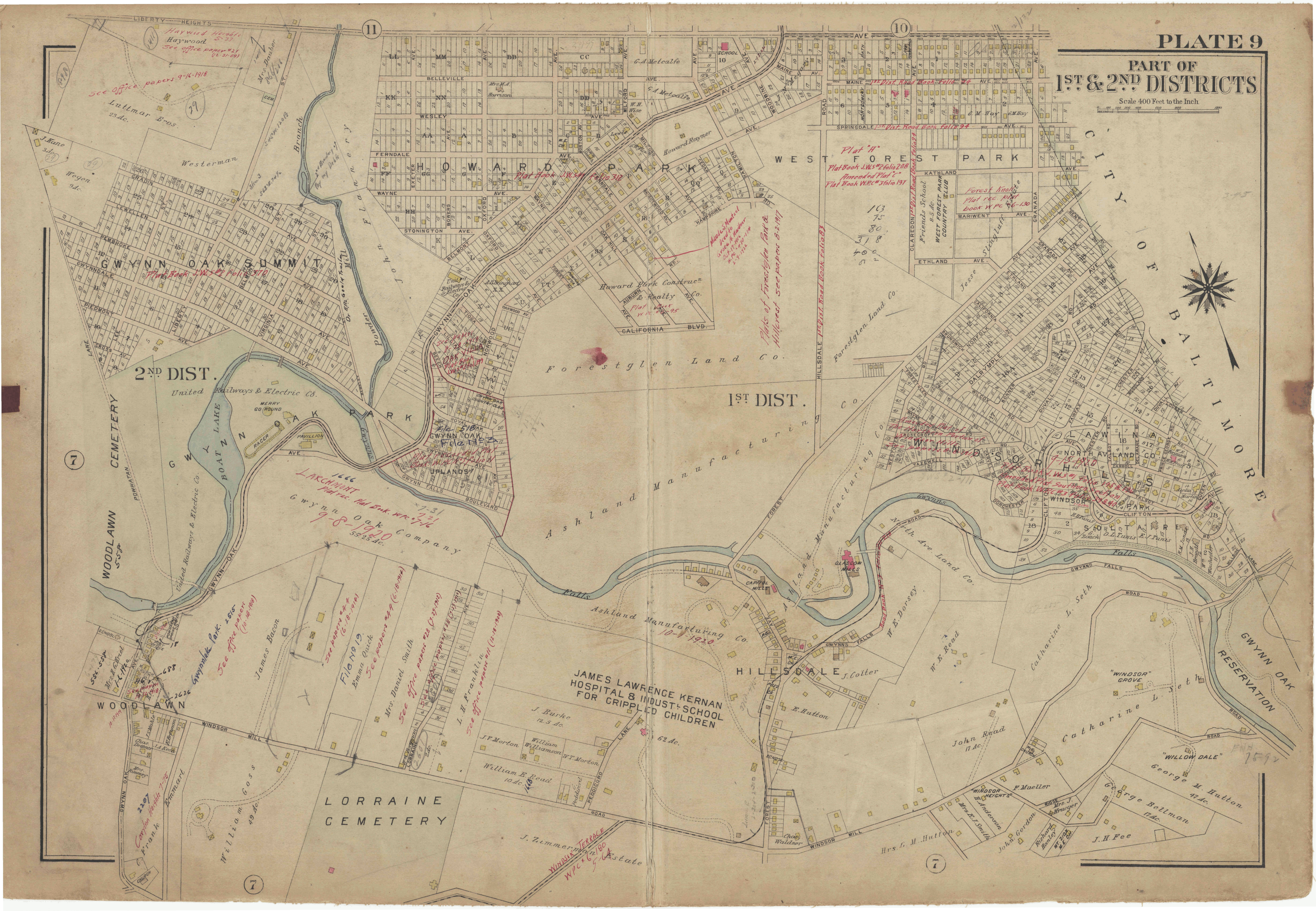
Map of the area of Baltimore County around Gwynns Falls from 1915, prior to the 1918 extension of Baltimore City limits and the 1930 establishment of Purnell Drive

The land Purnell lies on, along with other areas along the periphery of Baltimore's present-day city limits, was annexed to Baltimore City in 1918 following the passage of the Greater Baltimore Bill by the Maryland General Assembly.

=== Establishment of Purnell Drive ===
Purnell is named for Lyttleton Bowen Purnell, a businessman who came to Baltimore from Snow Hill, Worcester County on the Eastern Shore of Maryland in the 1850s. He worked at the John E. Hurst Company, which sold large wholesale dry goods, and went on to become a business partner of Hurst; the company was subsequently renamed Hurst, Purnell, & Co. Purnell Drive was created in 1930 by the city at the request of Purnell's grandson, Lyttleton B. P. Gould, president of the Ashland Manufacturing Company, the milling firm which owned nearby Dickeyville.

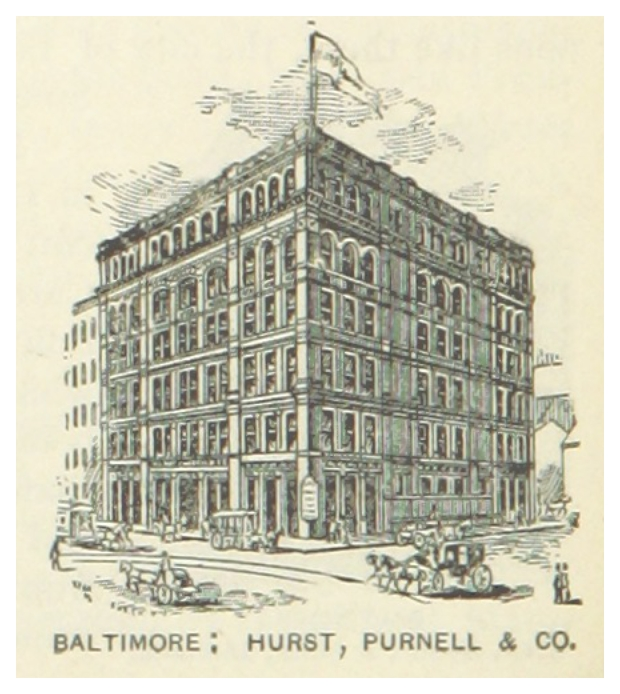
Illustration of the Hurst, Purnell, & Co. building, 1891

=== Village of Purnell civil rights demonstrations ===
In 1966, a garden apartment complex named the Village of Purnell was developed at the 5000 block of Forest Park Avenue, the block which encompasses the width of the Purnell neighborhood as it extends to the west from Forest Park Avenue. The complex covered an area equivalent to about 24 city blocks spread across Gatehouse Drive, which branches off of Forest Park Avenue. The apartments opened amidst civil rights movement demonstrations in Baltimore and across the United States which protested racial segregation. Towards the beginning of August 1966, prior to their opening, a group of African-Americans who had been refused rental at Purnell formed the committee to Integrate Purnell, and demonstrated at the site of the apartments alongside members of the Congress of Racial Equality. On August 12, 1966, the Congress of Racial Equality (C.O.R.E.) staged a "lie-in" demonstration to halt construction which was ongoing at the nearly completed apartments. The Congress of Racial Equality (C.O.R.E) called off demonstrations later that day when Mayor Theodore McKeldin agreed to mediate the dispute in a meeting with the management of the apartment development.

In a three-hour meeting on August 15, 1966, the following week, Mayor McKeldin and two members of his administration attempted to persuade brothers Samuel and Morton Gorn, the owners of the Purnell apartments, to racially integrate the residences. The Mayor was unsuccessful in convincing the owners of C.O.R.E's case. Following the failed meeting, Mayor McKeldin stated his intention to request help from real estate associations to prevent the "escalation" of civil rights demonstrations at Purnell. Activists following the status of the development were undereterred, and demonstrations against segregation at the Purnell Village apartments resumed. C.O.R.E. backed subsequent mass demonstrations in September which aimed to achieve integration without going through the mayor.

Following the assassination of Reverend Martin Luther King Jr. on April 4, 1968, civil unrest broke out in Baltimore on the night of April 6 and continued for days afterwards. White residents of the completed Village of Purnell who opposed segregation wrote to owners Samuel and Morton Gorn criticizing them for refusing to fly the American flag at half-staff after King's death, and requesting that the apartments be racially integrated as a testimony to King's principles. On April 16, 1968, Samuel and Morton Gorn announced that in accordance with the Civil Rights Act of 1968 passed by U.S. President Lyndon B. Johnson, the apartments at Purnell were now open to residents of all races. They notified the Baltimore NAACP and Mayor Thomas D'Alesandro Jr. of this change. However, efforts to integrate the Village of Purnell did not end with the property owners' 1968 announcement. In August 1969, a federal judge stopped rentals at Purnell until a racial bias case was cleared. An African-American couple filed a lawsuit against the Gorn Management Company after they were refused a rental of a two-bedroom apartment on the 2700 block of Gatehouse Drive within the Village of Purnell. They had initially applied for an apartment months in advance of their anticipated move-in date, and were told they would have to apply later. When they did apply later, they were told it was too late to apply. They were told no apartments were available on all subsequent attempts to contact management. In order to assist in proving racial bias for the case, Baltimore Neighborhoods, Inc., sent two white men and a black man to visit the Purnell rental office and request an apartment. Both white men were offered an apartment in the near-term, while the black man was told there would not be any availability until later, and that he should check later. This case was one of multiple cases seen by a federal judge in 1969 after the passage of the Civil Rights Act of the previous year, as property owners attempted discrimination tactics which were less overt in order to evade consequences. A total of 19 people who had complaints of racial discrimination against the Gorn Management Company became involved in the case, which came to a close in November 1972, when the management company was ordered to pay a combined $10,600 in attorney fees and damages to each of the plaintiffs.

=== Apartment fires ===
In October 1969, a fire broke out in a series of apartments on the 2600 block of Gatehouse Drive in the Village of Purnell complex. Fire authorities attributed fire to a weakened basement fire wall which had been broken open for a doorway. A second fire broke out, just fifteen month later in January 1971, which leveled a row of 9 apartments on the 2700 block of Gatehouse Drive, again due to a basement fire wall with an open wooden door. The Fire Department chief remarked that the fire control construction at the complex would not have passed a rating by the Fire Department. There were also not enough fire hydrants within the grounds of the Village of Purnell, requiring firemen to string hoses from past the intersection with Forest Park Avenue outside the complex. The insufficient number of fire hydrants would also not have passed city standards, however, the apartments were built just prior to the passage of more rigorous fire hydrant requirements.

=== Renaming and sale of apartments ===
The Gorn family changed their company's name to Questar in the mid-1980's, with Stephen Gorn, son of Morton Gorn, as the CEO. The name of the Village of Purnell apartments was changed to Fairway Ridge Apartments. In 1997, Questar sold its 18 properties, including the Fairway Ridge Apartments at Purnell, in a $171 million deal with Berkshire Realty Co. Stephen Gorn entered the deal as he saw Questar at a competitive disadvantage against the increasing dominance of real estate investment trusts. With the deal, he became president of Berkshire's mid-Atlantic division. The Gorn-led Questar business was subject to allegations of charging excessive application, holding, and reservation fees in the 1990s, and in 2000, Berkshire Realty was found to have continued these practices at the properties it purchased from the Gorn family by the state Consumer Protection Division. Berkshire denied allegations from the state attorney general that they had violated laws under the Maryland Consumer Protection Act, but agreed to stop charging the improper fees and refund thousands of consumers. Questar is still in business, and went on to open the luxury apartments at 414 Light Street near the Inner Harbor in 2018.

== See also ==
- Cross Keys, another Baltimore neighborhood consisting of a large apartment complex. Questar, the current name of the Gorn-family business that developed Purnell, was selected to lead the redevelopment of Cross Keys in 2021.
