= Ruby Pernell =

American social worker

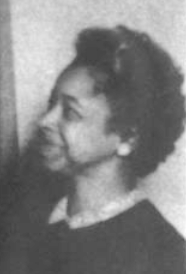
- Ruby Pernell, from a 1963 publication of the US Department of State
- Born: 1917; Birmingham, Alabama
- Died: 2001 (aged 83–84); Cleveland, Ohio
- Occupations: Social worker, college professor, foreign service attaché

Ruby Beatrice Pernell (1917 – February 4, 2001) was a professor of social work who served as a faculty member at the University of Minnesota, Twin Cities and Case Western Reserve University. In 1963, she was appointed social work attaché at the US Embassy in India.

== Early life and education ==
Pernell was born in Birmingham, Alabama and raised in Pittsburgh, Pennsylvania. She graduated from Schenley High School. She earned a BS in biology from the University of Pittsburgh in 1939, and stayed to earn a Master of Social Work degree in 1944. She completed doctoral studies in social administration at the University of London in 1959, with a dissertation titled "A Study of Interpersonal Relationships Between Adolescent Members of a Youth Club and Their Leaders, with Special Reference to the Nature of the Factors Determining Such Relationships".

== Career ==
Pernell directed the James Weldon Johnson Camp Association in 1945, for the Urban League of Pittsburgh. She was the first African American faculty member when she was hired by the University of Minnesota as an instructor of social work in 1948; she became associate professor in 1953, and was promoted to professor rank in 1960. Pernell was the first African-American to earn tenure at the University of Minnesota. In 1963, Pernell was appointed social welfare attaché to the American embassy in New Delhi.

In 1968, Pernell was named the Grace Longwell Coyle Professor in Social Work at Case Western Reserve University. From 1973 to 1974, she was acting dean of the School of Applied Social Sciences at Case Western. She retired as professor emerita from Case Western in 1983.

== Publications ==
- "Professional and Volunteer Workers in Traditional Youth-Serving Agencies" (Social Work, 1957)
- "Mediation of Differences Among Groups" (International Social Work, 1977)
- "Old Themes for a New World" (book chapter, 1986)
- "Maximizing the Potential of the Social Group Work Method" (book chapter, 1991)

== Personal life and legacy ==
Pernell died in Cleveland in 2001. Her papers are housed in the University of Minnesota's Social Welfare History Archives.
