= Governor Parnell =

Governor Parnell may refer to:

- Harvey Parnell (1880–1936), 29th Governor of Arkansas
- Sean Parnell (born 1962), 10th Governor of Alaska
