= William Parnell =

William Parnell may refer to:

- William R. Parnell (1836–1910), Irish-born adventurer and soldier
- William Parnell (architect) (died 1886), English architect
- William Parnell (cricketer) (1837–1879), British Army officer and cricketer
- William Parnell-Hayes (1780–1821), Irish politician
- William Parnell (mathematician) (fl. 2004–present as of October 2026), British mathematician and Professor of Applied Mathematics at the University of Manchester

== See also ==
- Bill Parnell (1928–2008), Canadian middle distance runner
