= George Washington Purnell House =

Historic house in Maryland, United States

- U.S. National Register of Historic Places
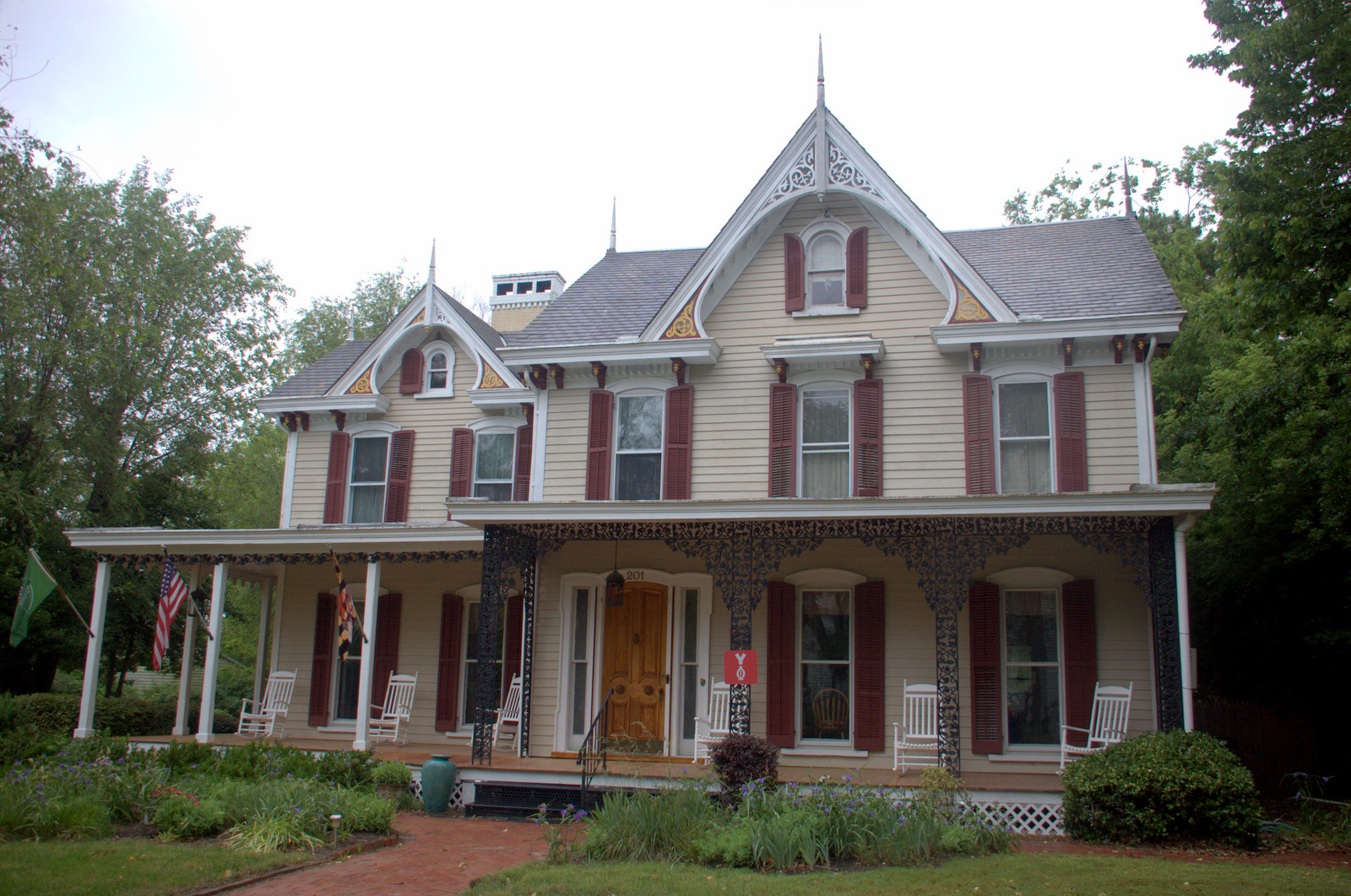

- Location within Maryland Location within the United States
- Location: 201 E. Market Street (Bus 113), Snow Hill, Maryland
- Coordinates: 38°10′40″N 75°23′31″W
- Area: 2.2 acres (0.89 ha)
- Built: 1860
- Architectural style: Gothic Revival
- NRHP reference No.: 96000920
- Added to NRHP: August 22, 1996

The George Washington Purnell House in Snow Hill, Maryland, is a gothic revival house built around 1860. The frame-and-weatherboard house retains its original decorative millwork; and is enhanced by a cast-iron fence along the street frontage.

It was listed on the National Register of Historic Places in 1996.
