= Parnell Township, Polk County, Minnesota =

Parnell Township, Minnesota
- Township
- Location of Parnell Township, within Polk County, Minnesota
- Coordinates: 47°53′1″N 96°32′11″W
- Country: United States
- State: Minnesota
- County: Polk

Area
  - Total: 36.3 sq mi (94.0 km^{2})
  - Land: 36.3 sq mi (94.0 km^{2})
  - Water: 0 sq mi (0.0 km^{2})
- Elevation: 942 ft (287 m)

Population (2020)
  - Total: 61
  - Density: 1.7/sq mi (0.65/km^{2})
- Time zone: UTC-6 (Central (CST))
  - Summer (DST): UTC-5 (CDT)
- FIPS code: 27-49840
- GNIS feature ID: 0665260

Parnell Township is a township in Polk County, Minnesota, United States. It is part of the Grand Forks-ND-MN Metropolitan Statistical Area. The population was 61 at the 2020 census.

Parnell Township was named for Charles Stewart Parnell (1846–1891), an Irish politician.

== Geography ==
According to the United States Census Bureau, the township has a total area of 36.3 square miles (94.0 km^{2}), all land.

== Demographics ==
At the 2000 census there were 87 people in 31 households, including 23 families, in the township. The population density was 2.4 people per square mile (0.9/km^{2}). There were 31 housing units at an average density of 0.9/sq mi (0.3/km^{2}). The racial makeup of the township was 100.00% White. Hispanic or Latino of any race were 1.15%.

Of the 31 households, 48.4% had children under the age of 18 living with them, 74.2% were married couples living together, 3.2% had a female householder with no husband present, and 22.6% were non-families. 22.6% of households were one person, and 12.9% were one person aged 65 or older. The average household size was 2.81 and the average family size was 3.33.

In the township the population was spread out, with 33.3% under the age of 18, 6.9% from 18 to 24, 26.4% from 25 to 44, 21.8% from 45 to 64, and 11.5% 65 or older. The median age was 36 years. For every 100 females, there were 81.3 males. For every 100 females age 18 and over, there were 107.1 males.

The median income for a household in the township was $45,000, and the median family income was $65,625. Males had a median income of $36,250 versus $9,375 for females. The per capita income for the township was $22,360. There were no families and 4.0% of the population living below the poverty line, including no under eighteens and none of those over 64.
