= John Wroe =

English evangalist (1782–1863)

- Born: 19 September 1782; East Bowling, Yorkshire, UKGBI
- Died: 5 February 1863 (aged 80); Collingwood, Melbourne, Colony of Victoria
- Other names: John Roe; Joannes Roes
- Occupations: Farmer; wool comber
- Spouse: Mary Wroe (m. 1816; died 1853)

Ecclesiastical career
- Religion: Christian Israelitism (1822–)
- Church: Christian Israelite Church

John Wroe (Latin: Joannes Roes; 1782–1863) was a British farmer and wool comber, known for founding the Christian Israelite Church. Wroe is considered the fifth messenger in the Christian Israelite tradition.

== Early life ==
John Wroe, alternatively spelt Roe, was born on 19 September 1782 in the hamlet of East Bowling, (present-day, Bradford) to Susannah Roe (née Fernley) and Joseph Roe, a farmer, worsted manufacturer, and collier. Baptised at Bradford Cathedral on 8 December, Wroe was raised in a devout Church of England household. The Wroe family believed in prophecies, naming their youngest son Thomas after his maternal grandfather who prophesied that the "Lord would raise up a priest from the fruits of his loin".

Wroe had at least two brothers, Joseph and Thomas, and one sister. Wroe claimed that he was mistreated by his father, who favoured his brother Joseph. Wroe had severe Kyphosis, which he claimed was a result of him having to carry "a window stone to the second floor" whilst conducting repairs on some houses bought by his father, and potentially a speech disorder which affected the fluency of his speech. Working with his father from a young age, Wroe received little education and was functionally illiterate. However, the extent of Wroe's illiteracy was possible exaggerated by both his followers and critics.

Around aged 15, Wroe began an wool-comber apprenticeship with his uncle but was persuaded to return home by his father. Around 1810, Wroe set up his own farming and wool combing business on Tong Street. By the latter half of 1816, Wroe began exhibiting symptoms of mania.

== Religious life ==
=== Visions ===
In Autumn 1819, Wroe became severely ill with a fever. Advised to make final arrangements, Wroe requested that his wife Mary Wroe call for Methodist ministers to pray with him. However, the Methodist ministers refused and Wroe requested that Mary read the Bible to him. During his recovery Wroe read his Bible, often in public. Later in the year, Wroe's fevers returned and began having visions. Wroe spoke of his visions to both his family and neighbours and although not a Southcottian himself, many of Wroe's neighbours were members of the Bradford Southcottian body. On the 12 November, Wroe's neighbour Abraham Holmes, a Bradford Southcottian, began transcribing Wroe's visions. Wroe continued to experience further visions and crowds began to gather to hear him speak on them.

On 1 February 1820, Wroe became blind during a vision. Sceptical, Mary had Wroe's head shaved by a neighbour. In early 1820, Holmes published a chapbook of Wroe's first visions entitled The Vision of an Angel. On 3 April 1820, George Turner head of the Southcottian movement received a letter, whilst being held at the Retreat asylum, from his Bradford followers "making inquiries about Wroe's visions".

=== Christian Israelitism ===
Following Turner's death in September 1821, William Shaw became the movements successor. However, by 1822 several Southcottian society committees recognised Wroe as Turner's successor .

On the 13 December 1822, Wroe founded the Christian Israelite Church in Wakefield, which was commenced with a 36 hour gathering.

Wroe, although often persecuted and threatened, travelled throughout Europe including Gibraltar, Spain, France, Germany, Italy, Scotland, and Wales. He later travelled to the United States, and Australia.

Wroe's name was Latinised as Joannes Roes by his followers.

The Christian Israelite Church was originally set up in Ashton-under-Lyne, Lancashire and from 1822 to 1831 the church's headquarters were in the town. In the 1820s the church trustees wanted to turn Ashton-under-Lyne into a "new Jerusalem". They intended to build a wall around the town with four gateways, and although the wall was never constructed, the four gatehouses were, as was a printing press. These plans failed when the Trustees were replaced and the church headquarters moved to Gravesend in Kent in the 1830s. Popular opinion in Ashton turned against Wroe when, in 1831, he was accused of indecent behaviour, but the charges were dismissed. The church spread to Australia, where it is still active.

On 5 February 1863, Wroe died in the suburb of Collingwood, Melbourne in the Colony of Victoria (present-day, Victoria, Australia) aged 81. Wroe left church affairs in the hands of his trustees.

== Personal life ==
On 22 April 1816, Wroe married Mary Wroe (née Appleby; 1785–1853). Together they had at least 7 children, 3 of which died in infancy.

== Cultural depictions and legacy ==
Wroe's life was the basis of a novel, Mr Wroe's Virgins by Jane Rogers. In 1993 Jonathan Pryce featured as Wroe, alongside Kathy Burke and Minnie Driver, in a BBC mini-series adaptation of the novel directed by Danny Boyle.
