= Parnell Township, Traverse County, Minnesota =

Township in Minnesota, United States

Parnell Township, Minnesota
- Township
- Location within the state of Minnesota Parnell Township, Minnesota (the United States)
- Coordinates: 45°37′57″N 96°35′1″W
- Country: United States
- State: Minnesota
- County: Traverse

Area
  - Total: 36.4 sq mi (94.4 km^{2})
  - Land: 36.4 sq mi (94.3 km^{2})
  - Water: 0.039 sq mi (0.1 km^{2})
- Elevation: 1,120 ft (340 m)

Population (2000)
  - Total: 62
  - Density: 1.8/sq mi (0.7/km^{2})
- Time zone: UTC-6 (Central (CST))
  - Summer (DST): UTC-5 (CDT)
- FIPS code: 27-49858
- GNIS feature ID: 0665261

Parnell Township is a township in Traverse County, Minnesota, United States. The population was 62 at the 2000 census.

Parnell Township was organized in 1881, and named for Charles Stewart Parnell (1846–1891), an Irish politician.

== Geography ==
According to the United States Census Bureau, the township has a total area of 36.5 square miles (94.4 km^{2}), of which 36.4 square miles (94.3 km^{2}) is land and 0.04 square mile (0.1 km^{2}) (0.08%) is water.

== Demographics ==
At the 2000 census, there were 62 people, 29 households and 16 families residing in the township. The population density was 1.7 per square mile (0.7/km^{2}). There were 32 housing units at an average density of 0.9/sq mi (0.3/km^{2}). The racial makeup of the township was 96.77% White, 1.61% African American, and 1.61% from two or more races.

There were 29 households, of which 20.7% had children under the age of 18 living with them, 51.7% were married couples living together, 3.4% had a female householder with no husband present, and 44.8% were non-families. 44.8% of all households were made up of individuals, and 13.8% had someone living alone who was 65 years of age or older. The average household size was 2.14 and the average family size was 3.06.

Age distribution was 27.4% under the age of 18, 4.8% from 18 to 24, 24.2% from 25 to 44, 22.6% from 45 to 64, and 21.0% who were 65 years of age or older. The median age was 41 years. For every 100 females, there were 129.6 males. For every 100 females age 18 and over, there were 164.7 males.

The median household income was $30,000, and the median family income was $33,438. Males had a median income of $31,250 versus $23,750 for females. The per capita income for the township was $10,887. There were 17.6% of families and 29.4% of the population living below the poverty line, including 42.1% of under eighteens and 10.5% of those over 64.
