= Christian Israelite Church =

Church founded in 1822 by John Wroe

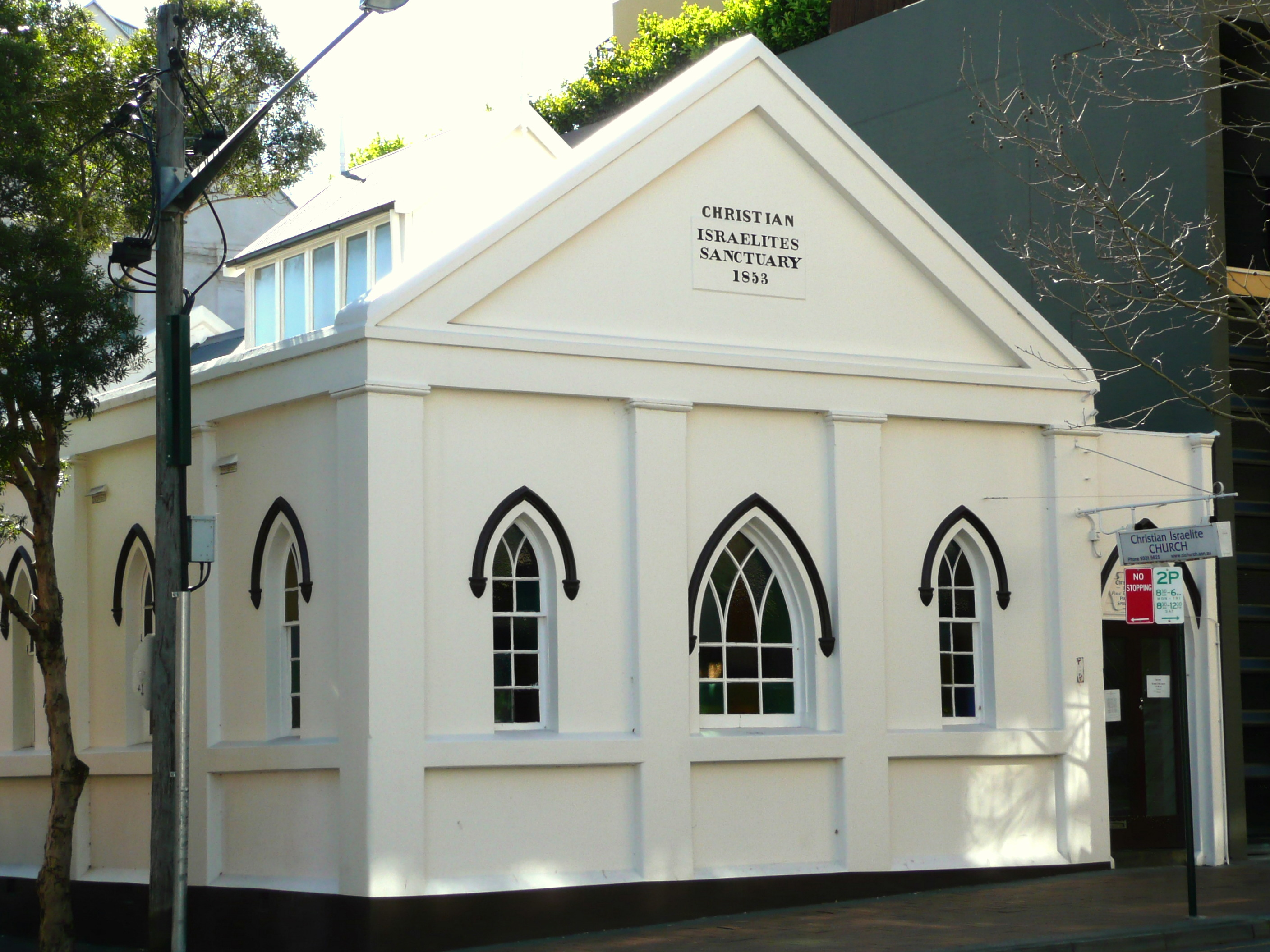
- Christian Israelite Church in Darlinghurst, an inner city suburb of Sydney, Australia
- Type: Millenarian Christianity
- Founder: John Wroe
- Origin: 1822; 204 years ago Wakefield, England
- Official website: cichurch.com

The Christian Israelite Church is a Christian denomination founded in 1822 by John Wroe (1782–1863) in Wakefield, Yorkshire, England, inspired by the teachings of Joanna Southcott. The Church holds that both the Old and New Testaments are of equal divine authority, teaching that the Law of Moses and the Gospel of Jesus Christ together form the complete instruction of God to His people. Central to its faith is the belief that God's promises to the twelve tribes of Israel will be fulfilled in the latter days, when a remnant of their descendants will be gathered and prepared for the return of Jesus Christ.

Founded in England, the Church spread during the nineteenth century to Australia, North America, and New Zealand. Today it is primarily based in Australia, with active congregations in New South Wales and Victoria, and has been in continuous operation since 1822.

== History ==
=== Background and origins ===
The Christian Israelite Church emerged from a broader tradition of millenarian religious movements in late eighteenth and early nineteenth century England, a period of intense pre-millennial expectation shaped in part by the upheaval of the French Revolution. The Church is theologically rooted in what historians have termed the Southcottian movement, a succession of prophetic figures each of whom contributed a doctrinal thread that would later be woven together in the teachings of John Wroe.The Church acknowledges five such messengers in this line: Jane Lead (1623–1704), who founded the Philadelphian Society and wrote extensively on the hope of physical redemption and the gathering of a spiritual firstborn; Richard Brothers (1757–1824), who revived the concept of the lost ten tribes of Israel residing among the British people; Joanna Southcott (1750–1814), who gathered a large following around prophetic writings and the figure of Shiloh drawn from Genesis 49:10; George Turner, a Leeds merchant who continued Southcott's mission after her death and emphasised the imminent ingathering of Israel; and William Shaw, who received communications from 1819 until his death in 1822. Though the Christian Israelite Church developed from this tradition, it was established as an independent church rather than a continuation of any of these earlier movements.

=== Founding ===
The Christian Israelite Church was founded by John Wroe, born on 19 September 1782 in Bowling, a parish of Bradford, Yorkshire, the son of a worsted manufacturer. After a limited education he worked in his father's business before taking a farm of his own. In 1819 he suffered a near-fatal fever, during which he became deeply concerned about his spiritual welfare. Following his recovery he began to experience what he described as visions, often preceded by temporary blindness, during which he believed divine communications were revealed to him. The Church officially commenced with a gathering beginning at midnight on 13 December 1822 in Wakefield, Yorkshire, which continued for thirty-six hours. Wroe left the meeting at 1:00 am to begin his public ministry, which he would continue for forty years. Members still mark this occasion annually, keeping an hour at that time in commemoration of the Church's beginnings. Throughout his ministry Wroe did not handle money himself, nor did he write his own records. He was accompanied at all times by a writer who recorded the highlights of his journeys and teachings. These records were compiled into ten-yearly volumes - The Life and Journal of John Wroe - which remain in active use by Church members today. The Church established two levels of membership from its earliest days. Covenanted Members make a formal commitment to aspire to keep the instructions of the Mosaic Law and to follow the example of the life of Jesus Christ. Uncovenanted Members sign to a belief in the divine inspiration of the four books of Moses and the four Gospels, and express a desire to follow Christ's example, without making a formal outward covenant.

=== Spread across Britain and beyond ===
John Wroe travelled extensively to spread the Church's message, visiting many parts of the United Kingdom and Ireland as well as Gibraltar, Spain, France, Italy, Germany, and later North America, Australia, and New Zealand. Some of his early voyages were made in sailing ships in difficult conditions, with many hardships recorded in his Journal. Bodies of members were established in numerous British towns including Gravesend, London, Lincoln, Sheffield, Bradford, and Huddersfield, with further congregations in Ireland and Scotland. The headquarters of the Church, originally at Gravesend, were later transferred to Ashton-under-Lyne in Lancashire, which had been associated with the Christian Israelite movement since Wroe's first visit there in 1824, where he preached to large congregations, sometimes in the open. A Church printing press was established at Ashton, which became a significant centre for the publication and distribution of Church literature. In 1924, new premises were built on Richmond Street, equipped with modern machinery, with an American Church member of considerable printing experience placed in charge.

=== Growth in Australia ===
John Wroe made his first visit to Australia in 1843, spending time in the Sydney and Penrith area. His venture into the country proved highly successful and by the turn of the twentieth century congregations had been established throughout New South Wales, Victoria, Van Diemen's Land, and South Australia. The Sydney congregation was the first established in Australia, initially meeting at the home of member John Beaumont in Castlereagh Street before moving to a meeting room in Pitt Street. In 1853 a sanctuary was created in Campbell Street, Darlinghurst, which remains in use today and is listed under a Heritage order. The Melbourne congregation, one of the largest in the Church's history with over 560 members recorded between 1854 and 1899, built a bluestone sanctuary in Fitzroy in 1863, also now heritage listed, which serves today as the Church's headquarters. The Singleton congregation, begun around 1858 through the missionary work of travelling preacher David Gardiner, grew steadily through the nineteenth century and remains today the largest single congregation, maintaining a brass band and choir that presents regular musical programmes to the broader community. John Wroe died in Melbourne on 4 February 1863, aged 81, while on his fifth visit to Australia, leaving the Church to continue under the governance of Trustees. Throughout his ministry he consistently impressed upon his hearers not to follow him as anything more than a man, urging them instead to follow the Spirit of which he regarded himself as a mouthpiece, and to weigh his teachings against the Bible.

=== Present day ===
The Christian Israelite Church has been in continuous operation since its founding in 1822. Today the Church is primarily centred in Australia with active congregations meeting in Sydney, Terrigal, Singleton, Lake Macquarie, and Windsor in New South Wales, and in Fitzroy, Melbourne in Victoria. Individual members also remain in England and the United States. Services from the Sydney congregation have been broadcast live via the internet, and the Church continues to publish literature for its members.

== Controversies and historical misconceptions ==
The history of the Christian Israelite Church has been subject to considerable misrepresentation in both historical literature and popular accounts. The Church's own historical records note that much of this folklore originated with sensationalised newspaper reporting of the nineteenth century, at a time when newspapers faced no legal consequences for inaccurate reporting, and with accounts promoted by individuals who had become adversarial toward John Wroe following internal disputes.

=== The 1831 allegations ===
In 1831 allegations of indecent behaviour were brought against John Wroe in Ashton-under-Lyne. The Church's historical records indicate these allegations were connected to a broader dispute involving Samuel Walker and William Masterman, treasurers of a cooperative business known as the "Shop Company", who had become adversarial toward Wroe over a financial disagreement and had aligned themselves with a rival prophetic figure, John Ward (also known as Zion Ward). The allegations were found to be false. A number of Ashton members nonetheless departed, some of whom went on to form the New and Latter House of Israel. Wroe resettled at Wakefield and continued to lead the Church until his death.

=== The River Aire baptism ===
A widely repeated claim holds that John Wroe announced he would walk on water or part the River Aire at his public baptism in 1824, and that 30,000 spectators attended. The original flier advertising the event, reproduced in the Church's historical records, states only that Wroe would be publicly baptised in the river, no claim of miraculous acts appears anywhere in it. Wroe's own Journal records that thousands witnessed the baptism, a figure the Church's history site notes is far more consistent with the population of the Bradford parish at the time than the figure of 30,000 reported in the press.

=== Other claims and fictional portrayals ===
A number of other claims about John Wroe and the early Church have circulated in historical literature and popular accounts, many of which the Church's historical records attribute to the same pattern of sensationalised press reporting and accounts originating with individuals hostile to Wroe following the internal disputes of the early 1830s. The extent of this misrepresentation is illustrated by a blue plaque erected in Ashton-under-Lyne at a surviving gatehouse, which an independent historical review noted incorrectly states that Wroe was banished from the town and fled to Australia, in fact, he continued to live in Wakefield and made regular return visits to Ashton.

The most widely circulated fictionalised account is the 1991 novel Mr Wroe's Virgins by Jane Rogers, later adapted as a BBC television drama serial, which presents a dramatised narrative based on the 1831 allegations as though historically grounded. The Church's historical records specifically identify this narrative as having originated with Walker and Masterman - the individuals involved in the Shop Company dispute - describing the "seven virgins" story as fictional and noting that allegations of this nature were examined and found to be false at the time. The prominence of the novel and its BBC adaptation has nonetheless contributed significantly to popular perceptions of the Church's early history that the Church itself regards as without historical basis.

== Beliefs ==
The Christian Israelite Church teaches that both the Old and New Testaments are of equal divine authority, holding that the Law of Moses and the Gospel of Jesus Christ together constitute the complete instruction of God to His people. The Church regards these not as separate or contradictory but as unified, with the Gospel understood as fulfilling rather than replacing the Law.

The Church believes in God Almighty as a tripartite being and creator of all things, in Jesus Christ as the only begotten Son of God and the Messiah foretold in the Old Testament, and in the Holy Ghost as a comforter and teacher for believers. It also holds to the existence of Satan, in whom God allowed iniquity to be placed, and teaches that Satan's influence is responsible for mankind's inability to keep God's law.

Central to the Church's teachings is the belief that God made specific promises in Scripture to Israel (His chosen people) that remain to be fulfilled in the latter days. The Church teaches that a remnant of the descendants of the twelve tribes of Israel, including the ten tribes whose distinct identity was largely lost following their historical dispersal, will come forward in the latter days to fulfil the obligations and receive the promises of God. The mission of the Church is described as awakening these descendants to this calling and bringing them together at God's appointed time (Matthew 10:5,6; Revelation 19). While the concept of the lost tribes appears in various other religious traditions, the Christian Israelite Church's interpretation is grounded specifically in the unity of Law and Gospel and is distinct from movements such as British Israelism or the Black Hebrew Israelites.

The Church teaches that through belief in the sacrifice of Jesus, believers are counted as righteous before God and can be assured of the resurrection of their souls at Christ's return. Beyond this, the Church holds that a small number will fully prove their faith through obedience to God's instructions and will thereby receive what the Statement of Belief describes as "the redemption of spirit and soul and body - this living mortal body made immortal without seeing death" (1 Thessalonians 5:23; Revelation 14:1-5).

The Church believes, in accordance with the teachings of the Book of Revelation, that there are two resurrections of the dead. At the First Resurrection, all souls come before the judgment of God. Those who have faithfully followed Christ, together with those who, under the Mosaic Law, practiced the sacrifices of repentance in faith and obedience, are glorified and receive a spiritual, celestial body. Those who remain unrepentant are not granted this glory but are returned to the grave, experiencing what Scripture describes as the "second death" until the time of the Final Resurrection. At this Second or Final Resurrection, Satan is revealed as the ultimate author of all evil and rebellion against God. The unrepentant are then judged according to their works and they are raised to a state of glory corresponding to that judgment.

The Church holds that the return of Jesus Christ is near and that the present time corresponds to the period described in Scripture as the latter days (Matthew 24; Mark 13; Luke 21).

== See also ==
- Joanna Southcott
- Millenarianism
- New and Latter House of Israel
