= Richard Brothers =

Teacher of British Israelism (1757–1824)

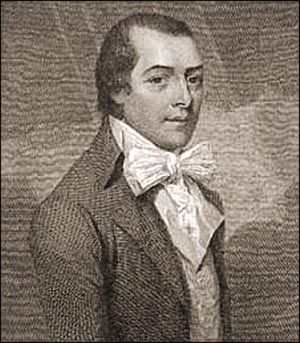
Richard Brothers

Richard Brothers (25 December 1757 – 25 January 1824) was an early believer and teacher of British Israelism, a theory concerning the Lost Ten Tribes of Israel.

== Biography ==
=== Life ===
Brothers was born in Port Kirwan, Newfoundland (earlier known as Admiral's Cove). He was educated in Woolwich, England. He entered the Royal Navy and served under Keppel and Rodney. In 1783, he became lieutenant, and was honourably discharged on 28 July 1783, receiving a pension which amounted to half-pay (54 pounds per year). He then travelled on the continent of Europe and later married Elizabeth Hassall in 1786. His marriage was reported as being "unhappy" and so he returned to service in the Royal Navy.

Because he came to believe that military service was not compatible with deeply held beliefs rooted in Christianity, in 1789 he once again left the Navy. Built upon the principle of individual revelation, Brothers believed that he could not serve the King as head of the Church of England.

In 1791, he began to question the oath he had been required to take for receipt of his military half-pay, and he found himself with little income as a result of his subsequent actions. Brothers then divided his time between the open air and the workhouse, where he developed the idea that he had a special divine commission. Brothers claimed to hear the voice of an attending angel which proclaimed to him the fall of Babylon the Great, which was in fact London. Apparently upon Brothers's plea for mercy, God decided to spare London for a time and the destruction was halted. Around this time, Brothers was also expectant of a heavenly lady who would descend from the clouds showering him with money, love and happiness. In February 1792 Brothers declared himself a healer and claimed he could restore sight to the blind. He drew large crowds, but not due to his healing ability as much as his small gifts of money to those he prayed for.

=== Works ===
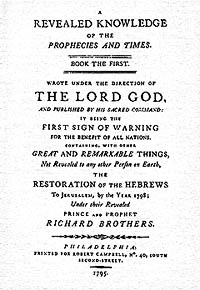
A Revealed Knowledge of the Prophesies and Times, 1794, the most important work of Richard Brothers

In 1793 Brothers declared himself to be the apostle of a new religion. He began to see himself as possessing a special role in the gathering of the Jews back into Palestine, in particular, the "Jews" who were hidden amongst the population of Great Britain. In similarity to modern British Israelists, Brothers asserted that the "hidden Israel" had no notion of its biological lineage and that part of his role would be to teach them of their true identity and lead them to the land of Canaan. Brothers proclaimed himself to be Prince of the Hebrews, literal descendant of the Biblical House of David, and the Nephew of the Almighty, who would rule over Israel until the return of Jesus Christ. Brothers declared he would achieve all this using a rod he had fashioned from a wild rosebush, with which he would perform miracles, as Moses had done.

All this was declared in the first British Israelist publication in 1794:

A REVEALED KNOWLEDGE OF THE PROPHECIES AND TIMES, Book the First, wrote [sic] under the direction of the LORD GOD and published by His Sacred Command, it being the first sign of Warning for the benefit of All Nations; Containing with other great and remarkable things not revealed to any other Person on Earth, the Restoration of the Hebrews to Jerusalem by the year of 1798 under their revealed Prince and Prophet (i.e., Richard Brothers). London, Printed in the year of Christ 1794.

Brothers began to attract quite a following, but due to his rejection of organisational work, and eccentric nature, he did not develop any sort of social movement. In consequence of prophesying the death of the King and the end of the monarchy, he was arrested for treason in 1795, and imprisoned on the grounds of being criminally insane. His case was, however, brought before Parliament by his ardent disciple, Nathaniel Brassey Halhed, an orientalist and a member of the House of Commons. As a result Brothers was removed to a private asylum in Islington.

While he was in the private asylum Brothers wrote a variety of prophetic pamphlets which gained him many believers. Amongst his supporters was William Sharp, the engraver. Some of his political predictions (such as the violent death of Louis XVI) seemed to be proof that he was inspired. But when Brothers predicted that, on 19 November 1795 he would be revealed as Prince of the Hebrews and Ruler of the world, and the date passed without any such manifestation, Sharp deserted him to become a religious follower of Joanna Southcott. His followers tended to drift away either disillusioned or embarrassed.

=== Death ===
Brothers spent the last 30 years of his life designing the flags, uniforms, and palaces of the New Jerusalem. John Finlayson finally secured his release from the private asylum in 1806, and Brothers moved into his London home, where he died a lonely figure on 25 January 1824. Finlayson then began a financial campaign against the Government, seeking payment of an enormous claim for his maintenance of Richard Brothers prior to his death.

== Bibliography ==
- Chisholm, Hugh, ed. (1911). "Brothers, Richard" . Encyclopædia Britannica (11th ed.). Cambridge University Press.
- Cottrell-Boyce, Aidan (2021). Israelism in Modern Britain. Routledge. ISBN 978-1-000-17236-2.
