= Popplewell =

Popplewell is a surname. Notable people with the surname include:

- Andrew Popplewell (born 1959), judge of the High Court of England and Wales
- Anna Popplewell (born 1988), English actress
- Claire Popplewell, British producer and creative director for BBC Studios
- Cicely Popplewell, early computer programmer in Manchester who worked with Alan Turing
- Dan Popplewell, English musician, co-founder of Ooberman
- Don Popplewell (born c. 1949), American football player
- Ernest Popplewell, Baron Popplewell (1899–1977), British politician
- Fred Popplewell, Australian golfer and winner of the Australian Open
- Jack Popplewell (1911–1996), English writer and playwright
- Josephine Popplewell, known as Rosa Bird (1866–1927), Australian-English soprano
- Lulu Popplewell (born 1991), English actress
- Nadiv Popplewell, Israeli from Wakefield, Yorkshire, who was taken hostage in 2023 and died in Gaza in 2024
- Nick Popplewell (born 1964), Irish rugby player
- Nigel Popplewell (born 1957), English cricketer
- Sir Oliver Popplewell (1927–2024), British judge
- Paul Popplewell (born 1977), English actor
- Richard Popplewell (1935–2016), English organist and composer
- Tony Popplewell (born 1941), New Zealand rower

== Fictional characters ==
- Paige Popplewell, from the British soap opera Doctors
