= George Mason (disambiguation) =

George Mason IV (1725–1792) was an early American planter, statesman, and a Founding Father of the United States. He is the most famous member of the Mason family.

George Mason may also refer to:

== Arts and entertainment ==
- George Mason (writer) (1735–1806), English writer and book collector
- George Hemming Mason (1818–1872), English landscape artist
- George Champlin Mason Sr. (1820–1894), American architect
- George Birkbeck Mason (1828–1899), Australian dance musician and theatre founder
- George Champlin Mason Jr. (1849–1924), American architectural preservationist
- George D. Mason (1856–1948), American architect in Detroit, Michigan
- George Mason (actor) (born 1991/1992), New Zealand actor

== Law and politics ==
- George Mason I (1629–1686), early American colonist and statesman
- George Mason II (1660–1716), early American planter and statesman
- George Mason III (1690–1735), early American planter and statesman, father of George Mason IV
- George Mason (Norfolk burgess) (?-1710), early American statesman

== Sports ==
- George Mason (racing driver) (1890–1918), American racing driver
- George Mason (footballer, born 1896) (1896–1987), English footballer for Leeds United
- George Mason (footballer, born 1913) (1913–1993), English footballer for Coventry City
- George Mason (rugby league) (died 1996), Australian rugby league footballer and coach

== Others ==
- George Mason (priest) (died 1562), Canon of Windsor
- George Mason (bishop) (1729–1783), Anglican clergyman
- George Mason V (1753–1796), American planter and militiaman
- George Thomson Mason (1818–1846), U.S. Army Second Lieutenant in the Mexican–American War
- George W. Mason (1891–1954), American automobile industry executive
- George Mason (philanthropist) (1930–2024), New Zealand botanist and philanthropist

== Other uses ==
- George Mason (24 character), fictional character in American television series 24
- George Mason, Virginia, census-designated place in Fairfax County, Virginia, USA
- George Mason University, public university in Fairfax County, Virginia

== See also ==
- George Mason Patriots, NCAA sports teams from George Mason University
- George Joseph Gustave Masson (1819–1888), English educationalist
