= Dennis Silk =

English cricketer and educator (1931–2019)

Personal information
- Full name: Dennis Raoul Whitehall Silk
- Born: 8 October 1931; Eureka, California, United States
- Died: 19 June 2019 (aged 87)
- Batting: Right-handed
- Role: Batsman

Domestic team information
- Years: Team
- 1952–1955: Cambridge University
- 1956–1960: Somerset

Career statistics
Competition	First-class
Matches	83
Runs scored	3,845
Batting average	29.80
100s/50s	7/19
Top score	126
Balls bowled	357
Wickets	1
Bowling average	240.00
5 wickets in innings	0
10 wickets in match	0
Best bowling	1/22
Catches/stumpings	45/–
- Source: Cricinfo, 15 June 2013

Dennis Raoul Whitehall Silk CBE (8 October 1931 – 19 June 2019) was an English first-class cricketer and a public school headmaster, as Warden of Radley College, from 1968 to 1991. He was a close friend of the poet Siegfried Sassoon, of whom he spoke and wrote extensively. In the 1990s he chaired the Test and County Cricket Board.

== Early life and cricket ==
Silk was born in Eureka, California. His father was a medical missionary on a Native American reservation in the Sierra Nevada desert. Silk's mother, who was Spanish, died when he was five, and the family returned to Britain.

Silk was educated at Christ's Hospital and Sidney Sussex College, Cambridge, where he gained an MA in history and represented Cambridge University at cricket and at rugby. A useful opener or middle-order batsman, he scored centuries in matches against Oxford University in 1953 and 1954, and captained Cambridge University in 1955. He went on to play first-class cricket for Somerset as an amateur during the school summer holidays, but gave priority to his teaching career. His highest first-class score was 126 for Cambridge University against the Marylebone Cricket Club (MCC) in 1953.

Silk toured East Africa with the MCC in 1957–58 and captained the MCC on tours to South America in 1958–59 and to the US and Canada in 1959 and 1967, although none included first-class matches. He also captained a strong MCC team on a tour of New Zealand in 1960–61, which included 10 first-class matches, three of them against the full-strength New Zealand team. After the New Zealand tour he retired from first-class cricket at the age of 29.

Silk seldom bowled his leg-breaks, and his single first-class wicket came in his second-to-last match, when he bowled Gerry Alexander in the MCC match against the Governor-General's XI in Auckland. However, on the MCC tour of South America in 1959 he took nine wickets at an average of only 2.11, as well as scoring 457 runs at an average of 76.16. He later wrote two instruction books on playing cricket.

Silk chaired the Test and County Cricket Board from 1994 to 1996 and also served as President of the MCC. He was an honorary life vice-president of the MCC from 2000 onwards. He was made a CBE in the 1995 New Year's Honours List for services to cricket and education.

== Teaching ==
Having taught at Marlborough College, Silk moved on to Radley College, where he was Warden (headmaster) from 1968 to 1991. In this role he appeared prominently in the 1980 BBC documentary series, Public School. Eric Anderson, who headed Shrewsbury (1975–1980) and Eton (1980–1994), regarded Silk as the best headmaster of his generation in England, for transforming Radley from what Anderson described as "a pretty ordinary place" to one of England's best public schools.

Several of Silk's eminent past pupils have written about him in their memoirs, including Sir Andrew Motion, who said of Silk that he "made the school more like a family". Oliver Popplewell wrote that his sons Nigel and Andrew "thrived" at Radley under Silk. He also advised author Jilly Cooper on school life as part of her research for the novel Wicked!.

When Silk retired from Radley, he preferred not to accept any retirement gifts for himself, but instead established the Dennis Silk Fund to support the education of talented boys, whose parents might otherwise have struggled to pay the school's fees. As of 2018, 31 boys had benefited from the fund.

== Friendship with Sassoon ==
During the early 1950s, Silk was introduced to the cricket-loving poet Siegfried Sassoon by a mutual acquaintance, Edmund Blunden. Until Sassoon's death in 1967, Silk was one of his closest friends, and made several unique recordings of the poet reading his own work at Sassoon's home in Heytesbury, Wiltshire. These formed the basis of a BBC Radio 4 programme on the subject: Siegfried Sassoon: a Friend. In 2009, Silk became president for life of the Siegfried Sassoon Fellowship.

In 2014, Silk and his wife, Diana (who also knew Siegfried Sassoon well), appeared on the BBC programme Countryfile in a feature on Sassoon's residence at Heytesbury.

The cricket writer David Foot likened Silk to Sassoon, describing him as "a gentle, rounded, civilised man, a scholar without ostentation, literate, a lover of poetry and someone with a similar sense of quiet fun".

== Portrait bust ==
Dennis Silk sat for the sculptor and former Radley College pupil Alan Thornhill, for a portrait in clay. The correspondence file relating to the Silk portrait bust is held as part of the Thornhill Papers (2006:56) in the archive of the Henry Moore Foundation's Henry Moore Institute in Leeds, while the terracotta remains in the collection of the artist.

== Personal life ==
Silk married Diana Milton in Pitminster Church in Somerset in 1963. They had four children. They moved back to Somerset after his retirement settling in Stoke St Gregory.

Dennis Silk's death was marked by a Service of Thanksgiving held in Southwark Cathedral; 1,200 people attended, with representatives from Radley, Marlborough and the MCC. His wife Diana died on 19 January 2024, aged 88.

== Works ==
- Cricket (Hart-Davis, 1964)
- Attacking Cricket (Pelham, 1965)
- Siegfried Sassoon (Guinness lecture) (Michael Russell, 1975)
- T. E. Lawrence and Siegfried Sassoon: a Friendship (Reading Room Press, 2010)

== Bibliography ==
- Siegfried's Journal (journal of the Siegfried Sassoon Fellowship) – No. 10
