= Lulu Popplewell =

British actress

- Born: Laura Francesca Popplewell; 15 January 1991 (age 35); London, England
- Occupations: Actress; comedian
- Years active: 2001–present
- Father: Sir Andrew Popplewell
- Relatives: Anna Popplewell (sister); Nigel Popplewell (uncle); Sir Oliver Popplewell (grandfather)

Lulu Bird Popplewell (born Laura Francesca Popplewell; 15 January 1991) is an English comedian and actress.

She was a finalist in the Leicester Square New Comedian of the Year Award and the Chortle Student Comedy Award 2018.

She is the daughter of Lord Justice Sir Andrew Popplewell and his wife, Debra Lomas, a dermatologist. She is the younger sister of actress Anna Popplewell and the older sister of Freddie Popplewell, the niece of former cricketer Nigel Popplewell, and the granddaughter of the late Sir Oliver Popplewell, a former judge.

Popplewell was originally known for her role as Daisy in the 2003 film Love Actually. On radio, she played the part of Lyra Belacqua in BBC Radio 4's 2003 dramatisation of Philip Pullman's His Dark Materials trilogy.

== Filmography ==
Filmography
Year	Title	Role	Notes
2001	Love in a Cold Climate	Emma	TV miniseries
2003	Love Actually	Daisy	
