= Robert Dalley-Scarlett =

Australian organist, and choirmaster

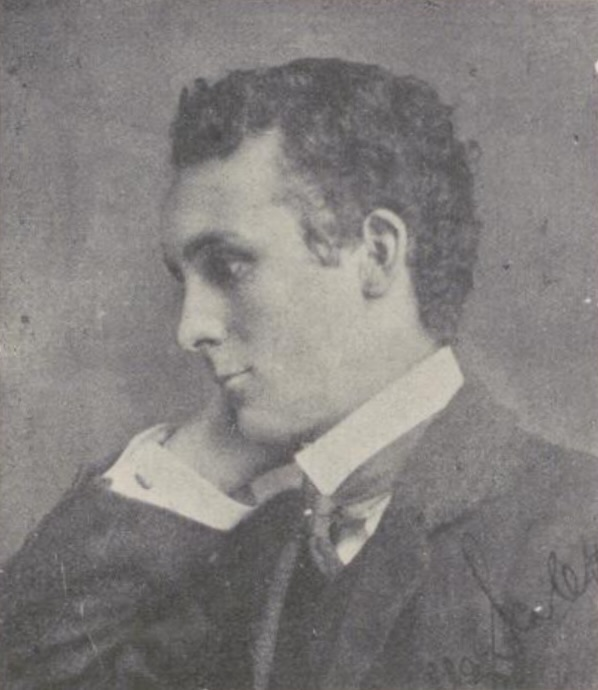
Robert Dalley-Scarlett in 1910

Dr. Robert Dalley-Scarlett (16 April 1887 – 31 July 1959) was an Australian organist, choirmaster, composer and musicologist.

== History ==
Dalley-Scarlett was born Robert Scarlett in Darlinghurst, New South Wales, a son of Robert Campbell Scarlett and his wife Emily Florence Scarlett, née Hancock. The name "Dalley" was added in tribute to his godfather, William Bede Dalley and hyphenated later. He was educated at the Superior Public School, Grafton and Sydney Grammar School and studied piano under S. (Sydney) Gordon Lavers (c. 1865–1940) and organ under Arthur Mason, organist of St James' Church, Sydney 1898–1907, City Organist 1901–1907, and music correspondent for The Sydney Morning Herald.

After several years taking occasional positions as church organist, he was in 1912 appointed organist and choral conductor to Christ Church Anglican Cathedral, Grafton.

He married Gertrude Alice Peir (1886–1970) in Sydney in 1909; they had two sons.

He enlisted with the 1st AIF on 5 May 1916, was gassed in France, transferred to the Pay Corps, London, in February 1917, and returned to Australia where he was honorably discharged in December 1917. While in London, he studied church music under Sir Frederick Bridge and Sir Richard Terry.

On his return to Australia, he was offered the post of organist and choirmaster of St Andrew's Presbyterian Church, Brisbane, succeeding Victor Galway. His wife refused to leave Sydney and their marriage would later be annulled.

He matriculated in Brisbane in 1920, and enrolled as an external student with the Elder Conservatorium, University of Adelaide, where he completed his Mus. Bac. degree in 1926 and Mus. Doc. in 1934, the first Queensland musician to be so qualified.

Dalley-Scarlett served with St. Andrew's Church from 1919 to 1932. He also conducted:

- South Brisbane City Choir 1920–1925.
- The University of Queensland Musical Society 1920–1930 and 1938–1941. The University choir gave a Bach festival in 1930.
- The Valley Methodist Church choir 1932–1934
- All Saints' Church choir 1934–1941

He founded and conducted the Brisbane Handel Society 1932–1959. They performed at Handel festivals in 1933 and 1934, and broadcast all his oratorios between 1934 and 1942. They gave annual unabridged, historically accurate, performances of Messiah in the 1950s.

He gained further qualifications and distinctions:

- Licentiate of the Associated Boards, 1922
- Licentiate of Music (Australia), 1924
- Fellow of Trinity College, London, 1924
- He was a founding member of the Music Teachers' Association of Queensland, and its president in 1935.
- He was an active member of Queensland University's Music Advisory Board 1924–1937.
- He was a founder of the Queensland Guild of Composers, and their president 1940–1953.

He privately taught piano, organ, singing, harmony and composition until 1941; his pupils included Hugh Brandon and Herbert Cannon.

From 1941 to 1955 Dalley-Scarlett was employed full time by the Australian Broadcasting Commission as music presentation officer, producing many broadcasts himself with the ABC Brisbane Singers. One programme, of English coronation music, was in 1953 broadcast world-wide by the British Broadcasting Corporation. Dalley-Scarlett made a programme of recordings to celebrate Queen Elizabeth II's coronation, collaborating with his Adelaide counterpart Norman Chinner.

He died at his home of a heart attack and was cremated.

== Compositions ==
Dalley-Scarlett was a prolific composer; many of his 300 works were broadcast or performed locally, although few were published.

== Scholarship ==
Dalley-Scarlett amassed a valuable library of some 5,000 items, including nearly 150 priceless first editions of George Frideric Handel and other eighteenth-century composers, which he used to inform his arrangements, now held by the Fisher Library, University of Sydney.

He was a prolific writer for musical journals, and acted as music critic for the Australian Musical News 1934–1937 and the Brisbane Courier Mail 1945–1946 and 1952–1959, but his most lasting literary contributions were the article on Australia for Grove's Dictionary (5th edition) and an article on eighteenth century performance entitled Handel's 'Messiah': How Can We Realise the Composer's Intentions?

== Recognition ==
A triennial scholarship dedicated to his memory was inaugurated by the University of Queensland.

== Family ==
Dalley-Scarlett married Gertrude Alice Peir (1886–1970) in Sydney on 8 September 1909. They had two sons:

- Grahame Yorke Dalley-Scarlett (born 8 July 1910) married Joyce Melville in 1939
- Hubert St. Pierre Bach Scarlett (born 29 March 1914) was appointed Sergeant-at-Arms of the Legislative Council in 1954.

They separated when he moved to Brisbane; the marriage was annulled in 1930. He married again on 11 March 1930, to singer and music copyist Joyce Buckham. He had no further children.
