= Winifred Purnell =

Australian-born pianist

Winifred Purnell (born 1893) was an Australian-born pianist in England.

== History ==
Winifred was the only daughter of Edward Purnell (c. 1853 – 22 February 1899) and Edith Morland Purnell, née Webb (3 November 1868 – 19 November 1950) who married in 1888. She had three brothers: Edward, Reginald (1890) and Cecil (1894). They had a home at Hill Street, Leichhardt, a suburb of Sydney.

She took lessons with Arthur Mason, Sydney's City Organist, and during this period acted as accompanist to the Sydney Choristers at the Sydney Town Hall. and gave concerts at the YMCA Hall

In 1908 she became a protégée of Mrs Arthur Popplewell (the soprano Rosa Bird), who took her to Hanover, Germany, and to London. She later had financial support from Sir Robert and Lady Lucas Tooth.

In 1912 Purnell and young Australian violinist Godfrey Ludlow gave a command performance at Buckingham Palace for Queen Mary. In 1913 her mother joined her in London.

During the Great War she crossed the Channel nine times, giving concerts for the troops in England, France and Belgium.

In May 1939 she returned to Australia, to visit her mother and to give a ten-week concert tour of Australia for the ABC.
