= Arthur John Mason =

Australian organist and journalist

Arthur John Mason (17 September 1869 – 2 December 1946) was an Australian organist and journalist, remembered as Sydney City Organist from 1901 to 1907, when he moved to London as correspondent for the Sydney Morning Herald. He was a son of George Birkbeck Mason (29 October 1828 – 2 October 1899), musician and entrepreneur, and grandson of Abraham John Mason (1 January 1794 – 18 August 1858), wood engraver of London and New York.

== Arthur Mason ==
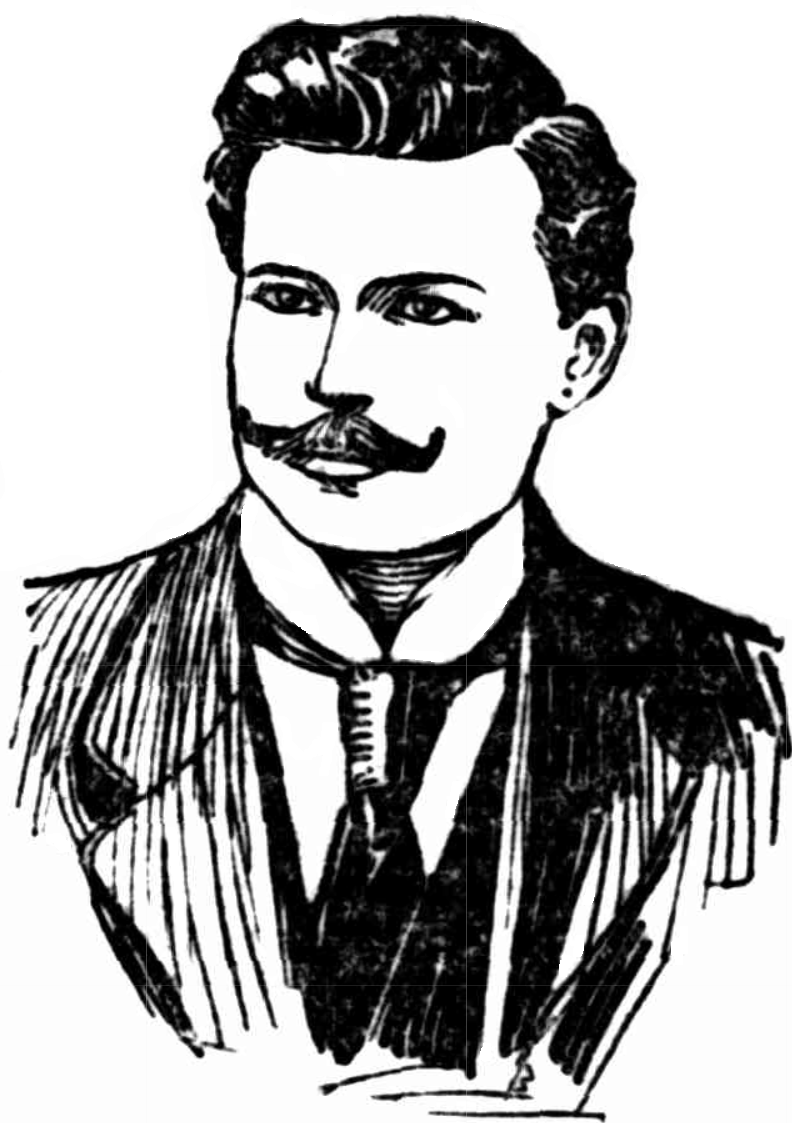
Arthur Mason

Mason was born in either Gympie or Maryborough, Queensland, the second son of dance master and musician George Birkbeck Mason (29 October 1828 – 2 October 1899) and Margaret Kate Mason, née Tomlins (c. 1830 – 29 May 1896), who married in Sydney on 17 July 1852.

Mason grew up in Sydney, and had some musical training from his father, and at an early age became a chorister of St Andrew's Cathedral. He became a pupil of choirmaster and organist Montague Younger and eventually his deputy, frequently presiding at the cathedral organ. He passed the Trinity College senior examination with honors in 1889. Around the same time, at age 13, he passed the entrance examination for the New South Wales public service and became a clerk, remaining in the service for 17 years, part at least in the Education Department. He gained further experience as organist of St John's and St Thomas's churches in Balmain and served as honorary pianist to the Metropolitan Liedertafel, and was organist of St Thomas's, Balmain when he was appointed organist and choirmaster of the elegant and cultured Trinity Congregational Church, Strathfield, in July 1892. His next appointment was as organist and choirmaster at St James's (Anglican) Church, King Street in 1898. He was still employed as a public service clerk in 1901 when he was appointed Sydney's City Organist for a period of one year, some 18 months after the departure of the Belgian Auguste Wiegand (died 1904). In the interim several musicians had filled the vacancy, one being T. H. Massey. On 10 December 1902 the appointment was extended for another two years at an annual salary of £300.

While City Organist, Mason was able to take students, notably Robert Dalley-Scarlett and Winifred Purnell. He also contributed articles and critiques on musical subjects to the Sydney Morning Herald . In March 1906 he took a six-month holiday in London, and while there wrote extensively for the Herald, leading to his appointment as that newspaper's London correspondent. He resigned as City Organist in June 1907, was given a mayoral reception on 26 July and the family left for London by the Wakool on the 27th.

Mason made several successful public appearances in London: a Sunday concert at the Albert Hall, which led to an invitation to head a production of Widor's symphony for organ and orchestra at the Queen's Hall with the LSO, conducted by the composer himself.

He returned with his family to Sydney on 28 November 1910, to act as leader writer for the Herald. One of his first musical assignments was to play the Wedding March for George Allman, who had succeeded him at St James's Church. In February 2011 he returned to the Town Hall organ to play in a benefit concert for the widows of the Coogee surf disaster and the heroes Harald Baker and James Clarken.

=== London ===
Mason and family returned to London by the Scharnhorst in February 1913. Before leaving, he held a farewell concert at the Sydney Town Hall, where he played "A Venetian Serenade", an original composition. He was again treated to a mayoral function.

In 1921 his contract with the Herald ended, and he started work as publicity agent for Australia House, writing articles for the Australian press about items of interest in England and vice versa. Around this time he was also working as secretary for Federated British Music Industries.

In 1932 he became the Australian Broadcasting Commission (ABC)'s London agent, with a brief to identify radio plays and new music for rebroadcast in Australia, also to arrange tours of Australia by notable musicians. During the bombing of London he served as London correspondent for the ABC.

In 1932 or 1933 he was appointed organist to St James's Church, Piccadilly (also known as St James's Church, Westminster, and St James-in-the-Fields) and held that post until 1940, when the building sustained heavy damage from a German bomb.

He presided at the St Martins-in-the-Fields organ for the Anzac Day service in 1942 and the Australia Day service 26 January 1944.

He was injured in a German V-1 flying bomb blast while working as an ABC correspondent.

He died in London on 2 December 1946, aged 70.

=== Town Hall Recitals ===
Mason's first recital at the Sydney Town Hall stood out from those of his predecessor Wiegand, in being somewhat more serious, a fact not lost on Sydney's music-loving public. The Sydney Morning Herald reviewer declared, perhaps with some relief:

It is recognized on all hands that the existence of the noble instrument which adds much dignity to our Town Hall is mainly due to the fact that it supplies an educational want, for musical culture is a necessary portion of every educational system. It is, therefore, pleasing to observe that in his first programme Mr Mason, whilst presenting compositions in such variety of styles that all present must have found something to their taste, also introduced several classical numbers which, to the student, were as interesting as they were instructive.

The programme was:

- Toccata and Fugue in D minor - J. S. Bach
- Communion in F - Grison
- Souvenir Gavotte - Zelman
- Operatic Fantasia, Carmen - Bizet
- March in F - Guilmant
- The Question, The Answer - Wolstenholme
- Fantasia on British Airs - Mason
- Salut d'Amour - Elgar
- Hungarian March, 'Rákóczi March' - Liszt

Transcriptions from opera were popular, and gave Mason the opportunity to present some challenging "new" work, such as excerpts from Wagner's Ring cycle.

A controversial innovation was Sunday concerts — to propitiate Sydney's more earnest churchgoers and officials, all works played were of the "sacred" genre, the concerts were held in the afternoon (when few church services were held), no soloists were engaged, and admission was free.

His first Sunday concert consisted of:

- 'The Heavens are Telling' - Haydn
- 'Ave Maria' - Schubert
- La Carita - Rossini
- March of the Israelites - Costa
- Fantasia on Hymn Tunes - Mason
- Sicilian Mariner - Lux
- Oh, Rest in the Lord - Mendelssohn
- Grand Solemn March - Henry Smart

=== Some organs played by Mason ===
St. John's, Balmain

- Arthur Mason 1889

St Thomas's, Balmain

- Arthur Mason 1890 to 1892
- S. Gordon Lavers
- Francis Martin
- George C. Boulton c. 1902 to 1924 or later

Trinity Congregational Church, Strathfield

- Arthur Mason 1893 to 1896
- E. G. Turner 1926
- G. H. Turner 1933
- Charles Tuckwell 1937

St James' Church, Sydney

- Arthur Mason 1897 to 1907
- George Faunce Allman (27 December 1883 – 16 February 1967) 1907 to 1961
- Field

Sydney Town Hall Grand Organ

- Auguste Wiegand (1849–1904) 1891 to 1900
- Arthur Mason 1901 to 1907
- Ernest Edwin Philip Truman (1869–1948) 1909 to 1935
- — not filled — 1935 to 1978
- Robert Ampt ( – ) 1978 to (current)

St James's Church, Piccadilly (Note: The church, attributed to Christopher Wren, was largely destroyed by German bombers in November 1940.)

- Raphael Courteville (c. 1675–1735) 1691 to c. 1735
- Leopold Stokowski (1882–1977) 1902 to
- Arthur Mason 1932 to 1940

== Family ==
Abraham John Mason (1 January 1794 – 18 August 1858), wood engraver of London and New York, was married to Robinianna Mason (c. 1791 – 11 June 1881) They followed their sons to Sydney in 1856; he died two years later, at Newtown, Sydney. She died at the home of their son George B. Mason. Their family included: (Note: Cyrus Mason (1830 or 1829 – 8 August 1915), lithographer, author of The Australian Christmas Story Book (1871), was not closely related. He was a son of John and Jane Mason, née Browning, arrived in Melbourne aboard James L. Bogart in April 1853; and married Jessie Montagu (died 21 November 1909) on 16 June 1853. their son Arthur J. Mason was an engineer.)

- Walter George Mason (1820 – 12 March 1866) was born in London, and was taught art of wood engraving by his father while the family was in New York in the 1930s. He received further training under G. Bonner, worked for The Illustrated London News, Punch and other pictorial magazines. He followed his brothers George and Charles to Australia aboard Windsor, arriving November 1852 with his wife Eliza Mason, née Whiteman (died 1854), and four sons. He worked for Sydney Punch and The Illustrated Sydney News, which he co-founded. He married again, to Jane Mary Theresa Brady on 15 September 1859.

- second son Edward Mason (7 March 1845 – 1923) married Sarah Minell on 9 October 1869. She died 30 March 1870 aged 20. He married again, to Margaretta Bourne "Margaret" Chisholm (6 October 1849 – 7 February 1921) on 2 April 1875. He worked for The Bulletin from 1880.
- Frederick W. Mason
- Robinianna E. Mason (1860 – 19 January 1907)

- George Birkbeck Mason (29 October 1828 – 2 October 1899) married Margaret Kate Tomlins (c. 1830 – 29 May 1896) at St James' Church, Sydney on 17 July 1852. They had a home at Talford Street, Lyndhurst, New South Wales in 1876–78; 472 Crown Street, Surry Hills in 1896. Their children include:

- Ernest Sydney Mason (c. 1861 – 28 June 1901)
- Selina Ann Mason (c. 1864 – 5 November 1930) married Christopher Wren, lived at Glebe, then "Wren's Nest", Trafalgar Street, Annandale.
- Arthur John Mason (17 September 1869 – 2 December 1946) married Mary Fletcher Earnshaw (1867– ) on 25 March 1891. Their last residence in Sydney was "Hinemoa", Raglan Street, Mosman.

- Maie Mason was mezzo-soprano, studied singing in Paris in the 1920s.
- Marguerite Mason, his younger daughter, studied acting in London.
- Another daughter may have been born at Burwood on 13 October 1894.
- son 6 August 1903

- Clarence Wilmott Mason (c. 1872 – 25 May 1925), baritone and actor, shared the stage name "Charles Howard" with his uncle. He married Eliza Childs (1878 – 17 January 1915).
- Mabella Maud Mason (c. February 1876 – 8 October 1876)

- Charles Voelker Mason (c. 1826 – 29 July 1881) was a stage comic and theatrical agent known as "Charles V. Howard". His last residence was at Birchgrove Road, Balmain. He was married to Annie Mason (died 14 June 1894 at Grove Street, Balmain). Fredrick (or Frederick) C. Howard was a son.
