= Theatre Royal, Brisbane =

Former theatre in Queensland, Australia

Coordinates: 27.4705°S 153.0257°E

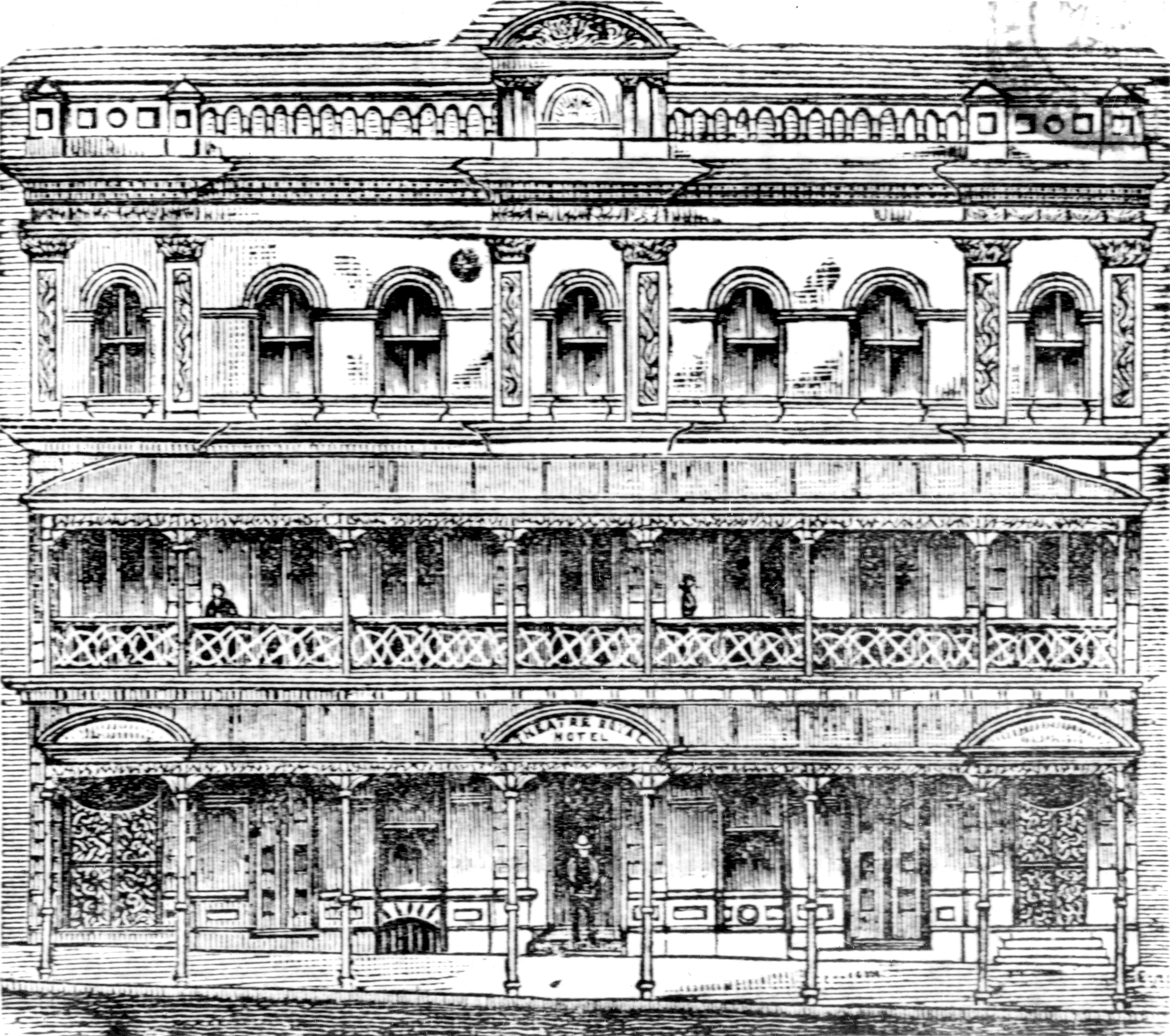
Architectural drawing of the facade of Theatre Royal Brisbane, 1891

The Theatre Royal was the second dedicated theatre built in Brisbane, Queensland, Australia. It opened in 1881 and was designed by Andrea Stombuco. The first venue on the same site was Mason's Concert [or Music] Hall (1865), which had been designed by William (Billy) Coote and constructed by John Bourne. Local press at the time suggested Mason's hall could seat 500 patrons.

== History ==
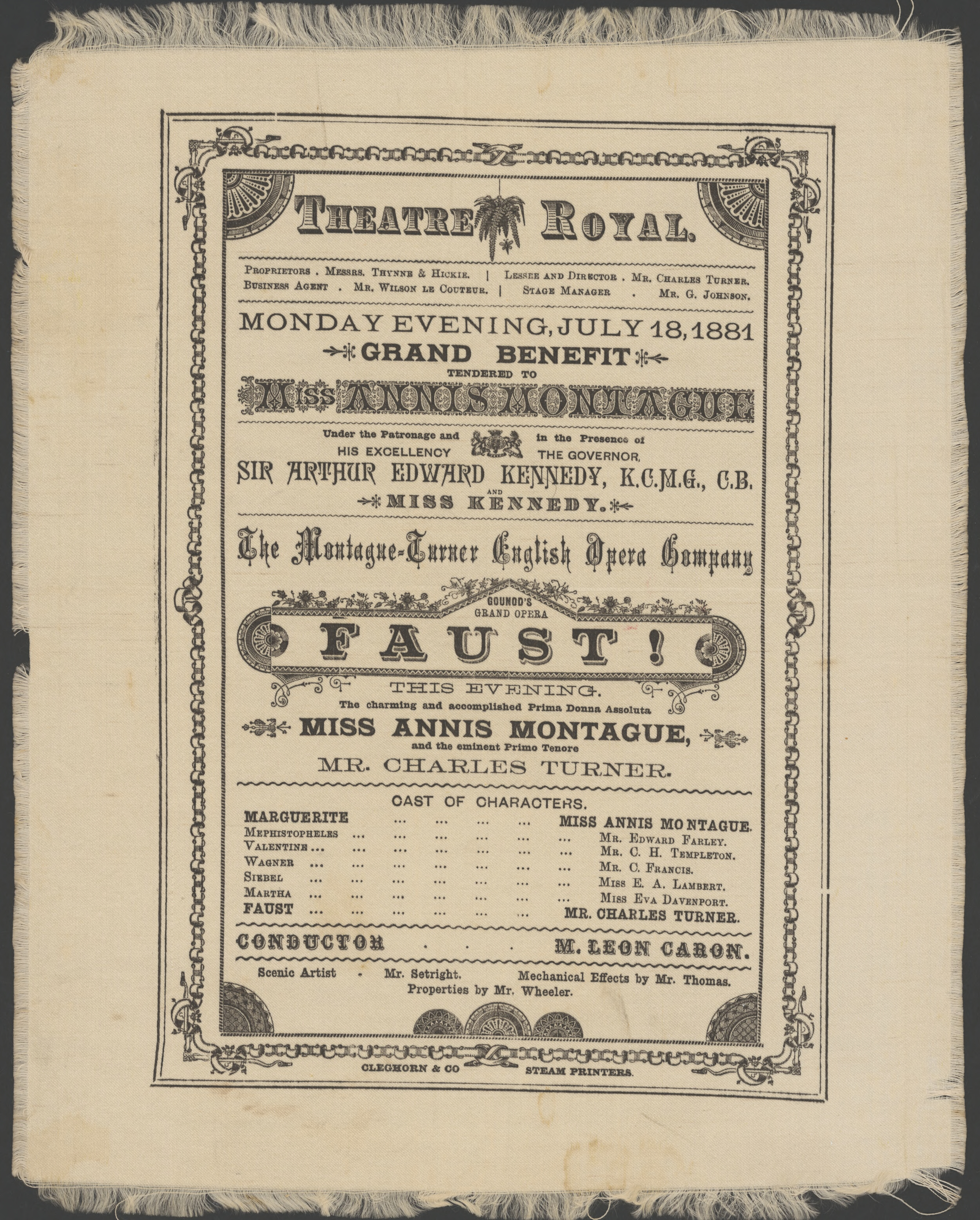
Advertisement for a Theatre Royal performance of the opera Faust, 1881

Brisbane's first licensed theatre was opened at 80 Elizabeth Street by George Birkbeck Mason in 1865 and eventually named the Victoria Theatre. It was closed in 1880 and rebuilt, opening on 18 April 1881 as the Theatre Royal. It was again remodelled in 1911 when electric lights were installed.

In 1940 it was again renovated and the theatre was occupied by U.S. Army from 1942 to 1945. A small number of revues for American servicemen were offered during this time. It resumed its life as a theatre following the war.

From 1949 to 1959, comedian George Wallace Jnr presented weekly variety shows at the Theatre Royal. Early shows featured an all male, ex-army revue company called the Kangaroos. A ballet and showgirls were eventually added to the show to broaden its audience appeal. The female performers began to be called the “Royal Showgirls” and were dressed in bikinis, mini-skirts and shorts. The shows were vaudeville or burlesque in style and featured titles which implied nudity. The shows attracted a wide cross section of the Brisbane population to what was described as the ‘Brisbane Folies Bergere’.

Following the introduction of television to Brisbane in 1957, Wallace transferred his variety show to a TV format and attendance at the Theatre Royal shows began to decline. Nudity was promoted to improve audience numbers but by 1959 the theatre was compelled to close. The Queensland Symphony Orchestra and Queensland Theatre Company later used it. It was operated as a nightclub, Swizzles in the 1980s before being demolished in 1987 to make way for the Myer Centre complex development in 1987.

== Interior ==
The theatre could seat 1,350 people, with 350 in the dress circle, 250 in the stalls and 750 in the pit. It was designed by Andrea Strombuco who had also designed Her Majesty's Theatre. It had a private refreshment room for the dress circle patrons and a smoking room.

== Decoration ==
Its proscenium had gold Corinthian columns. The horse shoe shape of the dress circle obscured side views of the stage. After the 1911 refurbishment, the interior was marked by salmon pink, green and cream accents. Seating and ventilation was improved along with the installation of a sliding roof.

== Archived programs ==
Programs from the Theatre Royal are held in the State Library of Queensland and Queensland Performing Arts Centre Museum. Selected programs are also held in the University of Queensland Fryer Library.
