= Anna Popplewell =

English actress (born 1988)

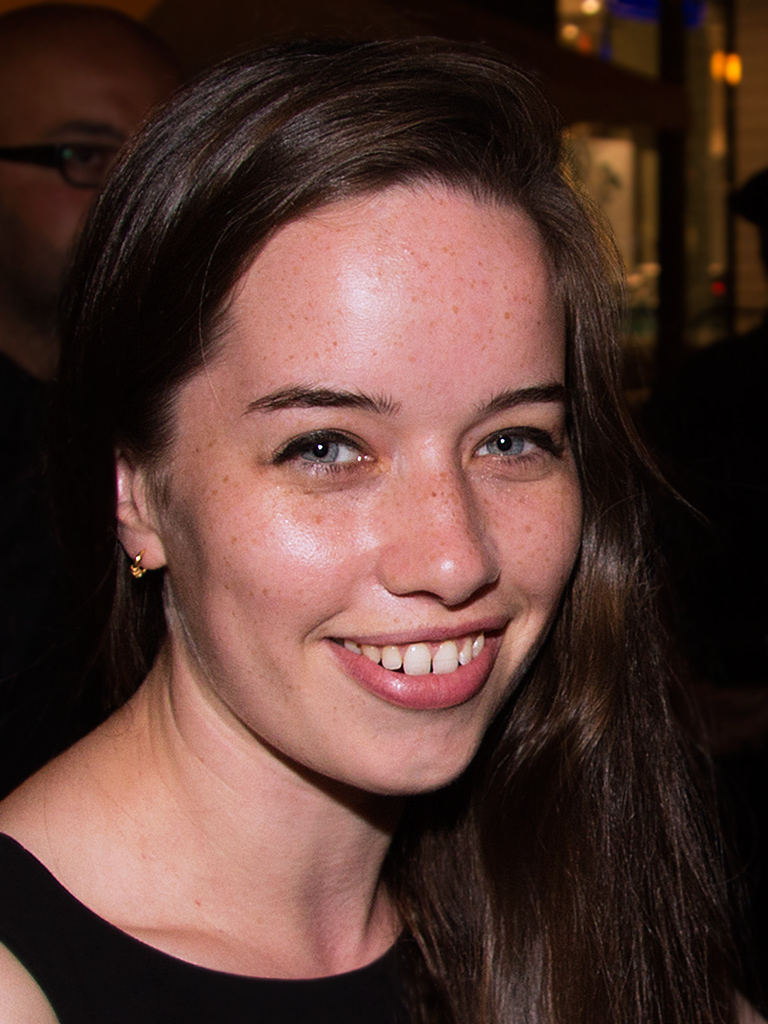
- Popplewell in 2013
- Born: 16 December 1988 (age 37); London, England
- Education: Magdalen College, Oxford (BA)
- Occupation: Actress
- Years active: 1998–present
- Spouse: Sam Caird (m. 2016)
- Children: 2
- Father: Andrew Popplewell
- Relatives: Lulu Popplewell (sister); Nigel Popplewell (uncle); Oliver Popplewell (grandfather)

Anna Popplewell (born 16 December 1988) is an English actress. She is known for portraying Susan Pevensie in The Chronicles of Narnia trilogy (2005–2010), which grossed over $1.5 billion worldwide and earned her a number of awards.

Popplewell began her career with minor roles, including the drama films Mansfield Park (1999) and Girl with a Pearl Earring (2003). She went on to play starring roles in the web series Halo 4: Forward Unto Dawn (2012) and the historical drama series Reign (2013–2017). Following a series of independent film roles, she appeared in the horror film The Nun II (2023). Also in 2023, she made her stage debut as the title character in Hedda Gabler.

== Early life and education ==
Popplewell, the eldest of three children, is the daughter of Lord Justice Sir Andrew Popplewell, a Court of Appeal judge, and Debra Lomas, a dermatologist who studied at Newnham College, Cambridge. She was born in London. Her siblings are Lulu and Freddie. Her paternal grandfather, Sir Oliver Popplewell, is a former judge, and her uncle, Nigel Popplewell, is a noteworthy former cricketer.

Popplewell attended North London Collegiate School, and was admitted to Oxford University in 2007 where she studied English at Magdalen College.

== Career ==
Popplewell began acting at the age of six, taking classes at the Allsorts Drama School. She began acting professionally in the TV production Frenchman's Creek in 1998. She made her film debut in 1999 in the film Mansfield Park, and followed up with supporting roles in the films The Little Vampire (2000) and Girl with a Pearl Earring (2003), with Scarlett Johansson. In 2001, she appeared as Victoria in the BBC serial Love in a Cold Climate.

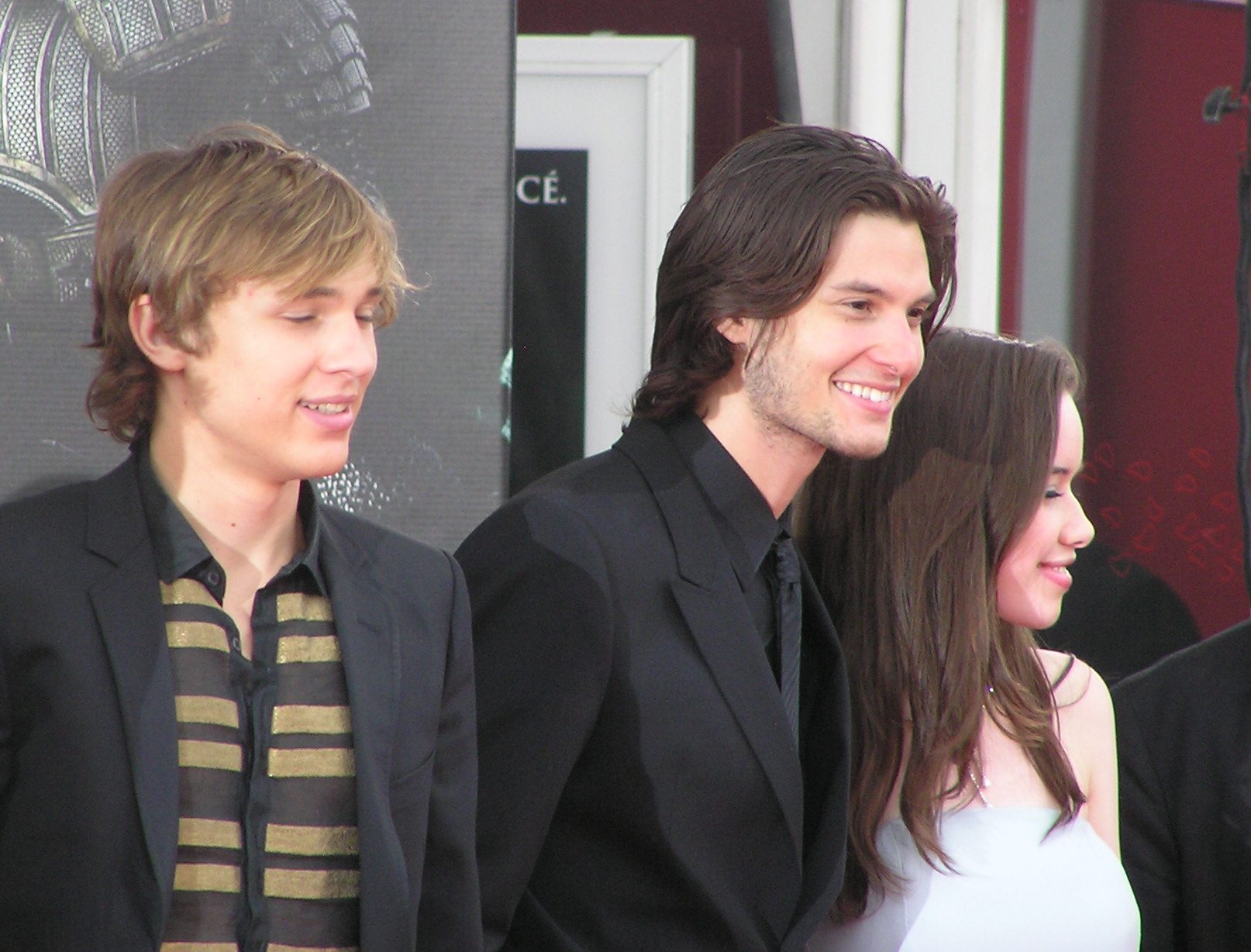
Popplewell (right) with William Moseley (left) and Ben Barnes (middle) at the premiere of The Chronicles of Narnia: Prince Caspian in 2008.

Popplewell's first major role was in the film The Chronicles of Narnia: The Lion, the Witch and the Wardrobe (2005), where she played Susan Pevensie at the age of 16. She has a fear of mice, requiring a double to undertake part of her scene at the Stone Table. The film emerged as a blockbuster, and earned acclaim from critics and audiences. She reprised her role in the sequel, The Chronicles of Narnia: Prince Caspian (2008), in which she acted with William Moseley, Skandar Keynes, Georgie Henley and Ben Barnes. She also made a cameo appearance in the third Narnia film, The Chronicles of Narnia: The Voyage of the Dawn Treader (2010). Collectively, the films have grossed over $1.5 billion worldwide.

In 2012, Popplewell played the character Chyler Silva in the live action 5-part mini series Halo 4: Forward Unto Dawn. In 2013, she began playing Lola, a friend of Mary, Queen of Scots, in the CW television series Reign. Filming took place in Ireland and Canada. She played the role until 2016.

Since 2018, Popplewell has narrated the audiobooks Dear Mrs. Bird and its sequels Yours, Cheerfully and Mrs. Porter Calling for Simon & Schuster Audio; London's Number One Dog-Walking Agency, for HarperAudio; Queen of Coin and Whispers for Bolinda Publishing Pty Ltd; Jane Eyre for Penguin Audio; Everything is Lies for Michael Joseph Publishers; and her grandfather Sir Oliver Popplewell's novel, The Prime Minister and His Mistress, for Lulu Publishing Services.

In 2023, Popplewell played Kate in the horror film The Nun II, which was a commercial success. Writing for Forbes, Simon Thompson praised her return, calling Popplewell a "familiar and welcome face in the cast". Alison Foreman of IndieWire described her as "especially warm" and "easy-to-root-for". Also in 2023, she made her stage debut playing the titular role in the play Hedda Gabler.

== Personal life ==
Popplewell married Sam Caird in 2016. The couple have two children.

== Filmography ==
=== Film ===
Anna Popplewell film performances
Year	Title	Role	Notes
1999	Mansfield Park	Betsey	
2000	The Little Vampire	Anna Sackville-Bagg	
2001	Me Without You	Young Marina	
2002	Thunderpants	Denise Smash	
2003	Girl with a Pearl Earring	Maertge	
2005	The Chronicles of Narnia: The Lion, the Witch and the Wardrobe	Susan Pevensie	
2008	The Chronicles of Narnia: Prince Caspian	Susan Pevensie	
2010	The Chronicles of Narnia: The Voyage of the Dawn Treader	Susan Pevensie	
2012	Payback Season	Izzy Jacobs	
2015	Freak of Nurture	Nurse Bethany Lane	
2017	The Last Birthday	Grand Duchess Olga Nikolaevna of Russia	Short
2019	You Are Here	Tanya	
2022	Catch the Wind	Frankie	
2022	The Gallery	Morgan/Dorian	Interactive film
2023	The Nun II	Kate	
2024	Plastic Surgery	Dr. Terra	Short
2026	The Country	Sister Helen	Short

=== Television ===
Anna Popplewell television performances
Year	Title	Role	Notes
1998	Frenchman's Creek	Henrietta	Television film
2000	Dirty Tricks	Rebecca	Television film
2001	Love in a Cold Climate	Victoria	Miniseries
2002	Daniel Deronda	Fanny Davilow	Miniseries
2011	Comedy Lab	Herself	Episode: "Totally Tom"
2011	Brave New World	Maura Taft	Television film
2012	Halo 4: Forward Unto Dawn	Chyler Silva	Web series; main role
2012	Looking Back	Herself	Short
2013‍–‍2016	Reign	Lady Lola Narcisse	Main role
2020	Prop Culture	Herself	"The Lion, Witch, and the Wardrobe"

=== Video games ===
Anna Popplewell video game performances
Year	Title	Role	Notes
2005	The Chronicles of Narnia: The Lion, the Witch and the Wardrobe	Susan Pevensie	
2008	The Chronicles of Narnia: Prince Caspian	Susan Pevensie	
2014	The Elder Scrolls Online		
2024	The Elder Scrolls Online: Gold Road		

=== Stage ===
Anna Popplewell stage performances
Year	Title	Role	Notes
2023	Hedda Gabler	Hedda Gabler	
2025	The Maids	Solange	
2025	The Wanderers	Julia	

=== Podcast ===
- The Left Right Game (2020)

== Awards and nominations ==
Year	Award	Category	Nominated work	Result	Ref.
2006	Teen Choice Awards	Choice Fantasy Movie Actress	The Lion, The Witch and The Wardrobe	Nominated	
2006	CAMIE Awards	—N/a	The Lion, The Witch and The Wardrobe	Won	
2008	Nickelodeon UK Kids' Choice Awards	Best Film Star	The Chronicles of Narnia: Prince Caspian	Nominated	
2009	Young Artist Awards	Best Performance in a Feature Film – Young Ensemble Cast	The Chronicles of Narnia: Prince Caspian	Nominated	
2012	Streamy Awards	Best Female Performance: Drama	Halo 4: Forward Unto Dawn	Nominated	
