= Rosa Bird =

Australian soprano

- In 1906
- Born: Josephine Sarah Jacombs; 11 December 1866
- Died: 1 February 1927 (aged 60); London, England
- Occupation: Soprano vocalist
- Spouse: Arthur Henry Popplewell (m. 1888; died 1894)
- Children: 2

Josephine Sarah Jacombs (11 December 1866 – 1 February 1927), also known by her stage name Rosa Bird, was an Australian soprano. She lived in Sydney before moving to London in 1895.

== Early life and education ==
Jacombs was born in 1966, the oldest of six children of Josephine Jacombs née Lane (died 1918) and William Thompson Jacombs (1830–1920), the head bookkeeper for Tooth's Brewery in Sydney. She grew up in Glebe, Sydney, where she studied piano and singing under Henri Kowalski.

== Career ==
In 1894, she made her first major public appearances, charity concerts at Petersham Town Hall on 15 January, and at the Sydney Town Hall on 2 February, on that occasion singing Ombre légère, the aria from Dinorah, for which an encore was called. On both occasions Kowalski served as her accompanist.

Her husband died in 1894, and the following year she moved to London, appearing at a farewell concert at the YMCA on 12 March 1895, and departing on the RMS Ophir 3 March. In London she studied under Henry Blower at the Royal College of Music, then briefly with Madame Marchesi. Around this time she adopted her stage name, "Rosa Bird". She made her London stage debut in a reception at the Albert Hall, for Lord Kitchener, on his return from the South African War.

After an absence of twelve years, she returned to Sydney on 20 January 1908, visiting her parents and her son at Kameruka estate. While in Sydney she heard the young pianist Winifred Purnell, and was so impressed that she brought her back to Hanover and London, persuading Sir Robert and Lady Lucas Tooth to sponsor her European studies.

In 1910, Jacombs had a residence "Lewgars" at Kingsbury, London. Aside from her concert appearances, often for charities, she also took students. She was active in London society, entertaining guests at her house in Hyde Park and her river house on the Thames. She socialised with novelists Maxwell Gray and Mary Elizabeth Braddon, and maintained friendships with Princess Henry of Battenberg and the Infanta of Spain.

During World War I, Jacombs turned her home at 1 Moreton Gardens into a hospital for Australian officers, and established an Australian Voluntary Hospital in Wimereux, France, with assistance from Lady Dudley, and largely financed by Sir Robert Lucas Tooth, who contributed £10,000 to open the hospital. The two hospitals were kept open with contributions from the Australian public before being taken over by the War Office. Jacombs ran the hospital with the assistance of her daughter Violet, with a matron and two nursing sisters in charge of V.A.D. nursing staff. For her services she was awarded the Croix de Guerre.

She died at Oriel Lawn, Hampton Court, on 1 February 1927.

== Personal life and family ==
Jacombs married Arthur Henry Popplewell (1861–1894), an accountant and organiser of church and charity concerts, on 18 April 1888 in Petersham, New South Wales. They had two children in the following three years:

- Violet May Popplewell OBE (27 January 1889 – 14 December 1959), a portrait painter, made an OBE for her patriotic and charitable work during World War I.
- Benjamin Thompson Popplewell (11 December 1890 – 29 May 1954) served with the Royal Australian Army Ordnance Corps and Royal Australian Electrical and Mechanical Engineers, and was promoted to Captain in 1942.
