= George Birkbeck Mason =

English-born Australian pianist and entrepreneur

George Birkbeck Mason (29 October 1828 – 2 October 1899), was an English-born Australian pianist, music and instruments retailer, dancing teacher and entrepreneur. He is perhaps best remembered as founder of Brisbane's first theatre, which eventually became the Theatre Royal, Brisbane. He was the father of organist Arthur John Mason.

== History ==
Mason was the second son of Abraham John Mason (1 January 1794 – 18 August 1858), wood engraver of London, in New York 1829–1839.

He arrived in Australia from London with his brother Charles Voelker Mason (c. 1825 – 29 July 1881) in 1849. They toured Australia 1850–1853 as "The Howards, Ethiopian Minstrels" (for which purpose he was "George Howard"), and published a "songster" of African-American folk songs. They also appeared with Blyth Waterland and James Reading as the "Ethiopian Serenaders", reckoned as the first such combination in Australia. From April to August 1857 he ran a dance academy in Ballarat, Victoria, hosting quadrille assemblies and teaching dance steps, for which ladies received free tuition. He moved to Sydney, where he advertised his services as a "quadrille pianist" at Stanley Street, Sydney, later at the "Sydney Music Hall", a shop at 360 George Street, "nearly opposite Wynyard Square", which became "Anderson's Music Warehouse", later F.& E. Cole's stationery shop. By August 1861 he had moved to Brisbane, and opened a shop "Brisbane Music Hall", on Queen Street, later of Edward Street. Mrs Mason and her sister (died October 1863) had opened a "School for Young Ladies" on Edward Street, but nothing further has been found. In March 1863 he took over Brisbane's Victoria Hotel, also on Queen Street, from Thomas S. Cowell, and built a concert hall adjacent on Elizabeth Street; after some delays, it opened on 25 January 1865 with an entertainment judged "below mediocre". More professional companies followed, but despite the Lyster Opera Company putting on a benefit performance of Flotow's Martha for the proprietor, he proved insolvent shortly after. Frank Howson's company was playing at the time. William Coote (died 1 October 1898) kept it, Brisbane's first purpose-built theatre, operating. (Note: From March 1866 it was known as the Victoria Concert Hall, though the old name persisted for some months. Nicknamed "The Longboat", in 1867 it was renamed the Royal Victoria Theatre in competition with the Royal Alexandra Theatre on Edward Street (opened in November 1866). In April 1874 it was reopened by Morton Tavares as The Queensland Theatre, and survived to 1880.)

Mason returned to taking music students and organising quadrille assemblies. In April 1866 he applied for the publican's licence for the Brighton Hotel at Brighton, Queensland, which he took over in June 1866, followed by the Kelvin Grove Hotel in February 1867. By April 1869 he was conducting dancing lessons and quadrille assemblies at the Masonic Hall, Gympie, also touting for business as draftsman and wood engraver. In January 1870 he took over the licence for the Sportsman's Arms Hotel in Gympie, but the transfer was cancelled a month later, as he had left for Maryborough, and taken the lease on that town's Theatre Royal.

While in Gympie he conducted dancing classes in a local school, and in this new location, he opened a dancing academy and founded a quadrille club.

Around 1872 the family moved to Sydney, where George Mason became publican of the Horse and Jockey Hotel, at the corner of Hunter and O'Connell streets), proved insolvent 1874. In 1881 he was living at 2 Nithsdale Street, Hyde Park, where his mother died in June. Five years later, when the bailiffs came for his possessions, he was living in Ultimo. He died at Thargomindah, Queensland, on 2 October 1899.

=== Compositions ===
George B. Mason wrote several songs:

- "Flag of the Southern Cross"
- "Welcome to 1882"

== Family ==
Mason married Margaret Kate Tomlins (c. 1830 – 29 May 1896) at St James' Church, Sydney on 17 July 1852. They had a home at Talford Street, Lyndhurst, New South Wales in 1876–78; 472 Crown Street, Surry Hills in 1896. Their children include:

- Ernest Sydney Mason (c. 1861 – 28 June 1901)
- Selina Ann Mason (c. 1864 – 5 November 1930) married Christopher Wren, lived at Glebe, then "Wren's Nest", Trafalgar Street, Annandale.
- Arthur John Mason (17 September 1869 – 2 December 1946) married Mary Fletcher Earnshaw (1867– ) on 25 March 1891. Their last residence in Sydney was "Hinemoa", Raglan Street, Mosman.
- Clarence Wilmott Mason (c. 1872 – 25 May 1925), baritone and actor, shared the stage name "Charles Howard" with his uncle. He married Eliza Childs (1878 – 17 January 1915).
- Mabella Maud Mason (c. February 1876 – 8 October 1876)

== See also ==
- Arthur John Mason § Family for more information on his immediate family and history
- George B. Mason and The Australian Home Companion and Band of Hope Journal
