= George Mason (footballer, born 1896) =

English footballer

Personal information
- Full name: George Mason
- Date of birth: 16 September 1896
- Place of birth: Church Gresley, England
- Date of death: July 1987 (aged 90)
- Place of death: Durham, England
- Height: 5 ft 8 in (1.73 m)
- Position: Right winger

Senior career*
Years	Team	Apps	(Gls)
- Frickley Colliery
1920–1923	Leeds United	65	(5)
1923–1924	Swindon Town	1	(0)
- Mexborough Athletic
Total		66	(5)
- * Club domestic league appearances and goals

George Mason (16 September 1896 – July 1987) was an English professional footballer who played as a right winger for Frickley Colliery, Leeds United, Swindon Town and Mexborough Athletic.
