= George Mason (writer) =

English writer and book collector

George Mason (1735 – 1806) was an English writer and book collector.

== Life ==
Mason was born in 1735 as the eldest son of John Mason (d. 1750), distiller, of Deptford Bridge. Later in life, having inherited ample means, he was enabled to collect some of the scarcest books in Greek, Latin, and English literature.

His main works are An Essay on Design in Gardening (1768) and A Supplement to Johnson's English Dictionary (1801).

Mason died unmarried at Aldenham Lodge, Hertfordshire on 4 Nov. 1806.

== Bibliography ==
- An essay on design in gardening, 1795
- A supplement to Johnson's English dictionary, 1803
- The life of Richard Earl Howe, 1803
- Poems by Thomas Hoccleve, never before printed, 1796
