= Oliver Popplewell =

British judge and cricketer (1927–2024)

Sir Oliver Bury Popplewell (15 August 1927 – 6 June 2024) was a British judge and cricketer. He chaired the inquiry into the Bradford City stadium fire, presided over the libel case brought by Jonathan Aitken MP against The Guardian newspaper which eventually led to Aitken's imprisonment for perjury, and was widely reported for asking "What is Linford's lunchbox?" during a case over which he was presiding, brought by Linford Christie. He played first-class cricket for Cambridge University and was president of the Marylebone Cricket Club (MCC) from 1994 to 1996. He wrote a memoir of his legal career, published in 2003.

== Personal life ==
Popplewell's father was a civil servant. He was the father of four sons, the eldest of whom is the former Cambridge University and Somerset cricketer and now solicitor, Nigel Popplewell, and another of whom, Sir Andrew Popplewell, is now a Lord Justice of Appeal.

A widower, Sir Oliver married Dame Elizabeth Gloster in March 2008. He was the godfather of Sir Stephen Fry, and the grandfather of Anna Popplewell and Lulu Popplewell.

Popplewell died on 6 June 2024, at the age of 96.

== Education ==
Popplewell went to Charterhouse School as a scholar, where he played cricket with Peter May and future politician Jim Prior, and after spending two years of National Service in the Royal Navy, he went to Queens' College, Cambridge, as an exhibitioner. He was awarded a BA degree in 1950 and an LL.B. in 1951.

In 2003, Popplewell became one of the oldest mature students at the University of Oxford when he started reading Philosophy, Politics and Economics (PPE) at Harris Manchester College.

== Cricket ==
Oliver Popplewell
Cricket information
- Batting: Right-handed

Career statistics
Competition	First-class
Matches	41
Runs scored	881
Batting average	20.48
100s/50s	0/2
Top score	74*
Balls bowled	3
Wickets	0
Bowling average	–
5 wickets in innings	–
10 wickets in match	–
Best bowling	–
Catches/stumpings	63/16
- Source: CricInfo, 12 April 2023

Popplewell was a right-handed wicket-keeper-batsman, playing 56 innings in 41 matches, scoring 881 runs for a average of 20.46 including two half-centuries.

He played for Cambridge University from 1949 to 1951 at the time when the Rev David Sheppard was playing for the university, for the MCC in 1953 and for the Free Foresters from 1952 to 1960.

His sole bowling stint was three balls for the MCC against Cambridge University in 1953. He was president of the MCC from 1994 to 1996.

== Legal career ==
Popplewell was called to the bar in 1951. He was appointed Queen's Counsel in 1969. After serving as Recorder of Burton upon Trent and Deputy Chairman of Oxfordshire Quarter Sessions, he was appointed as Recorder of the Crown Court in 1971. He was a High Court judge from 1983 until 2003. During this time, he chaired the Bradford Inquiry into Crowd Control and Safety at Sports Grounds in 1985. He was a judge of the Employment Appeal Tribunal, vice-chairman of the Parole Board, and a fellow of the Chartered Institute of Arbitrators.

=== Cases ===
In 1975 Popplewell defended his godson Stephen Fry, who was 18 at the time, at his trial for credit card fraud. Popplewell and his wife had long been friends of Fry's parents. Stephen Fry writes about the event in his autobiography Moab Is My Washpot (1997).

Following the fire at Valley Parade, the Bradford City stadium, on 11 May 1985, Popplewell was chosen to chair an inquiry held under the Safety of Sports Grounds Act 1975. Following this inquiry, he was chosen to chair a Committee of Inquiry into Crowd Safety at Sports Grounds. In 1999, he donated the papers of the inquiry to the University of Bradford. A copy of the Committee of Inquiry into Crowd Safety and Control at Sports Grounds' Interim Report is published online in PDF format by the Bradford City Fire website.

He presided over the libel case brought by Jonathan Aitken against The Guardian and Granada Television, and upheld the defence of Reynolds privilege, established in the House of Lords in Reynolds v Times Newspapers Ltd in 1999, in an action against the Yorkshire Post for reporting that a local karate company was selling "rip-off" lessons. He ruled in 2018 that the foreign act of state doctrine (a rule concerned with the courts' approach to another state's legislative and executive actions) applies not just in litigation in the English courts, but also during arbitration.

While presiding over the High Court case brought by the athlete Linford Christie against former criminal John McVicar, the editor of Spike Magazine, he was widely reported as asking, "What is Linford's lunchbox?". He later claimed that this was intended as a joke. The question was in the tradition of British jurisprudence, in which the judge asks seemingly inane questions relevant to the facts of the case on the assumption that the jury, which cannot ask questions, is ignorant of them. Following this case, the name "Mr Justice Cocklecarrot" was revived by Private Eye magazine (it was originally the name of a character in the Beachcomber column in the Daily Express) which became the magazine's generic name for unworldly and out-of-touch judges, though Popplewell asserts that this description did not apply to him.

After his retirement, Popplewell spoke up for the right of judges to impose the sentences they see fit. He had an argument with Home Secretary David Blunkett who was seeking to introduce mandatory minimum sentences for some serious crimes.

== Hillsborough controversy and the Bradford City stadium fire developments ==
On 19 October 2011, Popplewell sparked fury by calling on the Liverpool families involved in the Hillsborough disaster to behave more like the relatives of victims of the Bradford City stadium disaster. He made the comments in a letter to The Times following the Commons debate on 17 October 2011 calling for all Cabinet papers on Hillsborough to be released. He said: "The citizens of Bradford behaved with quiet dignity and great courage. They did not harbour conspiracy theories. They did not seek endless further inquiries".

His letter was published by The Times's sister paper, The Sun, which is boycotted on Merseyside, the day after it was revealed to Parliament that senior policemen had changed the evidence of junior policemen whose evidence contradicted the official version given to the press by police spokesmen. Popplewell was widely criticised for his comments, including a rebuke from a survivor of the Bradford stadium disaster.

In April 2015, Popplewell expressed the view that it was "bizarre" to suggest that the Bradford City stadium fire was anything other than accidental. This was in response to the publication of an article in The Guardian newspaper of an extract from a newly published book Fifty-Six: The Story of the Bradford Fire by Martin Fletcher. The extract of the Fletcher book contained previously unpublicised information about eight earlier fires allegedly connected to the Bradford City owner and chairman, Stafford Heginbotham (who died in 1995).

Popplewell later qualified his remark and suggested that the police should look into the "remarkable number" of fires allegedly connected to Bradford City's then chairman "to see if there was anything sinister". He had earlier said that he remained convinced that the fire was "undoubtedly" started by accident by a discarded match or cigarette, despite the new evidence.

== Works ==
- Benchmark: Life, laughter and the law. Foreword by Stephen Fry. London: I.B. Tauris. 2003. ISBN 978-1-86064-886-1.
- Football in Its Place: An Environmental Psychology of Football Grounds by David Canter, Miriam Comber and David L. Uzzell with an introduction by Sir Oliver Popplewell, Publisher: Taylor & Francis (1989); ISBN 978-0-415-01240-9
- Final report of the Committee of Inquiry into Crowd Safety and Control at Sports Grounds, London: HMSO, 1986, ISBN 9780101971003, Presented to Parliament by the Secretary of State for the Home Department and the Secretary of State for Scotland by command of Her Majesty January 1986. ([Archived PDF copy sourced – via Hatful of History website by historian Evan Smith])
  - Interim report of the Committee of Inquiry into Crowd Safety and Control at Sports Grounds, London: HMSO, 1985, ISBN 9780101958509
