= Nigel Popplewell =

English cricketer and solicitor

Personal information
- Full name: Nigel Francis Mark Popplewell
- Born: 8 August 1957 (age 69); Chislehurst, Kent, England
- Batting: Right-handed
- Bowling: Right-arm medium
- Role: All-rounder

Domestic team information
- Years: Team
- 1977–1979: Cambridge University
- 1979–1985: Somerset
- First-class debut: 23 April 1977 Cambridge University v Leicestershire
- Last First-class: 3 August 1985 Somerset v Hampshire
- List A debut: 7 May 1977 Combined Universities v Kent
- Last List A: 1 September 1985 Somerset v Sussex

Career statistics
| Competition | FC | LA |
|---|---|---|
| Matches | 143 | 123 |
| Runs scored | 5070 | 2077 |
| Batting average | 27.11 | 23.33 |
| 100s/50s | 4/22 | 0/8 |
| Top score | 172 | 84 |
| Balls bowled | 8290 | 2158 |
| Wickets | 103 | 49 |
| Bowling average | 43.11 | 32.63 |
| 5 wickets in innings | 1 | 0 |
| 10 wickets in match | 0 | n/a |
| Best bowling | 5/33 | 3/34 |
| Catches/stumpings | 110/– | 42/2 |
- Source: Cricinfo, 13 February 2010

Nigel Francis Mark Popplewell (born 8 August 1957) is an English solicitor and former first-class cricketer who made more than 200 appearances for Somerset between 1979 and 1985. A right-handed batsman and right-arm medium-pace bowler, Popplewell also occasionally played as wicket-keeper.

== Early career ==
Popplewell's father, Oliver Popplewell, was a barrister and High Court judge. His brother, Andrew Popplewell, is also a High Court judge.

Nigel Popplewell was educated at Radley College, where he captained the First XI in 1975, scoring 720 runs at an average of 45.00 and taking 60 wickets at 10.13. He went up to Selwyn College, Cambridge, and played in the Cambridge University team from 1977 to 1979. He began playing for Hampshire Second XI in 1976.

In 1976–77, aged 19 and before he had played first-class cricket, he took part in the first cricket tour of Bangladesh with Marylebone Cricket Club. In 1978 he played two matches for Northamptonshire Second XI, and in 1979 he joined Somerset.

== Career with Somerset ==
In July 1979, a few weeks after playing his last match for Cambridge, Popplewell made his Somerset debut against the touring Indian team, scoring 37 and 32 at number eight to help Somerset avoid defeat. He was a regular member of the Somerset team from 1980 to 1985, scoring over 1000 first-class runs in a season in 1984 and 1985.

He was a member of Somerset's title-winning List A teams of the period: the 1979 John Player League; the 1981 Benson & Hedges Cup, after he had won the Man of the match award in the semi-final; the 1982 Benson & Hedges Cup; and the 1983 NatWest Bank Trophy, when he made a valuable 35 at number six after going to the wicket with the score at 95 for 4.

In August 1985, after scoring 1064 runs at an average of 38.00 in 18 first-class matches, and a few weeks after making his highest score, 172 against Essex in an opening partnership of 243 with Peter Roebuck, Popplewell retired from cricket to resume his legal studies.

== Career after cricket ==
Popplewell taught school science during the winter recesses from cricket during his cricket years. He re-qualified as a solicitor in 1987, practising in Taunton, where he specialised first in litigation, then company law and subsequently tax. He was joint head of Burges Salmon's corporate tax team, and chairman of the Law Society's Stamp Taxes Working Group. He is now a senior tax consultant with PKF Francis Clark. Since 2015 he has sat as a fee paid judge in the First-Tier Tribunal (Tax Chamber).
