= Andrew Popplewell =

British judge

The Right Honourable Lord Justice Popplewell
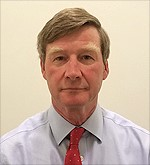

Lord Justice of Appeal
- Incumbent
- Assumed office 21 October 2019
- Monarchs: Elizabeth II; Charles III

High Court Judge, Queen's Bench Division
- In office 3 October 2011 – 21 October 2019

Personal details
- Born: 14 January 1959 (age 67)
- Children: 3, including Anna and Lulu
- Parent: Oliver Popplewell (father)
- Education: Downing College, Cambridge
- Occupation: Lawyer, judge

Sir Andrew John Popplewell PC (born 14 January 1959), styled The Rt Hon Lord Justice Popplewell, is a Lord Justice of Appeal (a judge of the Court of Appeal in England and Wales), having previously served as a High Court judge.

Son of Sir Oliver Popplewell, he was educated at Radley College and Downing College, Cambridge. He has three children: Anna Popplewell, actress star of the Chronicles of Narnia series, Lulu Popplewell, who played Daisy in Love Actually, and Freddie Popplewell, a barrister.

He was called to the bar at Inner Temple in 1981. He was made a QC in 1997 and was a recorder from 2002 to 2011. He was appointed a judge of the High Court of Justice (Queen's Bench Division) and knighted in 2011.

On 21 October 2019, he was appointed to the Court of Appeal as a Lord Justice of Appeal.
